= Business association =

Business association may refer to:

- Company law, or the law of business associations, is often used for United States corporate law.
- Trade association
- Chamber of Commerce
