= Zapata Corp v. Maldonado =

- Court: Delaware Supreme Court
- Citation: 430 A 2d 779 (Del Sup 1979)

Keywords
- Derivative action

Zapata Corp v. Maldonado 430 A 2d 779 (Del Sup 1979) is a US corporate law case, concerning the derivative suits in Delaware.

== Facts ==
There was suspicion about whether a special litigation committee appointed by the board, which then dismissed the validity of a claim, was independent. The Zapata Corp was founded by George H. W. Bush.

== Judgment ==
The Delaware Supreme Court held that a "special litigation committee" would not automatically be regarded as independent. However in this case the board could not be sued for breach of fiduciary duty, and on the facts the committee was competent to reject the demand for a derivative suit, despite being appointed by the board.

Where a derivative suit cannot be brought without prior demand upon the directors followed by refusal, the directors' decision will stand absent a demonstration of self-interest or bad faith; but where such a demand is excused (for reasons of futility, etc.) and a derivative action is properly brought, an independent committee of directors may obtain a dismissal only if the trial court finds both (a) that the committee was independent, acted in good faith and made a reasonable investigation; and (b) that in the court's independent business judgment as to the corporation's best interest, the action should be dismissed.

== Reactions ==
Senator Joseph Biden was assumed to have reacted positively to the news, due to his past support for financial regulations bills.

== See also ==
- United States corporate law
