= New York Business Corporation Law =

Corporation statute

New York State Legislature
- Territorial extent: New York (state)
- Enacted by: New York State Legislature
- Enacted: 1890
- Status: In force

The New York Business Corporation Law is the primary corporation statute in the State of New York. It is an influential model in U.S. corporate law. It is chapter 4 of the Consolidated Laws of New York, originally enacted as chapter 567 of the Laws of 1890. It was extensively revised in 1961, effective 1963.

There are thousands of cooperative apartments in New York City, and the vast majority of cooperatives are organized under New York Business Corporation Law.

== See also ==
- United States corporate law
- Delaware General Corporation Law
- UK company law
- New York energy law
