= In re Oracle Corp. Derivative Litigation =

US corporate law case

- Court: Delaware Court of Chancery
- Decided: June 17, 2003
- Citation: 824 A.2d 917

Court membership
- Judge sitting: Leo E. Strine Jr.

Keywords
- Derivative action

In re Oracle Corp. Derivative Litigation, 824 A.2d 917 (Del. Ch. 2003) is a US corporate law case, concerning the derivative suits in Delaware.

== Facts ==
A group of shareholders in the Oracle Corporation sought to bring a derivative suit on allegations of insider trading against the corporation's directors, mainly the CEO Larry Ellison, Donald Lucas, and Michael Boskin. The shareholders made a demand on the board to litigate, and this was rejected by the Special Litigation Committee (SLC). Hector Garcia-Molina and Joseph Grundfest, both Stanford professors and members of the board, were appointed to the SLC. These professor had extensive relationships with the directors. Therefore, the shareholders claimed the board was conflicted and asked the court for permission to bring the claim on the basis of the director's personal ties.

Ellison, at the time, was very wealthy and was publicly considering extremely large contributions to Stanford when Molina and Grundfest were added to the board. He also headed a medical research foundation that was a source of nearly $10 million in funding to Stanford. Ellison's child had recently been rejected for admission but that did not deter Ellison from considering the donations.

== Judgment ==
Vice Chancellor Leo E. Strine Jr. wrote the opinion of the court. The Delaware Court held that the derivative claim, based on insider trading, against Oracle Corp CEO Larry Ellison could proceed. The director had personal ties, and so a decision by the board to reject the claim could not be conclusive.

The decision set a high required standard for SLC independence.

The question of independence, "turns on whether a director is, for any substantial reason, incapable of making a decision with only the best interests of the corporation in mind."3 That is, the independence test ultimately "focus[es] on impartiality and objectivity."4 In this case, the SLC has failed to demonstrate that no material factual question exists regarding its independence.

Although Molina and Grundfest claimed ignorance about the CEO's connections with Stanford, an inquiry into the CEO's connections with the university should have been conducted before the SLC was finally formed and, at the very least, should have been undertaken in connection with its report.

I conclude that the SLC has not met its burden to show the absence of a material factual question about its independence. I find this to be the case because the ties among the SLC, the Trading Defendants, and Stanford are so substantial that they cause reasonable doubt about the SLC's ability to impartially consider whether the Trading Defendants should face suit.

== Significance ==
The case was subsequently settled. Ellison agreed to pay $100 million to charity to resolve the lawsuit. This provision allowed for one of the largest payments made to resolve a derivative shareholder suit and the first to settlement payment to go solely to charity. Some criticize the settlement as being too easy on Ellison and not providing damages to Oracle and its shareholders.

== See also ==
- United States corporate law
