= Broz v. Cellular Information Systems Inc. =

Broz v Cellular Information Systems Inc
- Court: Delaware Supreme Court
- Full case name: Robert F. Broz and RFB Cellular, Inc. v. Cellular Information Systems Inc.
- Decided: March 22, 1996
- Citation: 673 A.2d 148

Court membership
- Judges sitting: E. Norman Veasey, Joseph T. Walsh, Randy J. Holland

Case opinions
- Decision by: Veasey

Keywords
- Directors' duties

Broz v. Cellular Information Systems Inc., 637 A.2d 148 (Del. 1996), is a US corporate law case, concerning the standard in Delaware corporations regarding conflicts of interest. It exemplifies that the Delaware courts spend considerable resources inquiring into whether a director has had an actual conflict of interest, as opposed to the traditional common law approach which demanded that there should be no possibility of a conflict.

== Facts ==
Broz was sole shareholder and president of RFB Cellular Inc. (RFB), which held telecommunications licenses for a number of districts in Michigan.

Broz was also a non-executive board member of CIS, which operated in the same business in the upper Midwestern United States; notably it too operated in parts of Michigan.

Broz, as owner of RFB, was approached by Mackinac, a tele-license broker, who offered him another opportunity for a license in Michigan. Broz discussed the matter informally with the CIS board, but did not tell them that he had started negotiating for the license; Broz believed that CIS would not be interested in the opportunity, because at the time it was shedding licenses to try and stave off bankruptcy.

Broz was successful in obtaining the license for RFB. Shortly thereafter, CIS avoided bankruptcy and closure by being acquired by Pri-Cellular, after which CIS sued Broz for breaching his fiduciary duty of loyalty, diverting the opportunity to himself.

Both Pri-Cellular and RFB were later absorbed by Dobson Cellular in 1998 and 2004, respectively; Dobson was itself bought out by AT&T in 2007.)

== Judgment ==
The Delaware Supreme Court held that Broz was not under any obligation to offer the Michigan-2 licence to the CIS board, the opportunity being one that had come to him personally. The plaintiff company had lacked both the interest and the financial means to acquire the licence for itself.

First, we find that CIS was not financially capable of exploiting the Michigan-2 opportunity. Although the Court of Chancery concluded otherwise, we hold that this finding was not supported by the evidence.

[...]

The Court in Guth also derived a corollary which states that a director or officer may take a corporate opportunity if: (1) the opportunity is presented to the director or officer in his individual and not his corporate capacity; (2) the opportunity is not essential to the corporation; (3) the corporation holds no interest or expectancy in the opportunity; and (4) the director or officer has not wrongfully employed the resources of the corporation in pursuing or exploiting the opportunity.

[...]

No one factor is dispositive and all the facts must be taken into account insofar as they are applicable.

== See also ==
- United States corporate law
