= Joy v. North =

1982 US corporate law case

- Court: United States Court of Appeals for the Second Circuit
- Decided: November 4, 1982
- Citation: 692 F.2d 880 (2d Cir. 1982)

Court membership
- Judges sitting: Ralph K. Winter Jr., James L. Oakes, Richard J. Cardamone

Keywords
- Directors' duties, derivative suit

Joy v. North, 692 F.2d 880 (2d Cir. 1982) is a US corporate law case, concerning the rules for bringing a corporate derivative suit. The case arose under Connecticut law, but the opinion extensively discussed by analogy the relevant standards under Delaware and New York law.

== Facts ==
Doris Joy was a minority shareholder in Citytrust, Inc and Nelson North was the CEO. Doris complained that Nelson had given a loan to Katz Corp, without considering the merits of the deal, because Katz Corp employed Nelson's son. Citytrust, Inc established a 'Special Litigation Committee' of two independent directors, which concluded that the litigation should be discontinued in respect of most of the board members.

== Judgment ==
Judge Winter held that the litigation was warranted. If the case appears to be worth a substantial amount in relation to equity, the case should continue. If not it must consider further business factors.

The relevant decision - whether to continue litigation - is at hand and the danger of deceptive hindsight simply does not exist. Moreover, it can hardly be argued that terminating a lawsuit is an area in which courts have no special aptitude... what we say here applies to cases involving allegations of direct economic injury to the corporation diminishing the value of the shareholders' investment as a consequence of fraud, mismanagement or self dealing.

...

In cases such as the present one, the burden is on the moving party, as in motions for summary judgment generally, to demonstrate that the action is more likely than not to be against the interests of the corporation. This showing is to be based on the underlying data developed in the course of discovery and of the committee's investigation and the committee's reasoning, not simply its naked conclusions. The weight to be given certain evidence is to be determined by conventional analysis, such as whether testimony is under oath and subject to cross-examination. Finally, the function of the court's review is to determine the balance of probabilities as to likely future benefit to the corporation, not to render a decision on the merits, fashion the appropriate legal principles or resolve issues of credibility. Where the legal rule is unclear and the likely evidence in conflict, the court need only weigh the uncertainties, not resolve them. The court's function is thus not unlike a lawyer's determining what a case is "worth" for purposes of settlement.

Where the court determines that the likely recoverable damages discounted by the probability of a finding of liability are less than the costs to the corporation in continuing the action, it should dismiss the case. The costs which may properly be taken into account are attorney's fees and other out-of-pocket expenses related to the litigation and time spent by corporate personnel preparing for and participating in the trial. The court should also weigh indemnification which is mandatory under corporate by-laws, private contract or Connecticut law, discounted of course by the probability of liability for such sums. We believe indemnification the corporation may later pay as a matter of discretion should not be taken into account since it is an avoidable cost. The existence or non-existence of insurance should not be considered in the calculation of costs, since premiums have previously been paid. The existence of insurance is relevant to the calculation of potential benefits.

Where, having completed the above analysis, the court finds a likely net return to the corporation which is not substantial in relation to shareholder equity, it may take into account two other items as costs. First, it may consider the impact of distraction of key personnel by continued litigation. Second, it may take into account potential lost profits which may result from the publicity of a trial.

Judicial scrutiny of special litigation committee recommendations should thus be limited to a comparison of the direct costs imposed upon the corporation by the litigation with the potential benefits. We are mindful that other less direct costs may be incurred, such as a negative impact on morale and upon the corporate image. Nevertheless, we believe that such factors, with the two exceptions noted, should not be taken into account. Quite apart from the elusiveness of attempting to predict such effects, they are quite likely to be directly related to the degree of wrongdoing, a spectacular fraud being generally more newsworthy and damaging to morale than a mistake in judgment as to the strength of consumer demand.

We do recognize two exceptions, however. First, where the likely net return is not substantial in relation to shareholder equity, the court can consider the degree to which key personnel may be distracted from corporate business by continuance of the litigation. We appreciate that litigation can disrupt the decision-making process and thereby impose unforeseen and undetected costs. These are not measurable and we limit consideration of them to cases where the likely return to the corporation is not great. Where that is the case and many of the key directors and officers will be heavily involved in the litigation, a court may take such potential costs into account.

Second, where the corporation deals with the general public and its level of business is dependent upon public identification and acceptance of the corporate product or service, we believe the court ought to take potential business lost as a consequence of a trial into account when the likely net return to the corporation is not substantial in relation to total shareholder equity. In such a case, there is less likelihood of a direct relationship between impact on business and degree of misconduct. Where the likely return to the corporation from the litigation is higher, however, we believe the uncertainty as to the kind of publicity which will attend a trial precludes consideration of that impact. Moreover, when potential lost profits are taken into account, the basis for calculating them must be something more solid than the conclusory opinions of alleged experts, e.g., verifiable examples in similar firms.

Judge Cardamone, dissenting, disapproved of the method. He said future attorney fees and litigation expenses, corporate goodwill and corporate morale cannot be determined.

This calculus is so complicated, indefinite and subject to judicial caprice as to be unworkable... This veritable Pandora's box of unanswered questions raises more problems than it solves. Even more fundamentally unsound is the majority's underlying premise that judges are equipped to make business judgments… Reasons of practicality and good sense strongly suggest that business decisions be left to businessmen.

[...]

In a land weary of overregulation and the kind of judicial activism embodied in the second step of Maldonado, there may well be a strong inclination for business to incorporate in states more hospitable to them. See, e.g., Genzer v. Cunningham, 498 F.Supp. 682, 688 (E.D.Mich.1980)'

[...]

The Business Round Table, a group of over one hundred chief executive officers of America's largest corporations has publicly stated that a view like the one adopted by the majority will lead to more derivative lawsuits being brought, make it more difficult for corporations to have them dismissed, discourage risk-taking and make fewer candidates willing to serve on boards of directors.

== See also ==
- United States corporate law
