= Shlensky v. Wrigley =

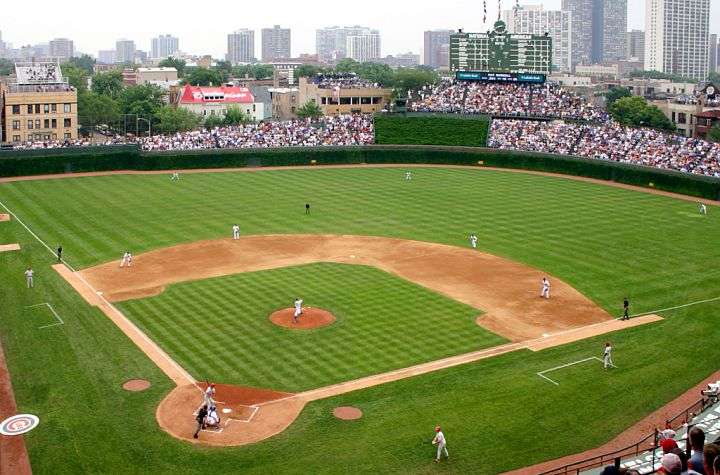
- Wrigley Field
- Citation: 237 N.E. 2d 776 (Ill. App. 1968)

Keywords
- Directors' duties

Shlensky v Wrigley, 237 NE 2d 776 (Ill. App. 1968) is a leading US corporate law case concerning the board's discretion to determine how to balance stakeholders' interests. The case embraces the application of the business judgment rule to directors' good-faith judgments about long-term shareholder value. Some believe it represents the shift in most states away from the idea that corporations should only pursue shareholder value, as seen in the older Michigan decision of Dodge v. Ford Motor Co..

== Facts ==
The Chicago Cubs' president, Philip K. Wrigley, refused to install field lights for night games at Wrigley Field. "Plaintiff allege[d] that Wrigley ha[d] refused to install lights, not because of interest in the welfare of the corporation but because of his personal opinions 'that baseball is a 'daytime sport' and that installation of lights and night baseball games will have a deteriorating effect upon the surrounding neighborhood'." This meant that night games could not go ahead, and so, in the view of Shlensky, would result in lower profits for shareholders. Shareholder Shlensky brought a challenge against the directors' decision.

Importantly, the question on appeal was if Shlensky was entitled to bring a case against Wrigley at all; since this is a shareholder derivative suit, the person claiming shareholder harm (here, Shlensky) normally has to prove that the directors of a corporation committed fraud, illegal acts, or had a conflict of interest. This affected the Court's analysis of the facts, as they were deciding on the type of legal claim and not explicitly deciding whether Wrigley's actions were good or bad.

== Judgment ==
The Court affirmed the director's decision. The president was not liable for failing to maximize returns to shareholders. It was,

not satisfied that the motives assigned to [the directors] are contrary to the best interests of the corporation and the stockholders… [because they] showed no fraud, illegality or conflict of interest in making that decision.

[...]

[Citing Davis v Louisville Gas and Electric Co, 16 Del. Ch. 157 (1928)] ...the directors are chosen to pass upon such questions and their judgment unless shown to be tainted with fraud is accepted as final. The judgment the directors of the corporation enjoys the benefit of a presumption that it was formed in good faith, and [it] was designed to promote the best interests of the corporation they serve.

== See also ==
- United States corporate law
