= United States corporate law =

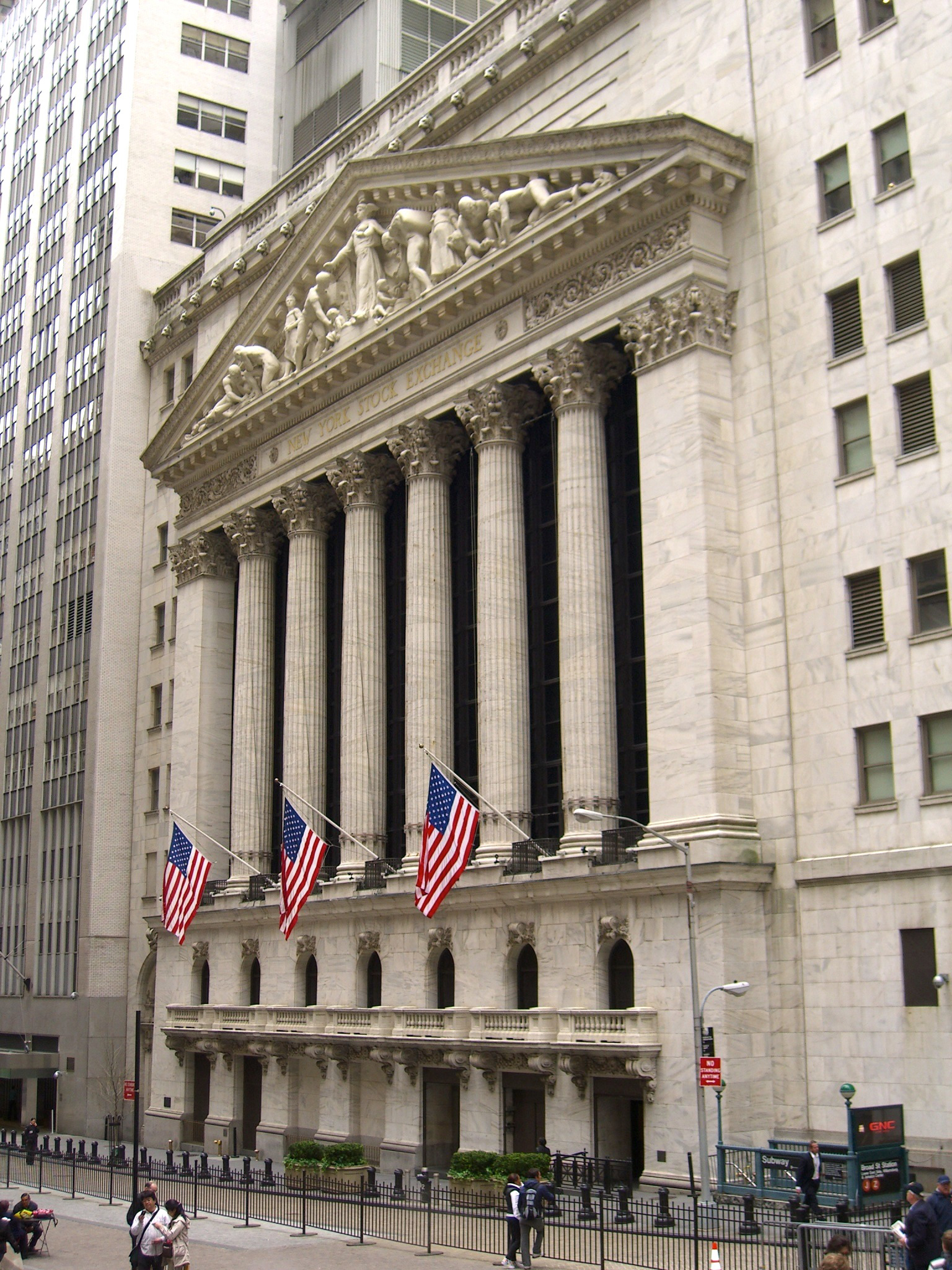
The New York Stock Exchange (headquarters pictured) is the major center for listing and trading shares in United States. Most corporations are, however, incorporated under the influential Delaware General Corporation Law.

United States corporate law regulates the governance, finance and power of corporations in US law.

Every state and territory has its own basic corporate code, while federal law creates minimum standards for trade in company shares and governance rights, found mostly in the Securities Act of 1933 and the Securities and Exchange Act of 1934, as amended by laws like the Sarbanes–Oxley Act of 2002 and the Dodd–Frank Wall Street Reform and Consumer Protection Act. The US Constitution was interpreted by the US Supreme Court to allow corporations to incorporate in the state of their choice, regardless of where their headquarters are.

Over the 20th century, most major corporations incorporated under the Delaware General Corporation Law, which offered lower corporate taxes, fewer shareholder rights against directors, and developed a specialized court and legal profession. Nevada has attempted to do the same. Twenty-four states follow the Model Business Corporation Act, while New York and California are important due to their size.

== History ==
At the Declaration of Independence, corporations had been unlawful without explicit authorization in a royal charter or an Act of Parliament of the United Kingdom. Since the world's first stock market crash (the South Sea Bubble of 1720) corporations were perceived as dangerous. This was because, as the economist Adam Smith wrote in The Wealth of Nations (1776), directors managed "other people's money" and this conflict of interest meant directors were prone to "negligence and profusion". Corporations were only thought to be legitimate in specific industries (such as insurance or banking) that could not be managed efficiently through partnerships.

After the US Constitution was ratified in 1788, corporations were still distrusted, and were tied into debate about interstate exercise of sovereign power. The First Bank of the United States was chartered in 1791 by the US Congress to raise money for the government and create a common currency (alongside a federal excise tax and the US Mint). It had private investors (not government owned), but faced opposition from southern politicians who feared federal power overtaking state power. So, the First Bank's charter was written to expire in 20 years. State governments could and did also incorporate corporations through special legislation.

In 1811, New York became the first state to have a simple public registration procedure to start corporations (not specific permission from the legislature) for manufacturing business. It also allowed investors to have limited liability, so that if the enterprise went bankrupt investors would lose their investment, but not any extra debts that had been run up to creditors. An early Supreme Court case, Dartmouth College v. Woodward (1819), went so far as to say that once a corporation was established a state legislature (in this case, New Hampshire) could not amend it. States quickly reacted by reserving the right to regulate future dealings by corporations. Generally speaking, corporations were treated as "legal persons" with separate legal personality from its shareholders, directors or employees. Corporations were the subject of legal rights and duties: they could make contracts, hold property or commission torts, but there was no necessary requirement to treat a corporation as favorably as a real person.

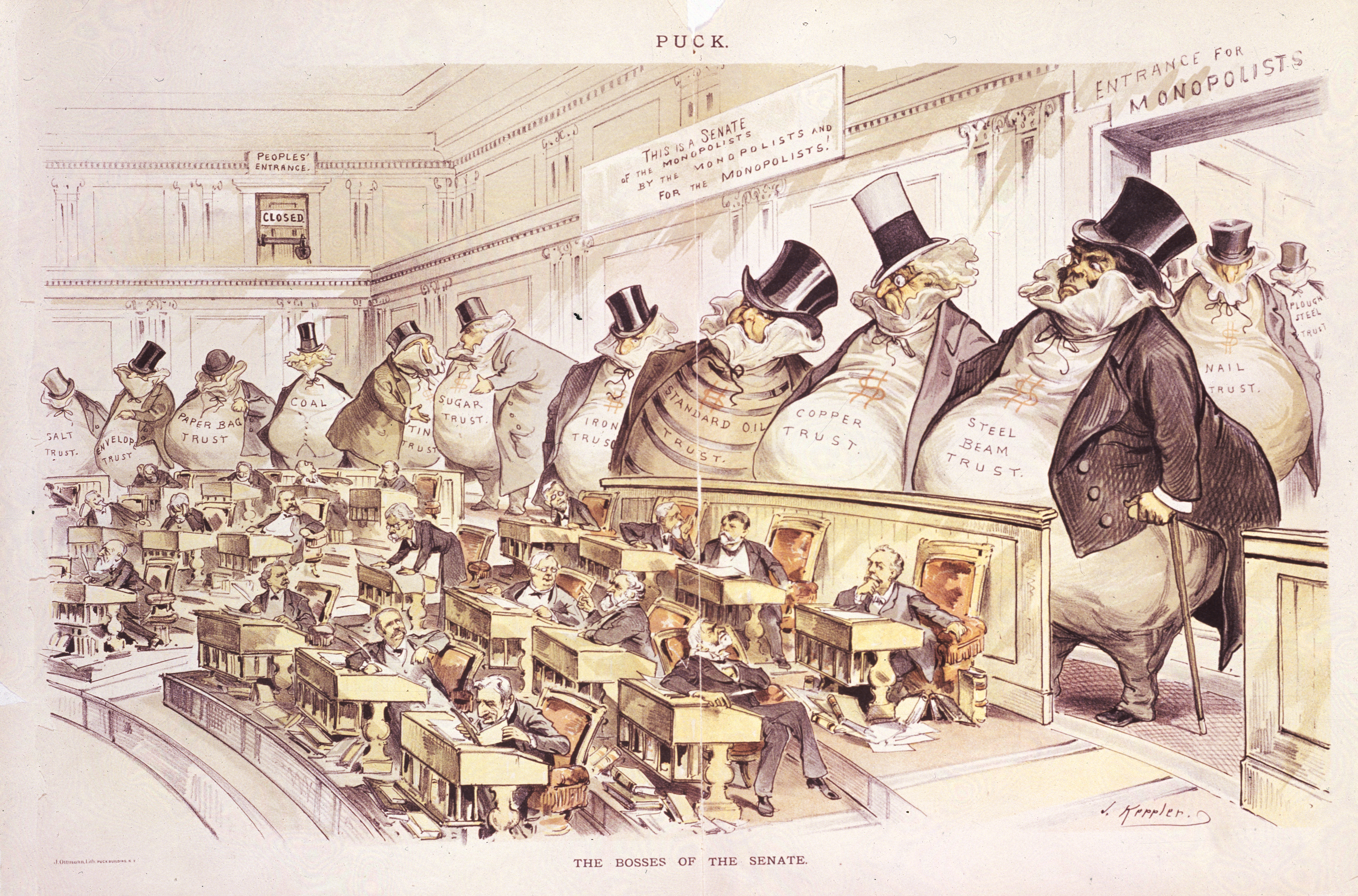
"The Bosses of the Senate", corporate interests–from steel, copper, oil, iron, sugar, tin, and coal to paper bags, envelopes, and salt–as giant money bags looming over senators

Over the late 19th century, more and more states allowed free incorporation of businesses with a simple registration procedure; Delaware enacted its General Corporation Law in 1899. Many corporations would be small and democratically organized, with one-person, one-vote, no matter what amount the investor had, and directors would be frequently up for election. However, the dominant trend led towards immense corporate groups where the standard rule was one-share, one-vote.

At the end of the 19th century, "trust" systems (where formal ownership had to be used for another person's benefit) were used to concentrate control into the hands of a few people, or a single person. In response, the Sherman Antitrust Act of 1890 was created to break up big business conglomerates, and the Clayton Act of 1914 gave the government power to halt mergers and acquisitions that could damage the public interest. By the end of the First World War, it was increasingly perceived that ordinary people had little voice compared to the "financial oligarchy" of bankers and industrial magnates. In particular, employees lacked voice compared to shareholders, but plans for a post-war "industrial democracy" (giving employees votes for investing their labor) did not become widespread.

Through the 1920s, power concentrated in fewer hands as corporations issued shares with multiple voting rights, while other shares were sold with no votes at all. This practice was halted in 1926 by public pressure and the New York Stock Exchange refusing to list non-voting shares. It was possible to sell voteless shares in the economic boom of the 1920s, because more and more ordinary people were looking to the stock market to save the new money they were earning, but the law did not guarantee good information or fair terms. New shareholders had no power to bargain against large corporate issuers, but still needed a place to save. Before the Wall Street crash of 1929, people were being sold shares in corporations with fake businesses, as accounts and business reports were not made available to the investing public.

over the enterprise and over the physical property – the instruments of production – in which he has an interest, the owner has little control. At the same time he bears no responsibility with respect to the enterprise or its physical property. It has often been said that the owner of a horse is responsible. If the horse lives he must feed it. If the horse dies he must bury it. No such responsibility attaches to a share of stock. The owner is practically powerless through his own efforts to affect the underlying property ... Physical property capable of being shaped by its owner could bring to him direct satisfaction apart from the income it yielded in more concrete form. It represented an extension of his own personality. With the corporate revolution, this quality has been lost to the property owner much as it has been lost to the worker through the industrial revolution.

— AA Berle and GC Means, The Modern Corporation and Private Property (1932) Book I, ch IV, 64

The Wall Street crash saw the total collapse of stock market values, as shareholders realized that corporations had become overpriced. They sold shares en masse, meaning many companies found it hard to get finance. The result was that thousands of businesses were forced to close, and they laid off workers. Because workers had less money to spend, businesses received less income, leading to more closures and lay-offs. This downward spiral began the Great Depression. Berle and Means argued that under-regulation was the primary cause in their foundational book in 1932, The Modern Corporation and Private Property. They said directors had become too unaccountable, and the markets lacked basic transparency rules. Ultimately, shareholder interests had to be equal to or "subordinated to a number of claims by labor, by customers and patrons, by the community".

This led directly to the New Deal reforms of the Securities Act of 1933 and Securities and Exchange Act of 1934. A new Securities and Exchange Commission was empowered to require corporations disclose all material information about their business to the investing public. Because many shareholders were physically distant from corporate headquarters where meetings would take place, new rights were made to allow people to cast votes via proxies, on the view that this and other measures would make directors more accountable. Given these reforms, a major controversy still remained about the duties that corporations also owed to employees, other stakeholders, and the rest of society.

After World War II, a general consensus emerged that directors were not bound purely to pursue "shareholder value" but could exercise their discretion for the good of all stakeholders, for instance by increasing wages instead of dividends, or providing services for the good of the community instead of only pursuing profits, if it was in the interests of the enterprise as a whole. However, different states had different corporate laws. To increase revenue from corporate tax, individual states had an incentive to lower their standards in a "race to the bottom" to attract corporations to set up their headquarters in the state, particularly where directors controlled the decision to incorporate. "Charter competition", by the 1960s, had led Delaware to become home to the majority of the largest US corporations. This meant that the case law of the Delaware Chancery and Supreme Court became increasingly influential.

During the 1980s, a huge takeover and merger boom decreased directors' accountability. To fend off a takeover, courts allowed boards to institute "poison pills" or "shareholder rights plans", which allowed directors to veto any bid – and probably get a payout for letting a takeover happen. More and more people's retirement savings were being invested into the stock market, through pension funds, life insurance and mutual funds. This resulted in a vast growth in the asset management industry, which tended to take control of voting rights. Both the financial sector's share of income, and executive pay for chief executive officers began to rise far beyond real wages for the rest of the workforce. The Enron scandal of 2001 led to some reforms in the Sarbanes-Oxley Act (on separating auditors from consultancy work). The 2008 financial crisis led to minor changes in the Dodd-Frank Act (on soft regulation of pay, alongside derivative markets). However, the basic shape of corporate law in the United States has remained the same since the 1980s.

== Corporations and civil law ==
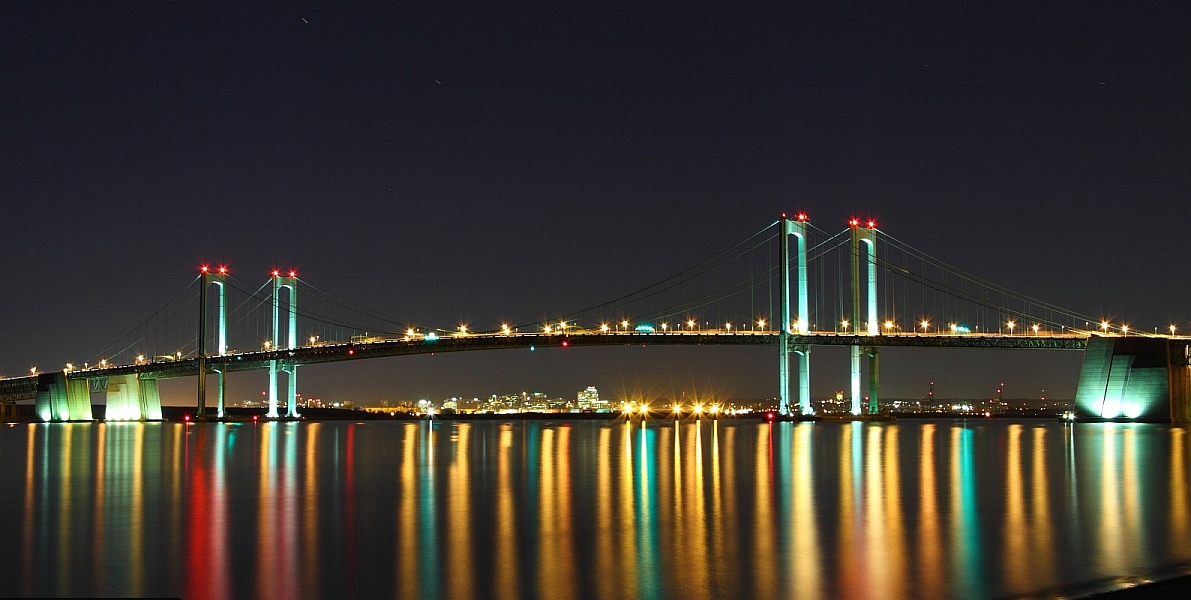
The state of Delaware is the place of incorporation for over 60 per cent of Fortune 500 corporations. In 1999, from 6,530 publicly traded nonfinancial firms in the US, 3,771 (57.75%) were incorporated in Delaware, 283 (4.33%) in California, and 226 (3.46%) in New York.

Corporations are invariably classified as "legal persons" by all modern systems of law, meaning that like natural persons, they may acquire rights and duties. A corporation may be chartered in any of the 50 states (or the District of Columbia) and may become authorized to do business in each jurisdiction it does business within, except that when a corporation sues or is sued over a contract, the court, regardless of where the corporation's headquarters office is located, or where the transaction occurred, will use the law of the jurisdiction where the corporation was chartered (unless the contract says otherwise). So, for example, consider a corporation which sets up a concert in Hawaii, where its headquarters are in Minnesota, and it is chartered in Colorado, if it is sued over its actions involving the concert, whether it was sued in Hawaii (where the concert is located), or Minnesota (where its headquarters are located), the court in that state will still use Colorado law to determine how its corporate dealings are to be performed.

All major public corporations are also characterized by holding limited liability and having a centralized management. When a group of people go through the procedures to incorporate, they will acquire rights to make contracts, to possess property, to sue, and they will also be responsible for torts, or other wrongs, and be sued. The federal government does not charter corporations (except National Banks, Federal Savings Banks, and Federal Credit Unions) although it does regulate them. Each of the 50 states plus DC has its own corporation law. Most large corporations have historically chosen to incorporate in Delaware, even though they operate nationally, and may have little or no business in Delaware itself. The extent to which corporations should have the same rights as real people is controversial, particularly when it comes to the fundamental rights found in the United States Bill of Rights. As a matter of law, a corporation acts through real people that form its board of directors, and then through the officers and employees who are appointed on its behalf. Shareholders can in some cases make decisions on the corporation's behalf, though in larger companies they tend to be passive. Otherwise, most corporations adopt limited liability so that generally shareholders cannot be sued for a corporation's commercial debts. If a corporation goes bankrupt, and is unable to pay debts to commercial creditors as they fall due, then in some circumstances state courts allow the so-called "veil of incorporation" to be pierced, and so to hold the people behind the corporation liable. This is usually rare and in almost all cases involves non-payment of trust fund taxes or willful misconduct, essentially amounting to fraud.

=== Incorporation and charter competition ===
The process of starting up a new corporation is quick, though each state differs. A corporation is not the only kind of business organization that can be chosen. People may wish to register a partnership or a Limited Liability Company, depending on the precise tax status and organizational form that is sought. Most frequently, however, people running major enterprises will choose corporations which have limited liability for those who become the shareholders: if the corporation goes bankrupt the default rule is that shareholders will only lose the money they paid for their shares, even if debts to commercial creditors are still unpaid. A state office, perhaps called the "Division of Corporations" or simply the "Secretary of State", will require the people who wish to incorporate to file "articles of incorporation" (sometimes called a "charter") and pay a fee. The articles of incorporation typically record the corporation's name, if there are any limits to its powers, purposes or duration, identify whether all shares will have the same rights. With this information filed with the state, a new corporation will come into existence, and be subject to the legal rights and duties that the people involved create on its behalf. The incorporators will also have to adopt "bylaws" which identify many more details such as the number of directors, the arrangement of the board, requirements for corporate meetings, duties of officer holders and so on. The certificate of incorporation will have identified whether the directors or the shareholders, or both have the competence to adopt and change these rules. All of this is typically achieved through the corporation's first meeting.

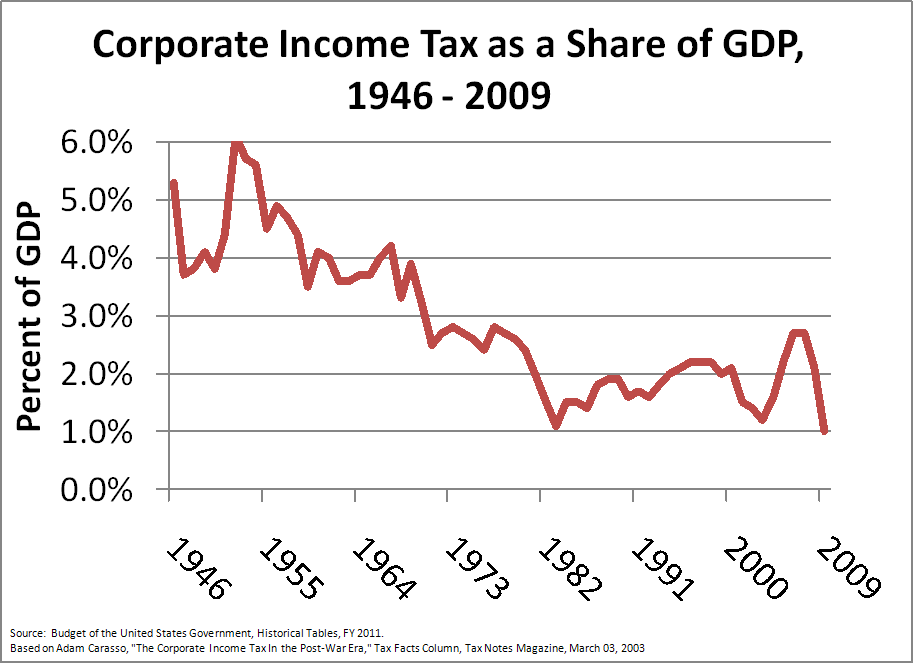
Corporate income tax as a share of GDP, 1946–2009

One of the most important things that the articles of incorporation determine is the state of incorporation. Different states can have different levels of corporate tax or franchise tax, different qualities of shareholder and stakeholder rights, more or less stringent directors' duties, and so on. However, it was held by the Supreme Court in Paul v Virginia that in principle states ought to allow corporations incorporated in a different state to do business freely. This appeared to remain true even if another state (e.g. Delaware) required significantly worse internal protections for shareholders, employees, or creditors than the state in which the corporation operated (e.g. New York). So far, federal regulation has affected more issues relating to the securities markets than the balance of power and duties among directors, shareholders, employees and other stakeholders. The Supreme Court has also acknowledged that one state's laws will govern the "internal affairs" of a corporation, to prevent conflicts among state laws. So on the present law, regardless of where a corporation operates in the 50 states, the rules of the state of incorporation (subject to federal law) will govern its operation. Early in the 20th century, it was recognized by some states, initially New Jersey, that the state could cut its tax rate in order to attract more incorporations, and thus bolster tax receipts. Quickly, Delaware emerged as a preferred state of incorporation. In the 1933 case of Louis K. Liggett Co v Lee, Brandeis J. represented the view that the resulting "race was one not of diligence, but of laxity", particularly in terms of corporate tax rates, and rules that might protect less powerful corporate stakeholders. Over the 20th century, the problem of a "race to the bottom" was increasingly thought to justify Federal regulation of corporations. The contrasting view was that regulatory competition among states could be beneficial, on the assumption that shareholders would choose to invest their money with corporations that were well governed. Thus the state's corporation regulations would be "priced" by efficient markets. In this way it was argued to be a "race to the top". An intermediate viewpoint in the academic literature, suggested that regulatory competition could in fact be either positive or negative, and could be used to the advantage of different groups, depending on which stakeholders would exercise most influence in the decision about which state to incorporate in. Under most state laws, directors hold the exclusive power to allow a vote on amending the articles of incorporation, and shareholders must approve directors' proposals by a majority, unless a higher threshold is in the articles.

=== Corporate personality ===
In principle a duly incorporated business acquires "legal personality" that is separate from the people who invest their capital, and their labor, into the corporation. Just as the common law had for municipal and church corporations for centuries, it was held by the Supreme Court in Bank of the United States v Deveaux that in principle corporations had legal capacity. At its center, corporations being "legal persons" mean they can make contracts and other obligations, hold property, sue to enforce their rights and be sued for breach of duty. Beyond the core of private law rights and duties the question has, however, continually arisen about the extent to which corporations and real people should be treated alike. The meaning of "person", when used in a statute or the US Bill of Rights is typically thought to turn on the construction of the statute, so that in different contexts the legislature or Founding Fathers could have intended different things by "person". For example, in an 1869 case named Paul v Virginia, the US Supreme Court held that the word "citizen" in the Privileges and Immunities Clause of the US Constitution (article IV, section 2) did not include corporations. This meant that the Commonwealth of Virginia was entitled to require that a New York fire insurance corporation, run by Mr Samuel Paul, acquired a license to sell policies within Virginia, even though there were different rules for corporations incorporated within the state. By contrast, in Santa Clara County v Southern Pacific Railroad Co, a majority of the Supreme Court hinted that a corporation might be regarded as a "person" under the Equal Protection Clause of the Fourteenth Amendment. The Southern Pacific Railroad Company had claimed it should not be subject to differential tax treatment, compared to natural persons, set by the State Board of Equalization acting under the Constitution of California. However, in the event Harlan J held that the company could not be assessed for tax on a technical point: the state county had included too much property in its calculations. Differential treatment between natural persons and corporations was therefore not squarely addressed.

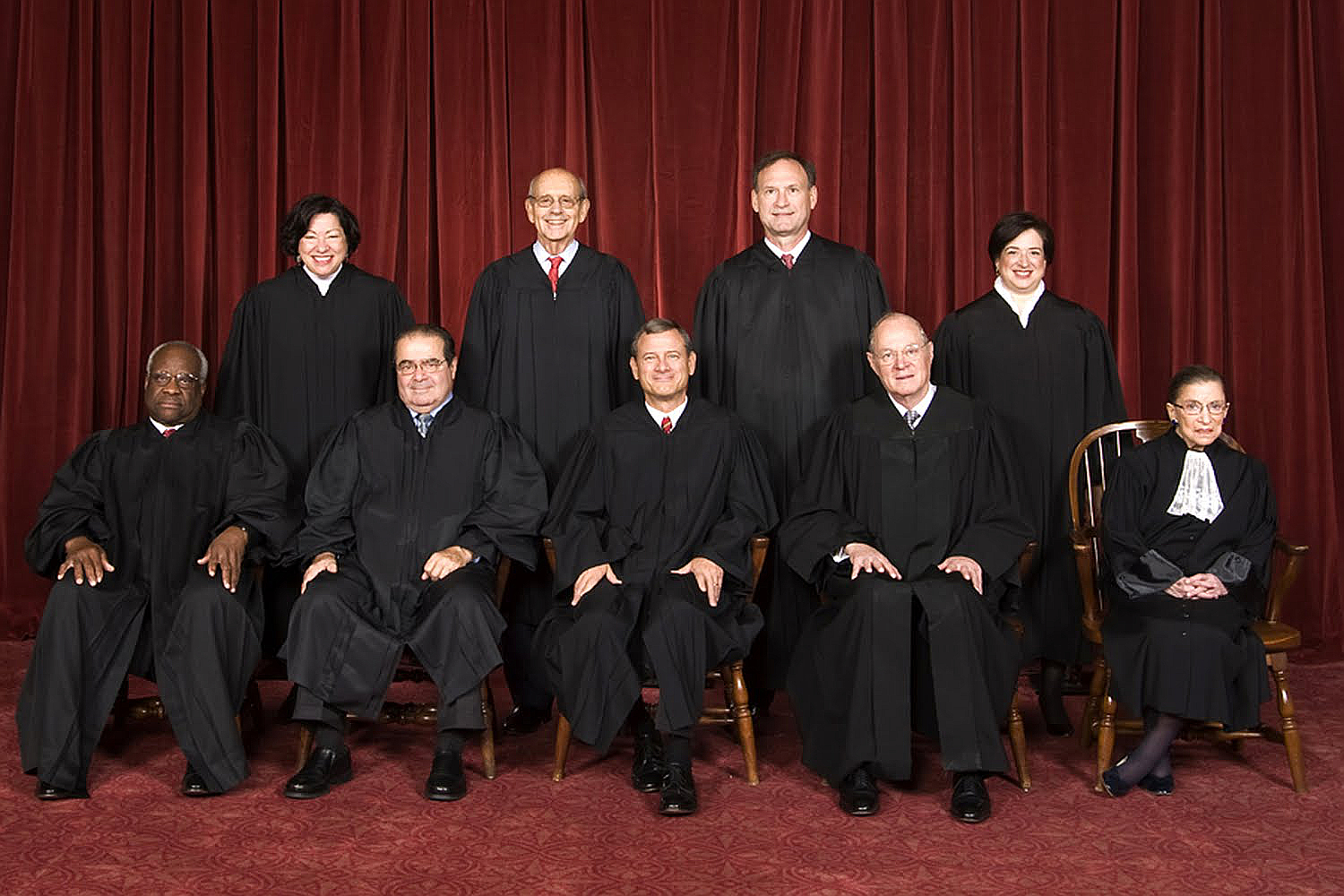
In Citizens United v FEC, the US Supreme Court in a 5 to 4 decision removed the power of state and federal legislatures to control unlimited spending by corporations on political campaigns, reasoning that corporations are "persons" under the First Amendment.

In the late 20th century, however, the issue of whether a corporation counted as a "person" for all or some purposes acquired political significance. Initially, in Buckley v Valeo a slight majority of the US Supreme Court had held that natural persons were entitled to spend unlimited amounts of their own money on their political campaigns. Over a strong dissent, the majority therefore held that parts of the Federal Election Campaign Act of 1974 were unconstitutional since spending money was, in the majority's view, a manifestation of the right to freedom of speech under the First Amendment. This did not affect corporations, though the issue arose in Austin v Michigan Chamber of Commerce. A differently constituted US Supreme Court held, with three dissents, that the Michigan Campaign Finance Act could, compatibly with the First Amendment, prohibit political spending by corporations. However, by 2010, the Supreme Court had a different majority. In a five to four decision, Citizens United v Federal Election Commission held that corporations were persons that should be protected in the same was as natural people under the First Amendment, and so they were entitled to spend unlimited amounts of money in donations to political campaigns. This struck down the Bipartisan Campaign Reform Act of 2002, so that an anti-Hillary Clinton advertisement ("Hillary: The Movie") could be run by a pro-business lobby group. Subsequently, the same Supreme Court majority decided in 2014, in Burwell v Hobby Lobby Stores Inc that corporations were also persons for the protection of religion under the Religious Freedom Restoration Act. Specifically, this meant that a corporation had to have a right to opt out of provisions of the Patient Protection and Affordable Care Act of 2010, which could require giving health care to employees that the board of directors of the corporation might have religious objections to. It did not specifically address an alternative claim under the First Amendment. The dissenting four judges emphasized their view that previous cases provided "no support for the notion that free exercise [of religious] rights pertain to for-profit corporations." Accordingly, the issue of corporate personality has taken on an increasingly political character. Because corporations are typically capable of commanding greater economic power than individual people, and the actions of a corporation may be unduly influenced by directors and the largest shareholders, it raises the issue of the corruption of democratic politics.

=== Delegated management and agents ===
Although a corporation may be considered a separate legal person, it physically cannot act by itself. There are, therefore, necessarily rules from the corporation statutes and the law of agency that attribute the acts of real people to the corporation, to make contracts, deal with property, commission torts, and so on. First, the board of directors will be typically appointed at the first corporate meeting by whoever the articles of incorporation identify as entitled to elect them. The board is usually given the collective power to direct, manage and represent the corporation. This power (and its limits) is usually delegated to directors by the state's law, or the articles of incorporation. Second, corporation laws frequently set out roles for particular "officers" of the corporation, usually in senior management, on or outside of the board. US labor law views directors and officers as holding contracts of employment, although not for all purposes. If the state law, or the corporation's bylaws are silent, the terms of these contracts will define in further detail the role of the directors and officers. Third, directors and officers of the corporation will usually have the authority to delegate tasks, and hire employees for the jobs that need performing. Again, the terms of the employment contracts will shape the express terms on which employees act on behalf of the corporation.

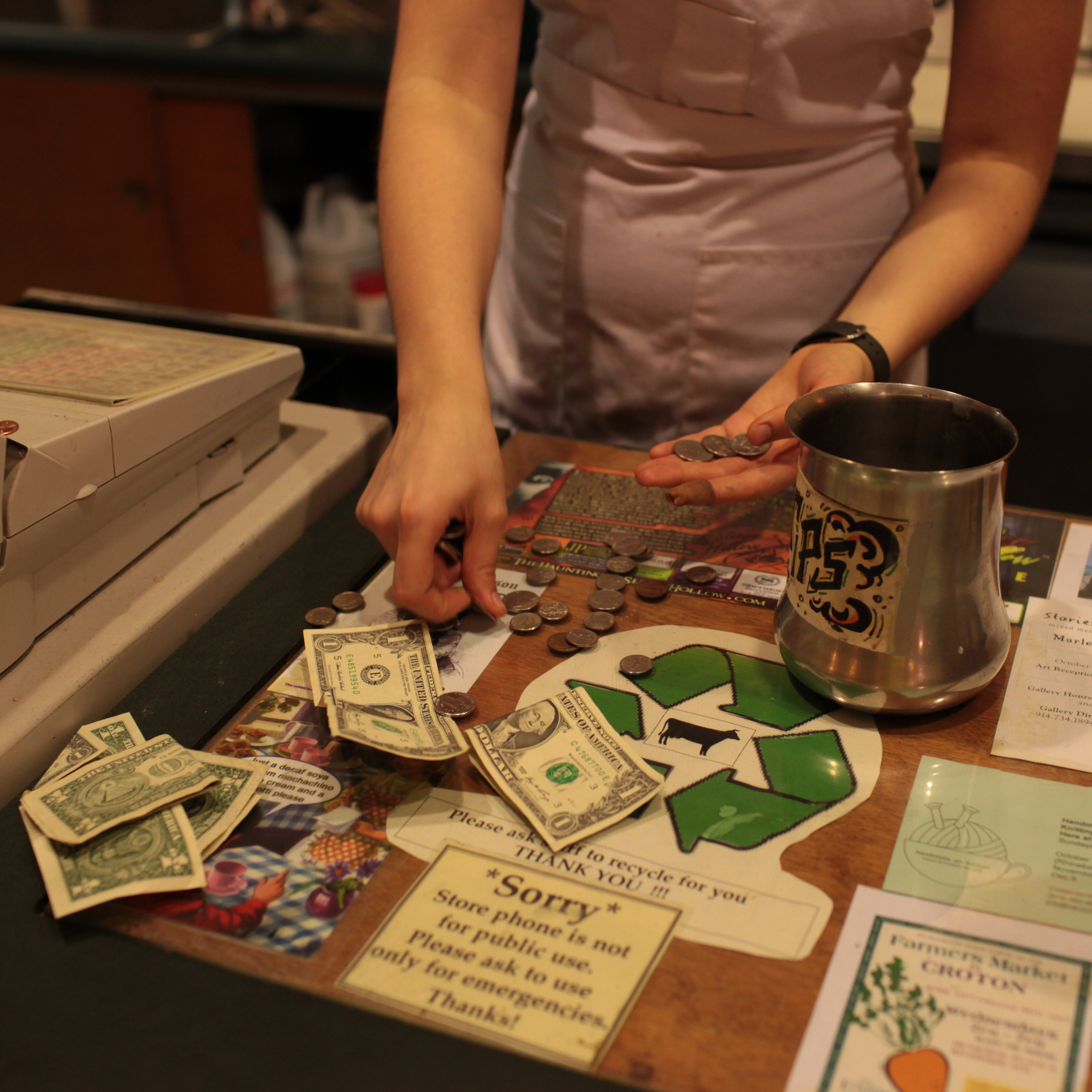
The actions of all employees, in the course of employment become those of the corporation, when it goes right or wrong because it is thought that if a corporation takes the benefits of an employee's work, it should also take the burdens.

Toward the outside world, the acts of directors, officers and other employees will be binding on the corporation depending on the law of agency and principles of vicarious liability (or respondeat superior). It used to be that the common law recognized constraints on the total capacity of the corporation. If a director or employee acted beyond the purposes or powers of the corporation (ultra vires), any contract would be ex ante void and unenforceable. This rule was abandoned in the earlier 20th century, and today corporations generally have unlimited capacity and purposes. However, not all actions by corporate agents are binding. For instance, in South Sacramento Drayage Co v Campbell Soup Co it was held that a traffic manager who worked for the Campbell Soup Company did not (unsurprisingly) have authority to enter a 15-year exclusive dealing contract for intrastate hauling of tomatoes. Standard principles of commercial agency apply ("apparent authority"). If a reasonable person would not think that an employee (given his or her position and role) has authority to enter a contract, then the corporation cannot be bound. However, corporations can always expressly confer greater authority on officers and employees, and so will be bound if the contracts give express or implied actual authority. The treatment of liability for contracts and other consent based obligations, however, differs to torts and other wrongs. Here the objective of the law to ensure the internalization of "externalities" or "enterprise risks" is generally seen to cast a wider scope of liability.

=== Shareholder liability for debts ===
One of the basic principles of modern corporate law is that people who invest in a corporation have limited liability. For example, as a general rule shareholders can only lose the money they invested in their shares. Practically, limited liability operates only as a default rule for creditors that can adjust their risk. Banks which lend money to corporations frequently contract with a corporation's directors or shareholders to get personal guarantees, or to take security interests their personal assets, or over a corporation's assets, to ensure their debts are paid in full. This means much of the time, shareholders are in fact liable beyond their initial investments. Similarly trade creditors, such as suppliers of raw materials, can use title retention clause or other device with the equivalent effect to security interests, to be paid before other creditors in bankruptcy. However, if creditors are unsecured, or for some reason guarantees and security are not enough, creditors cannot (unless there are exceptions) sue shareholders for outstanding debts. Metaphorically speaking, their liability is limited behind the "corporate veil". The same analysis, however has been rejected by the US Supreme Court in Davis v Alexander, where a railroad subsidiary company caused injury to cattle that were being transported. As Brandeis J put it, when one "company actually controls another and operates both as a single system, the dominant company will be liable for injuries due to the negligence of the subsidiary company."

There are a number of exceptions, which differ according to the law of each state, to the principle of limited liability. First, at the very least, as is recognized in public international law, courts will "pierce the corporate veil" if a corporation is being used to evade obligations in a dishonest manner. Defective organization, such as a failure to duly file the articles of incorporation with a state official, is another universally acknowledged ground. However, there is considerable diversity in state law, and controversy, over how much further the law ought to go. In Kinney Shoe Corp v Polan the Fourth Circuit Federal Court of Appeals held that it would also pierce the veil if (1) the corporation had been inadequately capitalized to meet its future obligations (2) if no corporate formalities (e.g. meetings and minutes) had been observed, or (3) the corporation was deliberately used to benefit an associated corporation. However, a subsequent opinion of the same court emphasized that piercing could not take place merely to prevent an abstract notion of "unfairness" or "injustice". A further, though technically different, equitable remedy is that according to the US Supreme Court in Taylor v Standard Gas Co corporate insiders (e.g. directors or major shareholders) who are also creditors of a company are subordinated to other creditors when the company goes bankrupt if the company is inadequately capitalized for the operations it was undertaking.

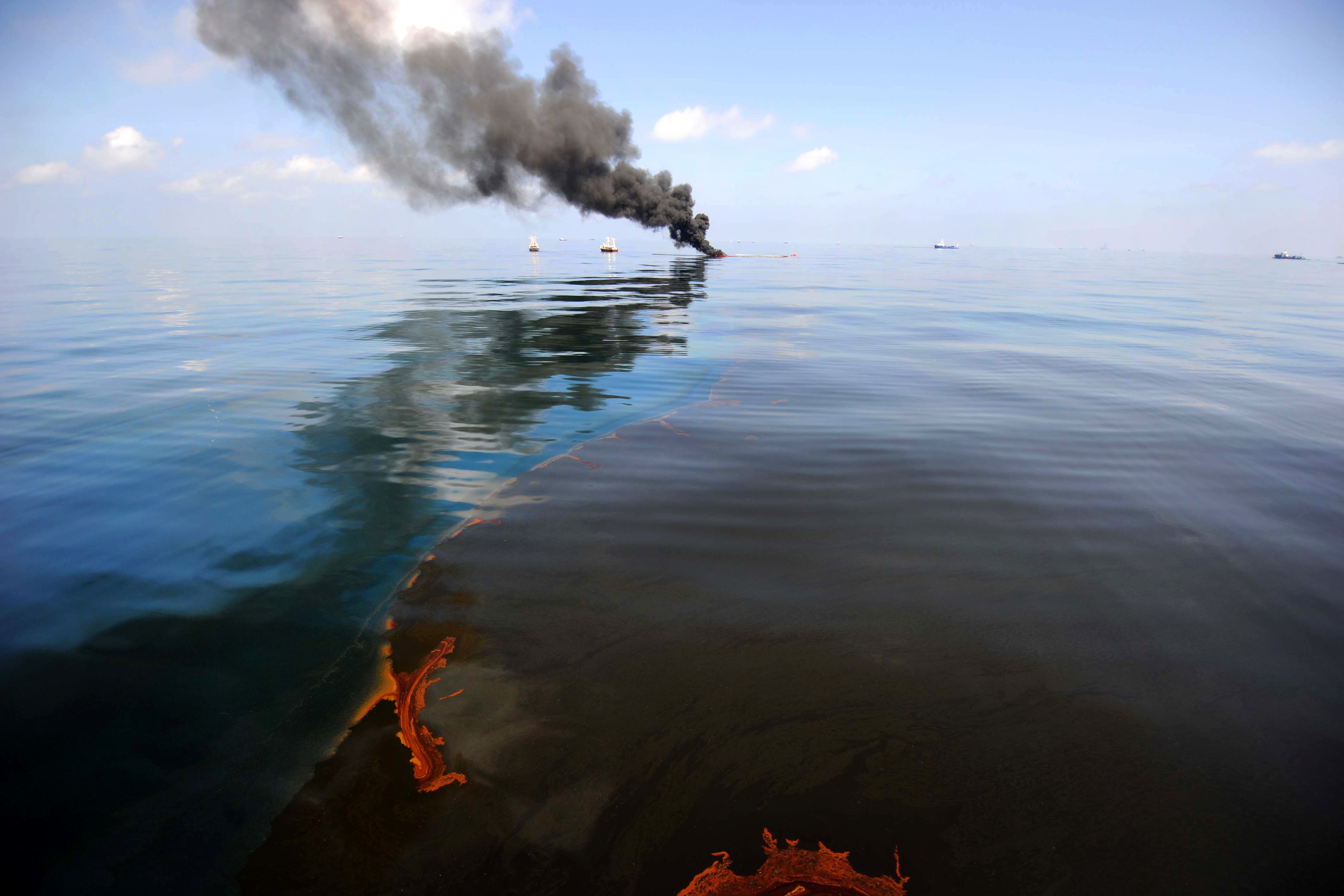
The trend in US corporate tort cases, particularly in oil spill disasters, as with The Amoco Cadiz case and in the Deepwater Horizon litigation, is to either pierce the corporate veil or hold parent corporations directly liable for the harm their enterprise causes.

Tort victims differ from commercial creditors because they have no ability to contract around limited liability, and are therefore regarded differently under most state laws. The theory developed in the mid-20th century that beyond the corporation itself, it was more appropriate for the law to recognize the economic "enterprise", which usually composes groups of corporations, where the parent takes the benefit of a subsidiary's activities and is capable of exercising decisive influence. A concept of "enterprise liability" was developed in fields such as tax law, accounting practices, and antitrust law that were gradually received into the courts' jurisprudence. Older cases had suggested that there was no special right to pierce the veil in favor of tort victims, even where pedestrians had been hit by a tram owned by a bankrupt-subsidiary corporation, or by taxi-cabs that were owned by undercapitalized subsidiary corporations. More modern authority suggested a different approach. In a case concerning one of the worst oil spills in history, caused by the Amoco Cadiz which was owned through subsidiaries of the Amoco Corporation, the Illinois court that heard the case stated that the parent corporation was liable by the fact of its group structure. The courts therefore "usually apply more stringent standards to piercing the corporate veil in a contract case than they do in tort cases" because tort claimants do not voluntarily accept limited liability. Under the Comprehensive Environmental Response, Compensation, and Liability Act of 1980, the US Supreme Court in United States v Bestfoods held if a parent corporation "actively participated in, and exercised control over, the operations of" a subsidiary's facilities it "may be held directly liable". This leaves the question of the nature of the common law, in absence of a specific statute, or where a state law forbids piercing the veil except on very limited grounds. One possibility is that tort victims go uncompensated, even while a parent corporation is solvent and has insurance. A second possibility is that a compromise liability regime, such as pro rata rather than joint and several liability is imposed across all shareholders regardless of size. A third possibility, and one that does not interfere with the basics of corporate law, is that a direct duty of care could be owed in tort to the injured person by parent corporations and major shareholders to the extent they could exercise control. This route means corporate enterprise would not gain a subsidy at the expense of other people's health and environment, and that there is no need to pierce the veil.

== Corporate governance ==
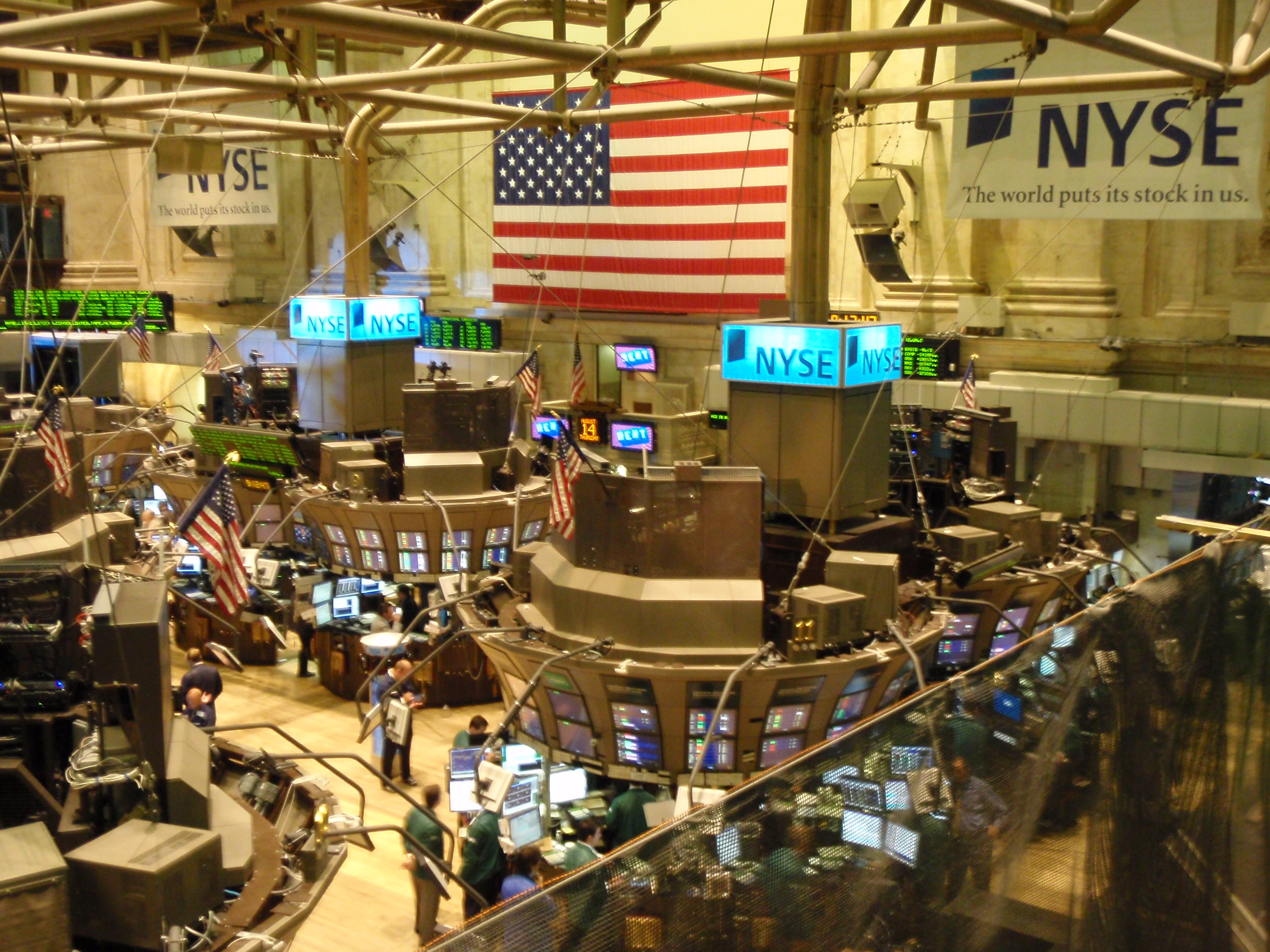
The New York Stock Exchange, along with Federal and state laws, is a significant regulator of corporate governance for listed corporations, particularly on shareholder voting rights and board structures.

Corporate governance, though used in many senses, is primarily concerned with the balance of power among the main actors in a corporation: directors, shareholders, employees, and other stakeholders. A combination of a state's corporation law, case law developed by the courts, and a corporation's own articles of incorporation and bylaws determine how power is shared. In general, the rules of a corporation's constitution can be written in whatever way its incorporators choose, or however it is subsequently amended, so long as they comply with the minimum compulsory standards of the law. Different laws seek to protect the corporate stakeholders to different degrees. Among the most important are the voting rights they exercise against the board of directors, either to elect or remove them from office. There is also the right to sue for breaches of duty, and rights of information, typically used to buy, sell and associate, or disassociate on the market. The federal Securities and Exchange Act of 1934, requires minimum standards on the process of voting, particularly in a "proxy contest" where competing groups attempt to persuade shareholders to delegate them their "proxy" vote. Shareholders also often have rights to amend the corporate constitution, call meetings, make business proposals, and have a voice on major decisions, although these can be significantly constrained by the board. Employees of US corporations have often had a voice in corporate management, either indirectly, or sometimes directly, though unlike in many major economies, express "codetermination" laws that allow participation in management have so far been rare.

=== Corporate constitutions ===
In principle, a corporation's constitution can be designed in any way so long as it complies with the compulsory rules set down by the state or federal legislature. Most state laws, and the federal government, give a broad freedom to corporations to design the relative rights of directors, shareholders, employees and other stakeholders in the articles of incorporation and the by-laws. These are written down during incorporation, and can usually be amended afterwards according to the state law's procedures, which sometimes place obstacles to amendment by a simple majority of shareholders. In the early 1819 case of Trustees of Dartmouth College v Woodward the US Supreme Court held by a majority that there was a presumption that once a corporate charter was made, the corporation's constitution was subject to "no other control on the part of the Crown than what is expressly or implicitly reserved by the charter itself." On the facts, this meant that because Dartmouth College's charter could not be amended by the New Hampshire legislature, though subsequent state corporation laws subsequently included provisions saying that this could be done. Today there is a general presumption that whatever balance of powers, rights and duties are set down in the constitution remain binding like a contract would. Most corporation statutes start with a presumption (in contrast to old ultra vires rules) that corporations may pursue any purpose that is lawful, whether that is running a profitable business, delivering services to the community, or any other objects that people involved in a corporation may choose. By default, the common law had historically suggested that all decisions are to be taken by a majority of the incorporators, and that by default the board could be removed by a majority of shareholders for a reason they themselves determined. However these default rules will take subject to the constitution that incorporators themselves define, which in turn take subject to state law and federal regulation.

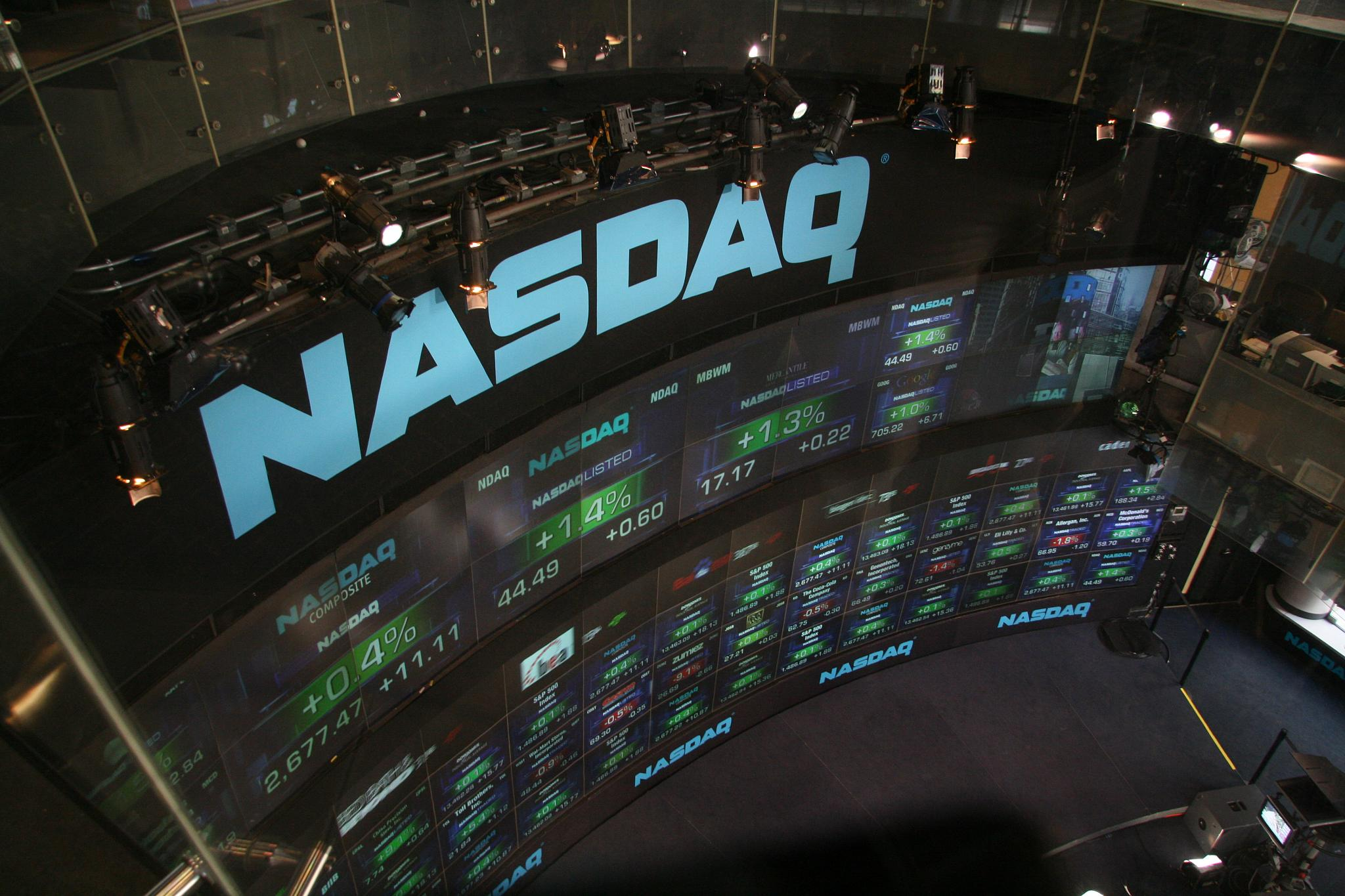
The NASDAQ is the second biggest stock in the US, after the New York Stock Exchange. It specializes in IT sector, that saw its first major crash with the Dot-com bubble of 2000.

Modern portfolio theory suggests a diversified portfolio of shares and other asset classes (such as debt in corporate bonds, treasury bonds, or money market funds) will realise more predictable returns if there is prudent market regulation.

Although it is possible to structure corporations differently, the two basic organs in a corporate constitution will invariably be the general meeting of its members (usually shareholders) and the board of directors. Boards of directors themselves have been subject in modern regulation to a growing number of requirements regarding their composition, particularly in federal law for public corporations. Particularly after the Enron scandal, companies listed on the major stock exchanges (the New York Stock Exchange, the NASDAQ, and AMEX) were required to adopt minimum standards on the number of independent directors, and their functions. These rules are enforced through the threat of delisting by the exchange, while the Securities and Exchange Commission works to ensure ultimate oversight. For example, the NYSE Listed Company Manual Rule 303A.01 requires that listed companies have a majority of "independent" directors. "Independence" is in turn defined by Rule 303A.02 as an absence of material business relationship with the corporation, not having worked for the last three years for the corporation as an employee, not receiving over $120,000 in pay, or generally having family members who are. The idea here is that "independent" directors will exercise superior oversight of the executive board members, and thus decrease the likelihood of abuse of power. Specifically, the nominations committee (which makes future board appointments), compensation committee (which sets director pay), and audit committee (which appoints the auditors), are required to be composed of independent directors, as defined by the Rules. Similar requirements for boards have proliferated across many countries, and so exchange rules allow foreign corporations that are listed on an American exchange to follow their home jurisdiction's rules, but to disclose and explain how their practices differ (if at all) to the market. The difficulty, however, is that oversight of executive directors by independent directors still leaves the possibility of personal relationships that develop into a conflict of interest. This raises the importance of the rights that can be exercised against the board as a whole.

=== Shareholder rights ===
While the board of directors is generally conferred the power to manage the day-to-day affairs of a corporation, either by the statute, or by the articles of incorporation, this is always subject to limits, including the rights that shareholders have. For example, the Delaware General Corporation Law §141(a) says the "business and affairs of every corporation ... shall be managed by or under the direction of a board of directors, except as may be otherwise provided in this chapter or in its certificate of incorporation." However, directors themselves are ultimately accountable to the general meeting through the vote. Invariably, shareholders hold the voting rights, though the extent to which these are useful can be conditioned by the constitution. The DGCL §141(k) gives an option to corporations to have a unitary board that can be removed by a majority of members "without cause" (i.e. a reason determined by the general meeting and not by a court), which reflects the old default common law position. However, Delaware corporations may also opt for a classified board of directors (e.g. where only a third of directors come up for election each year) where directors can only be removed "with cause" scrutinized by the courts. More corporations have classified boards after initial public offerings than a few years after going public, because institutional investors typically seek to change the corporation's rules to make directors more accountable. In principle, shareholders in Delaware corporations can make appointments to the board through a majority vote, and can also act to expand the size of the board and elect new directors with a majority. However, directors themselves will often control which candidates can be nominated to be appointed to the board. Under the Dodd-Frank Act of 2010, §971 empowered the Securities and Exchange Commission to write a new SEC Rule 14a-11 that would allow shareholders to propose nominations for board candidates. The Act required the SEC to evaluate the economic effects of any rules it wrote, however when it did, the Business Roundtable challenged this in court. In Business Roundtable v SEC, Ginsburg J in the DC Circuit Court of Appeals went as far to say that the SEC had "acted arbitrarily and capriciously" in its rule making. After this, the Securities and Exchange Commission failed to challenge the decision, and abandoned drafting new rules. This means that in many corporations, directors continue to have a monopoly on nominating future directors.

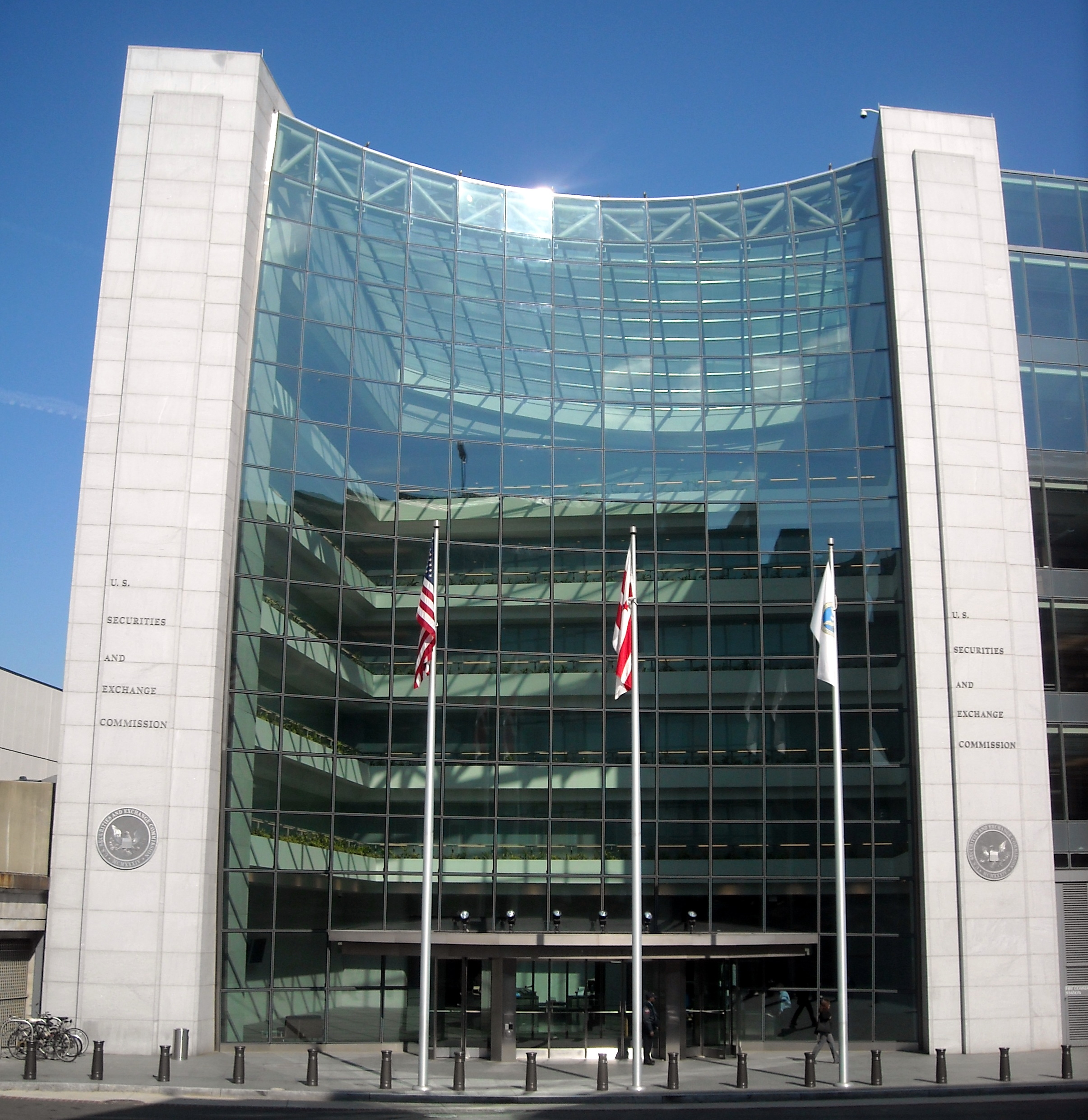
The Securities and Exchange Commission has a statutory duty to regulate some aspects of director elections and shareholder voting rights, though its rule-making authority has continually been challenged by the Business Roundtable.

Apart from elections of directors, shareholders' entitlements to vote have been significantly protected by federal regulation, either through stock exchanges or the Securities and Exchange Commission. Beginning in 1927, the New York Stock Exchange maintained a "one share, one vote" policy, which was backed by the Securities and Exchange Commission from 1940. This was thought to be necessary to halt corporations issuing non-voting shares, except to banks and other influential corporate insiders. However, in 1986, under competitive pressure from NASDAQ and AMEX, the NYSE sought to abandon the rule, and the SEC quickly drafted a new Rule 19c-4, requiring the one share, one vote principle. In Business Roundtable v SEC the DC Circuit Court of Appeals struck the rule down, though the exchanges and the SEC subsequently made an agreement to regulate shareholder voting rights "proportionately". Today, many corporations have unequal shareholder voting rights, up to a limit of ten votes per share. Stronger rights exist regarding shareholders ability to delegate their votes to nominees, or doing "proxy voting" under the Securities and Exchange Act of 1934. Its provisions were introduced to combat the accumulation of power by directors or management friendly voting trusts after the Wall Street crash. Under SEC Rule 14a-1, proxy votes cannot be solicited except under its rules. Generally, one person soliciting others' proxy votes requires disclosure, although SEC Rule 14a-2 was amended in 1992 to allow shareholders to be exempt from filing requirements when simply communicating with one another, and therefore to take collective action against a board of directors more easily. SEC Rule 14a-9 prohibits any false or misleading statements being made in soliciting proxies. This all matters in a proxy contest, or whenever shareholders wish to change the board or another element of corporate policy. Generally speaking, and especially under Delaware law, this remains difficult. Shareholders often have no rights to call meetings unless the constitution allows, and in any case the conduct of meetings is often controlled by directors under a corporation's by-laws. However, under SEC Rule 14a-8, shareholders have a right to put forward proposals, but on a limited number of topics (and not director elections).

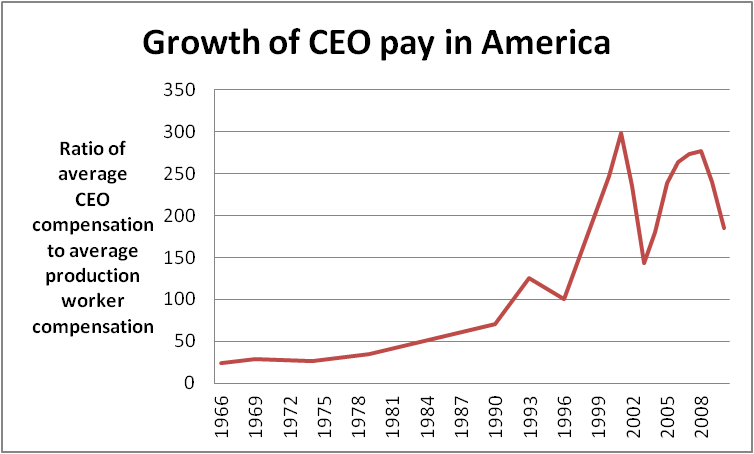
Ratio of average pay of CEOs and production workers within a corporation from 1965 to 2009, not taking into account outsourced workers, or supply chains

On a number of issues that are seen as very significant, or where directors have incurable conflicts of interest, many states and federal legislation give shareholders specific rights to veto or approve business decisions. Generally state laws give the right for shareholders to vote on decision by the corporation to sell off "all or substantially all assets" of the corporation. However fewer states give rights to shareholder to veto political contributions made by the board, unless this is in the articles of incorporation. One of the most contentious issues is the right for shareholders to have a "say on pay" of directors. As executive pay has grown beyond inflation, while average worker wages remained stagnant, this was seen important enough to regulate in the Dodd-Frank Act of 2010 §951. This provision, however, simply introduced a non-binding vote for shareholders, though better rights can always be introduced in the articles of incorporation. While some institutional shareholders, particularly pension funds, have been active in using shareholder rights, asset managers regulated by the Investment Advisers Act of 1940 have tended to be mute in opposing corporate boards, as they are often themselves disconnected from the people whose money they are voting upon.

=== Investor rights ===
Most state corporate laws require shareholders have governance rights against boards of directors, but fewer states guarantee governance rights to the real investors of capital. Currently investment managers control most voting rights in the economy using "other people's money". Investment management firms, such as Vanguard, Fidelity, Morgan Stanley or BlackRock, are often delegated the task of trading fund assets from three main types of institutional investors: pension funds, life insurance companies, and mutual funds. These are usually substitutes to save for retirement. Pensions are most important kind, but can be organized through different legal forms. Investment managers, who are subject to the Employee Retirement Income Security Act of 1974, are then often delegated the task of investment management. Over time, investment managers have also vote on corporate shares, assisted by a "proxy advice" firm such as ISS or Glass Lewis. Under ERISA 1974 §1102(a), a plan must merely have named fiduciaries who have "authority to control and manage the operation and administration of the plan", selected by "an employer or employee organization" or both jointly. Usually these fiduciaries or trustees, will delegate management to a professional firm, particularly because under §1105(d), if they do so, they will not be liable for an investment manager's breaches of duty. These investment managers buy a range of assets (e.g. government bonds, corporate bonds, commodities, real estate or derivatives) but particularly corporate stocks which have voting rights.

The largest form of retirement fund has become the 401(k) defined contribution scheme. This is often an individual account that an employer sets up, named after the Internal Revenue Code §401(k), which allows employers and employees to defer tax on money that is saved in the fund until an employee retires. The individual invariably loses any voice over how shareholder voting rights that their money buys will be exercised. Investment management firms, that are regulated by the Investment Company Act of 1940, the Investment Advisers Act of 1940 and ERISA 1974, will almost always take shareholder voting rights. By contrast, larger and collective pension funds, many still defined benefit schemes such as CalPERS or TIAA, organize to take voting in house, or to instruct their investment managers. Two main types of pension fund to do this are labor union organized Taft-Hartley plans, and state public pension plans. A major example of a mixture is TIAA, established on the initiative of Andrew Carnegie in 1918, which requires participants to have voting rights for the plan trustees. Under the amended National Labor Relations Act of 1935 §302(c)(5)(B) a union organized plan has to be jointly managed by representatives of employers and employees. Many local pension funds are not consolidated and have had critical funding notices from the U.S. Department of Labor. But more funds with beneficiary representation ensure that corporate voting rights are cast according to the preferences of their members. State public pensions are often larger, and have greater bargaining power to use on their members' behalf. State pension schemes usually disclose the way trustees are selected. In 2005, on average more than a third of trustees were elected by employees or beneficiaries. For example, the California Government Code §20090 requires that its public employee pension fund, CalPERS has 13 members on its board, 6 elected by employees and beneficiaries. However, only pension funds of sufficient size have acted to replace investment manager voting. No federal law requires voting rights for employees in pension funds, despite several proposals. For example, the Joint Trusteeship Bill of 1989, sponsored by Peter Visclosky in the US House of Representatives, would have required all single employer pension plans to have trustees appointed equally by employers and employee representatives. There is also currently no legislation to stop investment managers voting with other people's money, in the way that the Securities Exchange Act of 1934 §78f(b)(10) bans broker-dealers voting on significant issues without instructions.

=== Employee rights ===
... while there are many contributing causes to unrest, that there is one cause which is fundamental. That is the necessary conflict – the contrast between our political liberty and our industrial absolutism. We are as free politically, perhaps, as free as it is possible for us to be ... On the other had, in dealing with industrial problems, the position of the ordinary worker is exactly the reverse. The individual employee has no effective voice or vote. And the main objection, as I see it, to the very large corporation is, that it makes possible – and in many cases makes inevitable – the exercise of industrial absolutism ... The social justice for which we are striving is an incident of our democracy, not its main end… the end for which we must strive is the attainment of rule by the people, and that involves industrial democracy as well as political democracy.

— Louis Brandeis, Testimony to Commission on Industrial Relations (1916) vol 8, 7659–7660

While investment managers tend to exercise most voting rights in corporations, bought with pension, life insurance and mutual fund money, employees also exercise voice through collective bargaining rules in labor law. Increasingly, corporate law has converged with labor law. The United States is in a minority of Organisation for Economic Co-operation and Development countries that, as yet, has no law requiring employee voting rights in corporations, either in the general meeting or for representatives on the board of directors. On the other hand, the United States has the oldest voluntary codetermination statute for private corporations, in Massachusetts since 1919 passed under the Republican governor Calvin Coolidge, enabling manufacturing companies to have employee representatives on the board of directors, if corporate stockholders agreed. Also in 1919 both Procter & Gamble and the General Ice Delivery Company of Detroit had employee representation on boards. In the early 20th century, labor law theory split between those who advocated collective bargaining backed by strike action, those who advocated a greater role for binding arbitration, and proponents codetermination as "industrial democracy". Today, these methods are seen as complements, not alternatives. A majority of countries in the Organisation for Economic Co-operation and Development have laws requiring direct participation rights. In 1994, the Dunlop Commission on the Future of Worker-Management Relations: Final Report examined law reform to improve collective labor relations, and suggested minor amendments to encourage worker involvement. Congressional division prevented federal reform, but labor unions and state legislatures have experimented.

The United Auto Workers at the Chrysler Corporation successfully made a collective agreement in 1980 to have employee directors on the board. Shareholding institutions tend to monopolize voting rights in corporations.

Corporations are chartered under state law, the larger mostly in Delaware, but leave investors free to organize voting rights and board representation as they choose. Because of unequal bargaining power, but also historic caution of labor unions, shareholders monopolize voting rights in American corporations. From the 1970s employees and unions sought representation on company boards. This could happen through collective agreements, as it historically occurred in Germany or other countries, or through employees demanding further representation through employee stock ownership plans, but they aimed for voice independent from capital risks that could not be diversified. Corporations included where workers attempted to secure board represented included United Airlines, the General Tire and Rubber Company, and the Providence and Worcester Railroad. However, in 1974 the Securities and Exchange Commission, run by appointees of Richard Nixon, rejected that employees who held shares in AT&T were entitled to make proposals to include employee representatives on the board of directors. This position was eventually reversed expressly by the Dodd-Frank Act of 2010 §971, which subject to rules by the Securities and Exchange Commission entitles shareholders to put forward nominations for the board. Instead of pursuing board seats through shareholder resolutions, for example, the United Auto Workers successfully sought board representation by collective agreement at Chrysler in 1980, and the United Steel Workers secured board representation in five corporations in 1993. However, it was clear that employee stock ownership plans were open to abuse, particularly after Enron collapsed in 2003. Workers had been enticed to invest an average of 62.5 per cent of their retirement savings from 401(k) plans in Enron stock, against basic principles of prudent, diversified investment, and had no board representation. This meant, employees lost a majority of pension savings. For this reason, employees and unions have sought representation simply for investment of labor, without taking on undiversifiable capital risk. Empirical research suggests by 1999 there were at least 35 major employee representation plans with worker directors, though often linked to corporate stock.

== Officers' and directors' duties ==
While corporate constitutions typically set out the balance of power between directors, shareholders, employees and other stakeholders, additional duties are owed by members of the board to the corporation as a whole. First, rules can restrain or empower the directors in whose favor they exercise their discretion. While older corporate law judgments suggested directors had to promote "shareholder value", most modern state laws empower directors to exercise their own "business judgment" in the way they balance the claims of shareholders, employees, and other stakeholders. Second, all state laws follow the historical pattern of fiduciary duties to require that directors avoid conflicts of interest between their own pursuit of profit, and the interests of the corporation. The exact standard, however, may be more or less strict. Third, many states require some kind of basic duty of care in performance of a director's tasks, just as minimum standards of care apply in any contract for services. However, Delaware has increasingly abandoned objective duties of care, and allows liability waivers.

On January 25, 2023, the Delaware Court of Chancery ruled that McDonald's former global chief people officer could be sued by shareholders who accused him of allowing a "culture of sexual misconduct and harassment to develop" at the company, clarifying that "corporate officers owe a duty of oversight." This landmark decision represented the first time that Delaware courts had explicitly recognized an officer-level fiduciary duty of oversight. The stockholders in this derivative lawsuit are represented by lawyers from Grant & Eisenhofer P.A., Scott + Scott Attorneys at Law LLP, and Newman Ferrara LLP.

=== Stakeholder interests ===
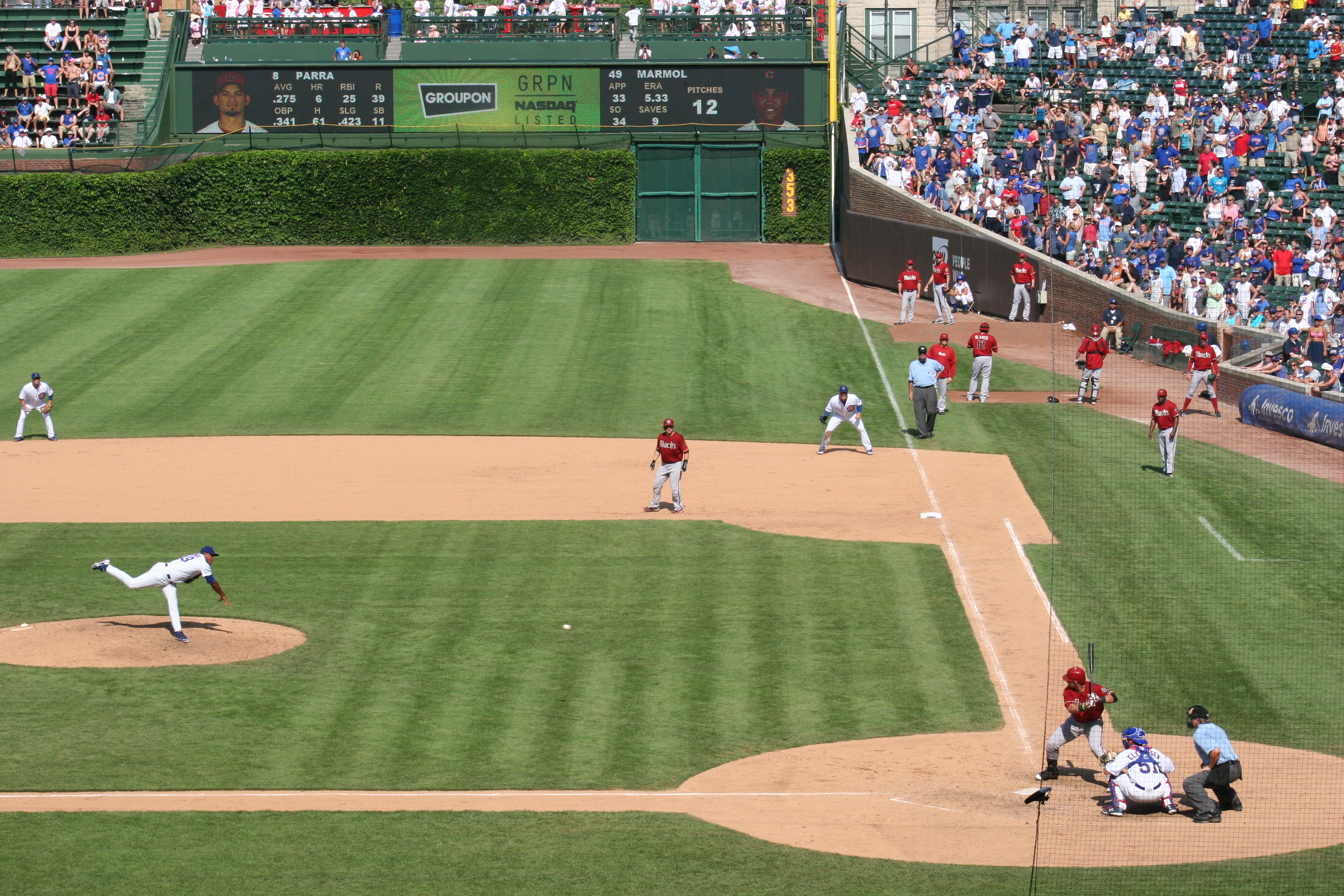
Most states follow the approach in Shlensky v Wrigley, that directors do not only need to maximize shareholder profits. They can balance the interests of all stakeholders, as in a decision to not put in floodlights to play nighttime baseball games, in the community's interest.

Most corporate laws empower directors, as part of their management functions, to determine which strategies will promote a corporation's success in the interests of all stakeholders. Directors will periodically decide whether and how much of a corporation's revenue should be shared among directors' own pay, the pay for employees (e.g. whether to increase or not next financial year), the dividends or other returns to shareholders, whether to lower or raise prices for consumers, whether to retain and reinvest earnings in the business, or whether to make charitable and other donations. Most states have enacted "constituency statutes", which state expressly that directors are empowered to balance the interests of all stakeholders in the way that their conscience, or good faith decisions would dictate. This discretion typically applies when making a decision about the distribution of corporate resources among different groups, or in whether to defend against a takeover bid. For example, in Shlensky v Wrigley the president of the Chicago Cubs baseball team was sued by stockholders for allegedly failing to pursue the objective of shareholder profit maximization. The president had decided the corporation would not install flood lights over the baseball ground that would have allowed games to take place at night, because he wished to ensure baseball games were accessible for families, before children's bed time. The Illinois court held that this decision was sound because even though it could have made more money, the director was entitled to regard the interests of the community as more important. Following a similar logic in AP Smith Manufacturing Co v Barlow a New Jersey court held that the directors were entitled to make a charitable donation to Princeton University on the basis because there was "no suggestion that it was made indiscriminately or to a pet charity of the corporate directors in furtherance of personal rather than corporate ends." So long as the directors could not be said to have conflicting interests, their actions would be sustained.

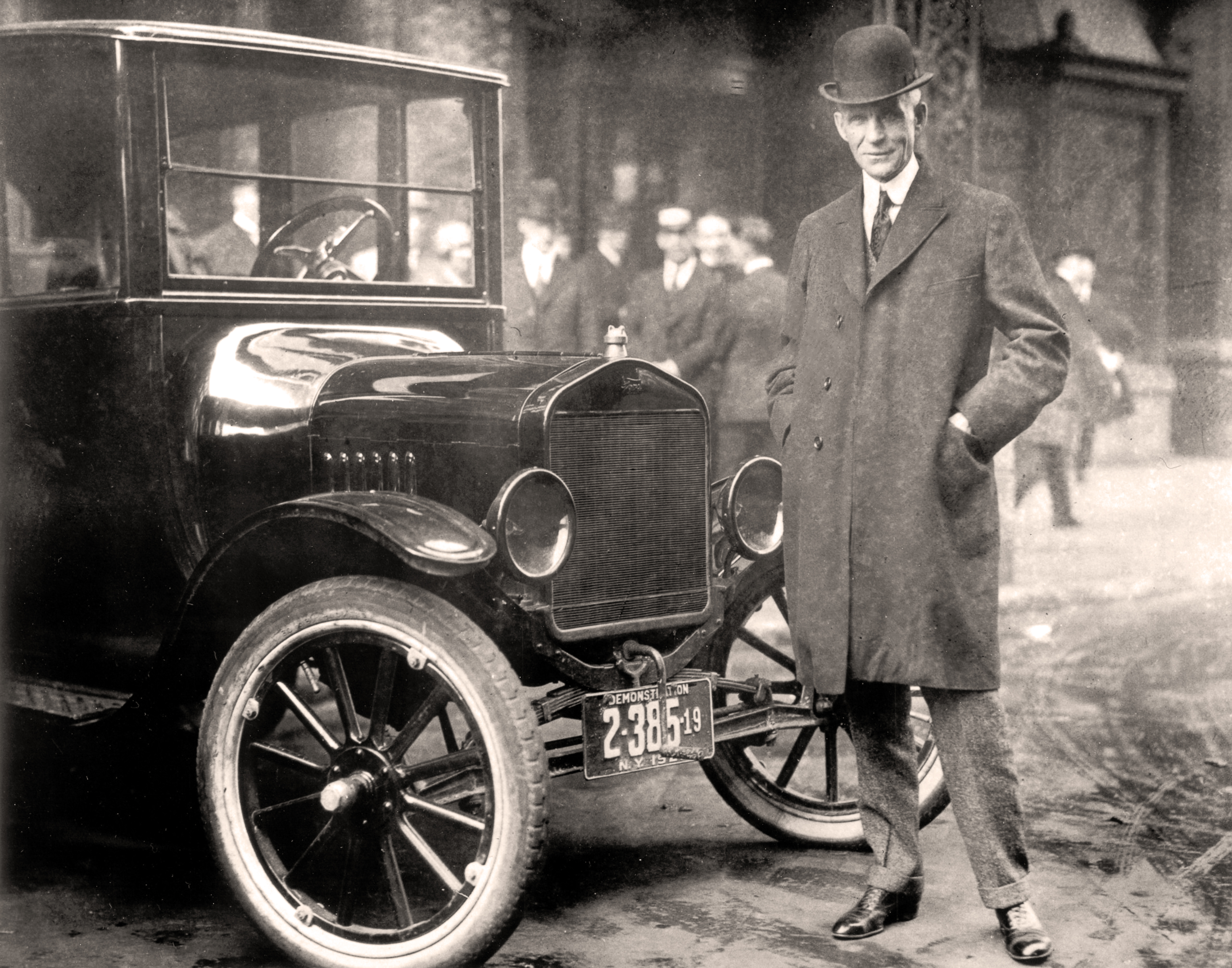
Dodge v Ford Motor Co notoriously held in 1919 that corporations had to be run "primarily for the profit of the stockholders" though most states, and the Supreme Court, have since followed the view that directors must balance all stakeholders' interests.

Delaware's law has also followed the same general logic, even though it has no specific constituency or stakeholder statute. The standard is, however, contested largely among business circles which favor a view that directors should act in the sole interests of shareholder value. Judicial support for this aim is typically found in a case from Michigan in 1919, called Dodge v Ford Motor Company. Here, the Ford Motor Company president Henry Ford had publicly announced that he wished not merely to maximize shareholder returns but to raise employee wages, decrease the price of cars for consumers, because he wished, as he put it, "to spread the benefits of this industrial system to the greatest possible number". A group of shareholders sued, and the Michigan Supreme Court said in an obiter dictum that a "business corporation is organized and carried on primarily for the profit of the stockholders. The powers of the directors are to be employed for that end." However, in the case itself a damages claim against Ford did not succeed, and since then Michigan law has been changed. The US Supreme Court has also made it clear in Burwell v Hobby Lobby Stores Inc that shareholder value is not a default or overriding aim of corporate law, unless a corporation's rules expressly opt to define such an objective. In practice, many corporations do operate for the benefit of shareholders, but this is less because of duties, and more because shareholders typically exercise a monopoly on the control rights over electing the board. This assumes, however, that directors do not merely use their office to further their own personal goals over the interests of shareholders, employees, and other stakeholders.

=== Conflicts of interest ===
Since the earliest corporations were formed, courts have imposed minimum standards to prevent directors using their office to pursue their own interests over the interests of the corporation. Directors can have no conflict of interest. In trusts law, this core fiduciary duty was formulated after the collapse of the South Sea Company in 1719 in the United Kingdom. Keech v Sandford held that people in fiduciary positions had to avoid any possibility of a conflict of interest, and this rule "should be strictly pursued". It was later held that no inquiry should be made into transactions where the fiduciary was interested in both sides of the deal. These principles of equity were received into the law of the United States, and in a modern formulation Cardozo J said in Meinhard v Salmon that the law required "the punctilio of an honor the most sensitive ... at a level higher than that trodden by the crowd."

The standards applicable to directors, however, began to depart significantly from traditional principles of equity that required "no possibility" of conflict regarding corporate opportunities, and "no inquiry" into the actual terms of transactions if tainted by self-dealing. In a Delaware decision from 1939, Guth v Loft Inc, it was held that Charles Guth, the president of a drink manufacturer named Loft Inc., had breached his duty to avoid conflicts of interest by purchasing the Pepsi company and its syrup recipe in his own name, rather than offering it to Loft Inc. However, although the duty was breached, the Delaware Supreme Court held that the court will look at the particular circumstances, and will not regard a conflict as existing if the company it lacked finances to take the opportunity, if it is not in the same line of business, or did not have an "interest or reasonable expectancy". More recently, in Broz v Cellular Information Systems Inc, it was held that a non-executive director of CIS Inc, a man named Mr Broz, had not breached his duty when he bought telecommunications licenses for the Michigan area for his own company, RFB Cellular Inc. CIS Inc had been shedding licenses at the time, and so Broz alleged that he thought there was no need to inquire whether CIS Inc would be interested. CIS Inc was then taken over, and the new owners pushed for the claim to be brought. The Delaware Supreme Court held that because CIS Inc had not been financially capable at the time to buy licenses, and so there was no actual conflict of interest. In order to be sure, or at least avoid litigation, the Delaware General Corporation Law §144 provides that directors cannot be liable, and a transaction cannot be voidable if it was (1) approved by disinterested directors after full disclosure (2) approved by shareholders after disclosure, or (3) approved by a court as fair.

- Miller v Miller, 222 NW.2d 71 (1974)

Corporate officers and directors may pursue business transactions that benefit themselves as long as they can prove the transaction, although self-interested, was nevertheless intrinsically "fair" to the corporation.

- Lieberman v Becker, 38 Del Ch 540, 155 A 2d 596 (Super Ct 1959)
- DGCL §144 contains the rule that the burden for proving unfairness remains on plaintiff after disclosure
- Flieger v Lawrence, 361 A2d 218 (Del 1976) the burden of proof shifts onto the plaintiff to show a transaction was conflicted if approval by disinterested stockholders or directors has been given to a transaction. Also Remillard Brick Co v Remillard-Dandini Co, 109 Cal App2d 405 (1952)
- Oberly v Kirby, 592 A2d 445, 467 (Del 1991)
- Cinerama Inc v Technicolor Inc, 663 A2d 1156, 1170 (Del. 1995)
- Benihana of Tokyo Inc v Benihana Inc., 906 A2d 114 (Del. 2006)

=== Duty of care ===
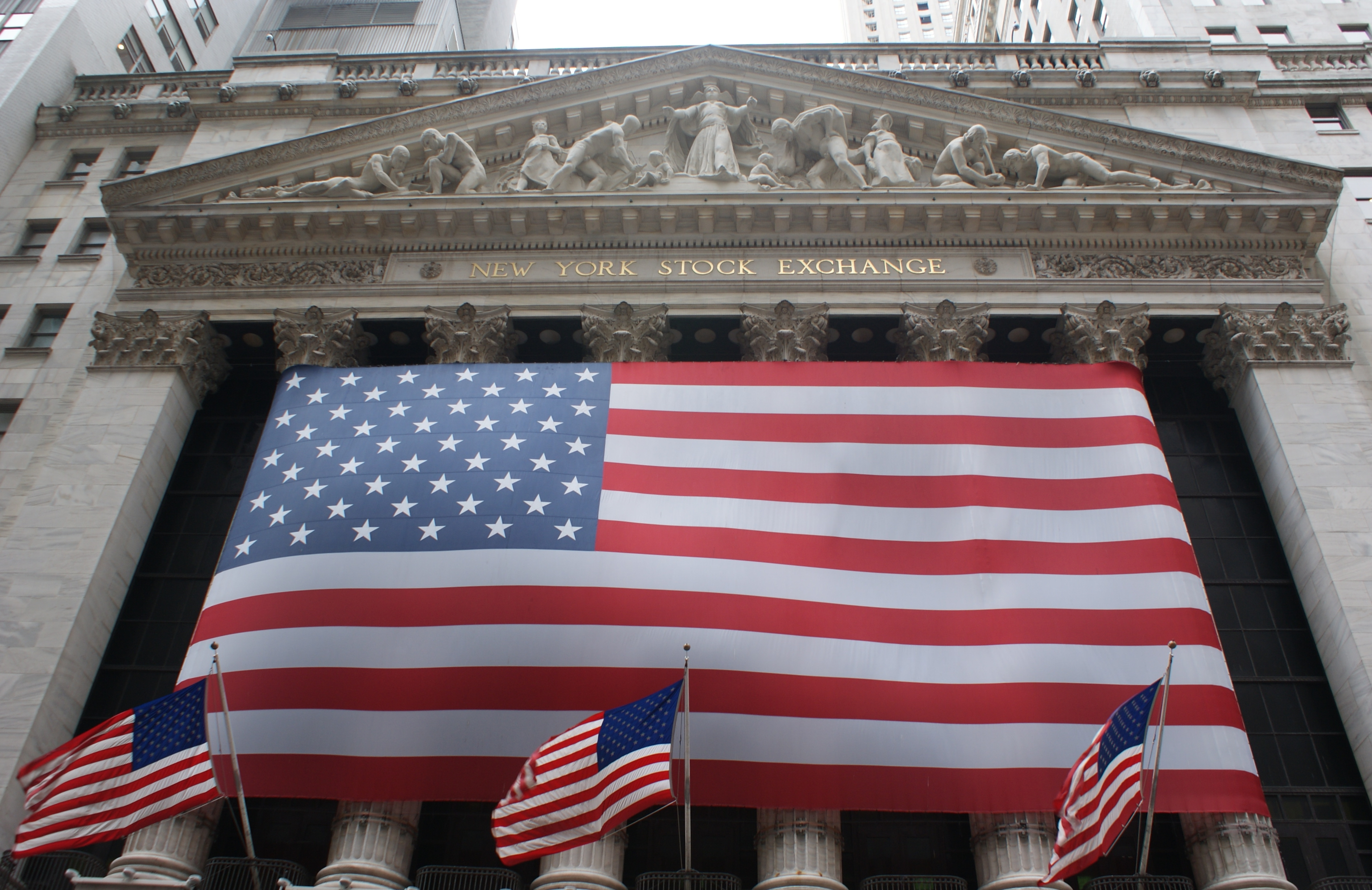
In Ultramares Corporation v Touche, a case concerning Touche, Niven & Company (now Deloitte) across from the NYSE, Cardozo CJ held that the ordinary duty of care applicable to professionals performing services requires people to act "with the care and caution proper to their calling".

The duty of care that is owed by all people performing services for others is, in principle, also applicable to directors of corporations. Generally speaking, the duty of care requires an objective standard of diligence and skill when people perform services, which could be expected from a reasonable person in a similar position (e.g. auditors must act "with the care and caution proper to their calling", and builders must perform their work in line with "industry standards"). In a 1742 decision of the English Court of Chancery, The Charitable Corporation v Sutton, the directors of the Charitable Corporation, which gave out small loans to the needy, were held liable for failing to keep procedures in place that would have prevented three officers defrauding the corporation of a vast sum of money. Lord Hardwicke, noting that a director's office was of a "mixed nature", partly "of the nature of a public office" and partly like "agents" employed in "trust", held that the directors were liable. Though they were not to be judged with hindsight, Lord Hardwicke said he could "never determine that frauds of this kind are out of the reach of courts of law or equity, for an intolerable grievance would follow from such a determination." Many states have similarly maintained an objective baseline duty of care for corporate directors, while acknowledging different levels of care can be expected from directors of small or large corporations, and from directors with executive or non-executive roles on the board. However, in Delaware, as in a number of other states, the existence of a duty of care has become increasingly uncertain.

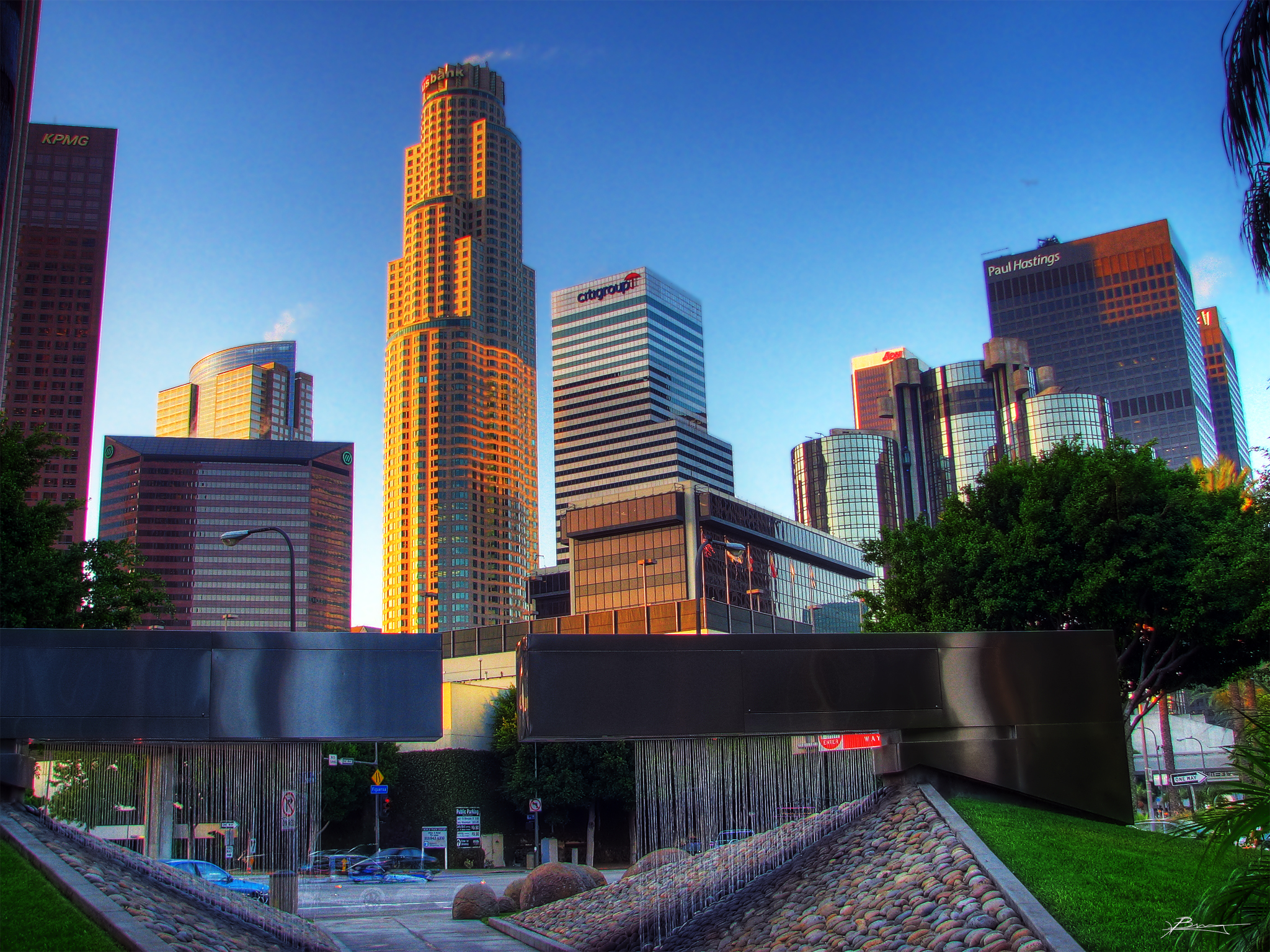
In re Citigroup Inc Shareholder Derivative Litigation ensured that no director of any major banking corporation could be held liable for breach of the duty of care, even though its risky practices caused the 2008 financial crisis.

In 1985, the Delaware Supreme Court passed one of its most debated judgments, Smith v Van Gorkom. The directors of TransUnion, including Jerome W. Van Gorkom, were sued by the shareholders for failing to adequately research the corporation's value, before approving a sale price of $55 per share to the Marmon Group. The Court held that to be a protected business judgment, "the directors of a corporation [must have] acted on an informed basis, in good faith and in the honest belief that the action taken was in the best interests of the company." Failing to act on an informed basis, if it caused loss, would amount to gross negligence, and here the directors were liable. The decision triggered a panic among corporate boards which believed they would be exposed to massive liability, and insurance firms who feared rising costs of providing directors and officers liability insurance to corporate boards. In response to lobbying, the Delaware General Corporation Law was amended to insert a new §102(b)(7). This allowed corporations to give directors immunity from liability for breach of the duty of care in their charter. However, for those corporations which did not introduce liability waivers, the courts subsequently proceeded to reduce the duty of care outright. In 1996, In re Caremark International Inc. Derivative Litigation required "an utter failure to attempt to assure a reasonable information and reporting system exists", and in 2003 In re Walt Disney Derivative Litigation went further. Chancellor Chandler held directors could only be liable for showing "reckless indifference to or a deliberate disregard of the whole body of stockholders" through actions that are "without the bounds of reason". In one of the cases that came out of the 2008 financial crisis, the same line of reasoning was deployed in In re Citigroup Inc Shareholder Derivative Litigation. Chancellor Chandler, confirming his previous opinions in Re Walt Disney and the dicta of Re Caremark, held that the directors of Citigroup could not be liable for failing to have a warning system in place to guard against potential losses from sub-prime mortgage debt. Although there had been several indications of the significant risks, and Citigroup's practices along with its competitors were argued to have contributed to crashing the international economy, Chancellor Chandler held that "plaintiffs would ultimately have to prove bad faith conduct by the director defendants". This suggested that Delaware law had effectively negated any substantive duty of care. This suggested that corporate directors were exempt from duties that any other professional performing services would owe.

=== Derivative suits ===
Because directors owe their duties to the corporation and not, as a general rule, to specific shareholders or stakeholders, the right to sue for breaches of directors duty rests by default with the corporation itself. The corporation is necessarily party to the suit. This creates a difficulty because almost always, the right to litigate falls under the general powers of directors to manage the corporation day to day (e.g. Delaware General Corporation Law §141(a)). Often, cases arise (such as in Broz v Cellular Information Systems Inc) where an action is brought against a director because the corporation has been taken over and a new, non-friendly board is in place, or because the board has been replaced after bankruptcy. Otherwise, there is a possibility of a conflict of interest because directors will be reluctant to sue their colleagues, particularly when they develop personal ties. The law has sought to define further cases where groups other than directors can sue for breaches of duty. First, many jurisdictions outside the US allow a specific percentage of shareholders to bring a claim as of right (e.g. 1 per cent). This solution may still entail significant collective action problems where shareholders are dispersed, like the US. Second, some jurisdictions give standing to sue to non-shareholder groups, particularly creditors, whose collective action problems are less. Otherwise, third, the main alternative is that any individual shareholder may "derive" a claim on the corporation's behalf to sue for breach of duty, but such a derivative suit will be subject to permission from the court.

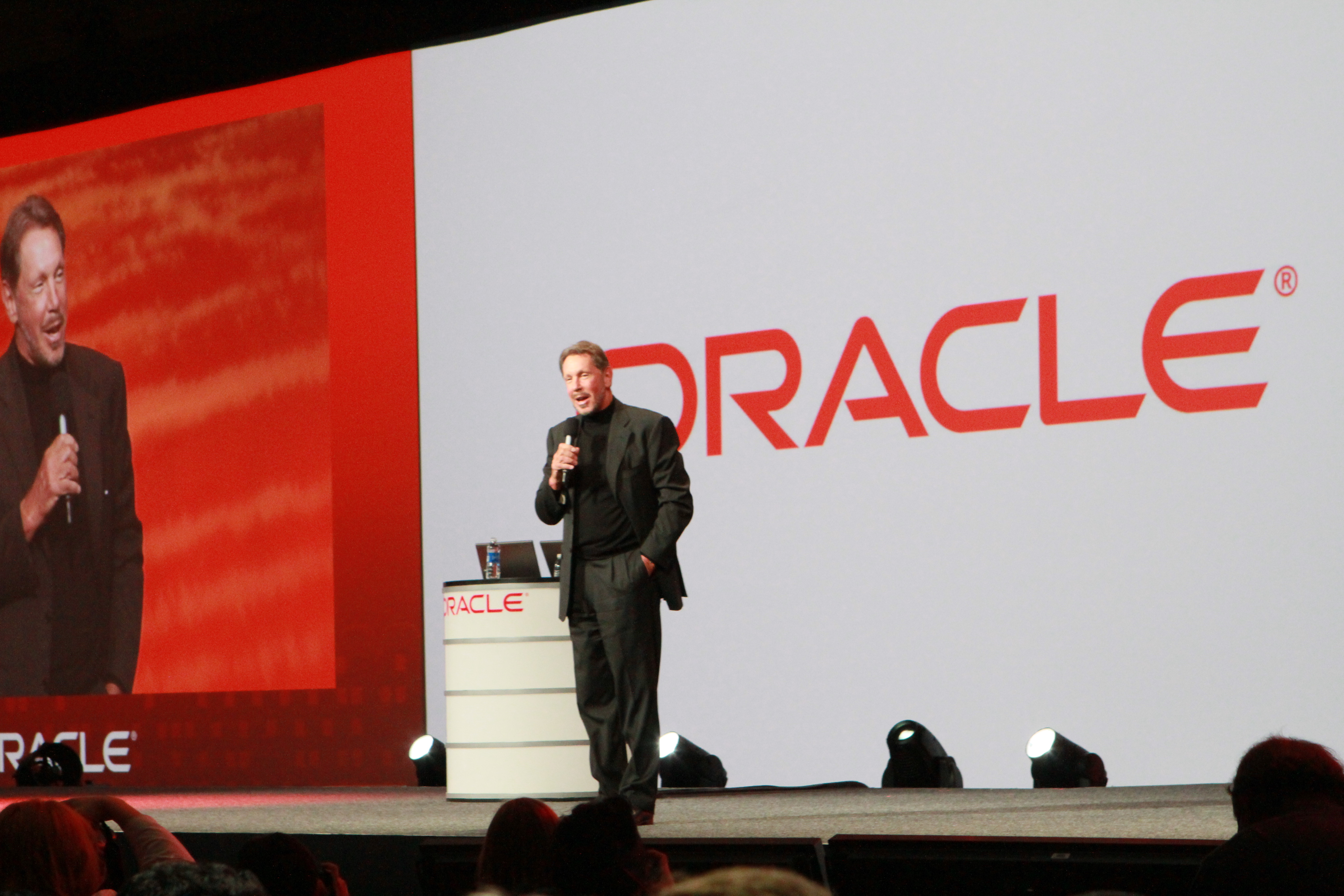
Increasingly courts have denied that the board should restrict derivative suits, as in the 2003 case In re Oracle Corp Derivative Litigation where it was held that an insider trading claim against Oracle Corp CEO Larry Ellison could proceed.

The risk of allowing individual shareholders to bring derivative suits is usually thought to be that it could encourage costly, distracting litigation, or "strike suits" – or simply that litigation (even if the director is guilty of a breach of duty) could be seen as counterproductive by a majority of shareholders or stakeholders who have no conflicts of interest. Accordingly, it is generally thought that oversight by the court is justified to ensure derivative suits match the corporation's interests as a whole because courts may be more independent. However, especially from the 1970s some states, and especially Delaware, began also to require that the board have a role. Most common law jurisdictions have abandoned role for the board in derivative claims, and in most US states before the 1980s, the board's role was no more than a formality. But then, a formal role for the board was reintroduced. In the procedure to bring a derivative suit, the first step is often that the shareholder had to make a "demand" on the board to bring a claim. Although it might appear strange to ask a group of directors who will be sued, or whose colleagues are being sued, for permission, Delaware courts took the view that the decision to litigate ought by default to lie within the legitimate scope of directors' business judgment. For example, in Aronson v Lewis a shareholder of the Meyers Parking System Inc claimed that the board had improperly wasted corporate assets by giving its 75-year-old director, Mr Fink, a large salary and bonus for consultancy work even though the contract did not require performance of any work. Mr Fink had also personally selected all of the directors. Nevertheless, Moore J. held for the Delaware Supreme Court that there was still a requirement to make a demand on the board before a derivative suit could be brought. There was "a presumption that in making a business decision, the directors of a corporation acted on an informed basis in good faith and in the honest belief that the action was taken in the best interests of the company", even if they owed their jobs to the person being sued. A requirement to make a demand on the board will, however, be excused if it is shown that it would be entirely "futile", primarily because a majority of the board is alleged to have breached its duty. Otherwise it must be shown that all board members are in some very strong sense conflicted, but merely working with the accused directors, and the personal ties this potentially creates, is insufficient for some courts. This indicated a significant and controversial change in Delaware's judicial policy, that prevented claims against boards.

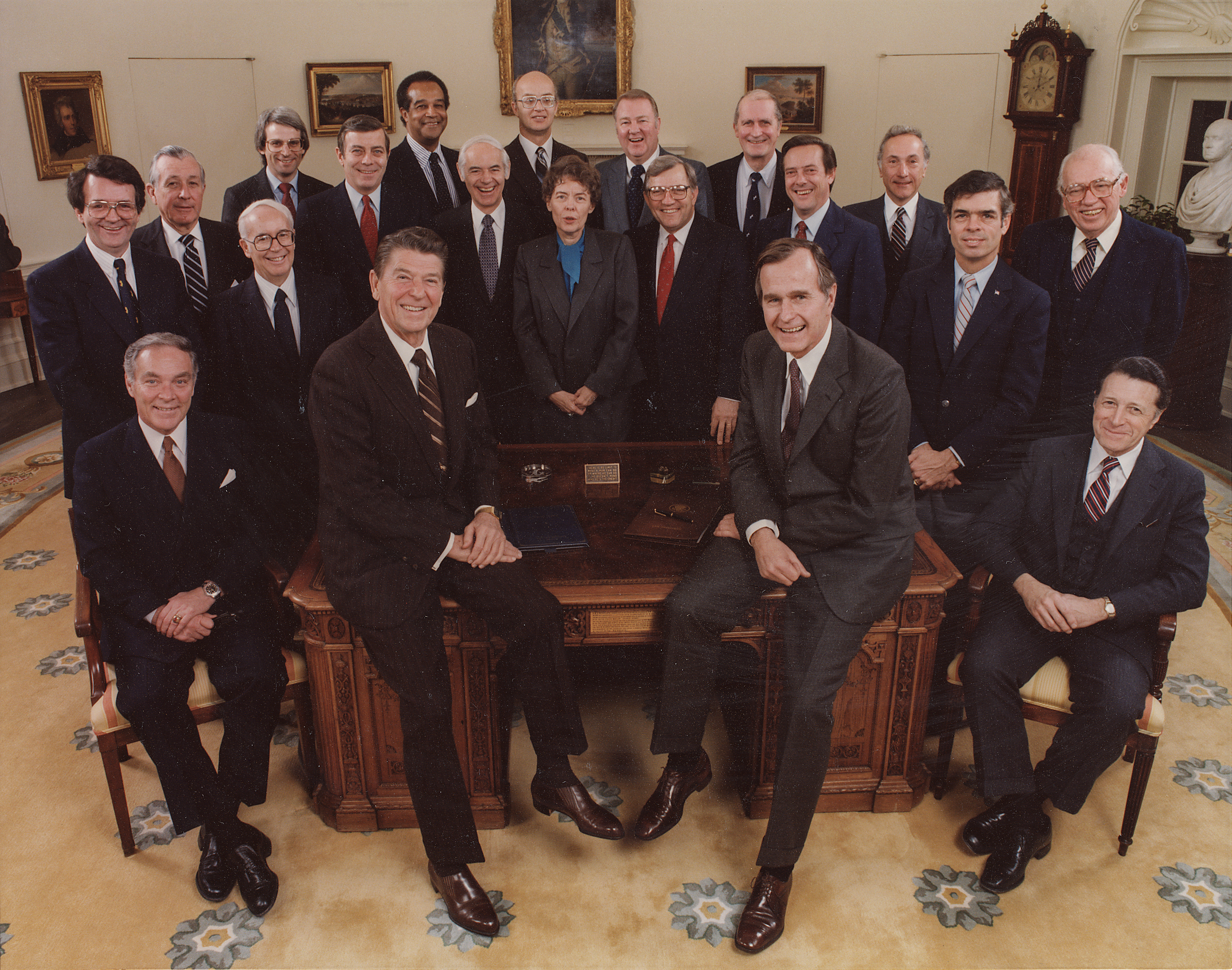
In 1981, in Zapata Corp v Maldonado the Delaware Supreme Court held that the board of Zapata Corp., founded by George H. W. Bush, could not be sued for breach of fiduciary duty. An "independent investigation committee" was competent to reject the demand for a derivative suit, despite being appointed by the board.

In some cases corporate boards attempted to establish "independent litigation committees" to evaluate whether a shareholder's demand to bring a suit was justified. This strategy was used to pre-empt criticism that the board was conflicted. The directors would appoint the members of the "independent committee", which would then typically deliberate and come to the conclusion that there was no good cause for bringing litigation. In Zapata Corp v Maldonado the Delaware Supreme Court held that if the committee acted in good faith and showed reasonable grounds for its conclusion, and the court could be "satisfied [about] other reasons relating to the process", the committee's decision to not allow a claim could not be overturned. Applying Connecticut law, the Second Circuit Federal Court of Appeals held in Joy v North that the court could substitute its judgment for the decisions of a supposedly independent committee, and the board, on the ground that there was scope for conflicting interests. Then, the substantive merits for bringing the derivative claim would be assessed. Winter J held overall that shareholders would have the burden "to demonstrate that the action is more likely than not to be against the interests of the corporation". This would entail a cost benefit analysis. On the benefit side would be "the likely recoverable damages discounted by the probability of a finding of liability", and the costs side would include "attorney's fees and other out-of-pocket expenses", "time spent by corporate personnel", "the impact of distraction of key personnel", and potential lost profits which may result from the publicity of a trial." If it is thought that the costs exceed the benefits, then the shareholders acquire the right to sue on the corporation's behalf. A substantive hearing on the merits about the alleged breach of director's duty may be heard. The tendency in Delaware, however, has remained to allow the board to play a role in restricting litigation, and therefore minimize the chances that it could be held accountable for basic breaches of duty.

== By state ==
State, territory or commonwealth	Required in corporation name	Authority
Alabama	"corporation", or "incorporated", or an abbreviation of one of such words, or if a banking corporation the words "bank", "banking", or "bankers"	§ 10-2B-4.01(a)(1) Code of Alabama 1975
Alaska	"corporation", "company", "incorporated", or "limited", or an abbreviation of one of these words; may not contain the word "city", "borough", or "village" or otherwise imply that the corporation is a municipality.	§ 10.06.105 (a) and (b), Alaska Corporations Code
Arizona	"association", "bank", "company", "corporation", "limited" or "incorporated" or an abbreviation of one of these words or the equivalent in a foreign language. Corporation may not use "bank", "deposit", "credit union", "trust" or "trust company" unless it also has a license to operate one. May not use "limited liability company" or "limited company" or the abbreviations "L.L.C.", "L.C.", "LLC", or "LC"	§ 10-401 Arizona Revised Statutes
Arkansas	"Corporation", "Company", or "Incorporated", "Limited" or shall contain an abbreviation of one of those words; but the name may not end with the word "Company" nor the abbreviation "Co." if the final word or abbreviation is immediately preceded by "and" or any symbol for "and"	§ 4-26-401 (1), Arkansas Code
California	"corporation", "incorporated" or "limited" or an abbreviation of one of such words is required and for a statutory close corporations for corporate provisions to apply. May not contain "bank", "trust", "trustee" or "credit union" unless approved by the Commissioner of Financial Institutions.	§ 202(a), California Corporations Code
Colorado	"corporation", "incorporated", "company", "limited", "corp.", "inc.", "co." or "ltd"; If the corporation is a professional corporation, it must contain the term or abbreviation "professional corporation", "p.c.", or "pc".	§ 7-90-601, Colorado Revised Statutes
Connecticut	"corporation", "incorporated", "company", "Societa per Azioni" or "limited", or the abbreviation "corp.", "inc.", "co.", "S.p.A." or "ltd."	§ 33-655 General Statutes of Connecticut
Delaware	"association", "company", "corporation", "club", "foundation", "fund", "incorporated", "institute", "society", "union", "syndicate", or "limited", (or abbreviations thereof, with or without punctuation), or words (or abbreviations thereof, with or without punctuation) of like import of foreign countries or jurisdictions (provided they are written in Roman characters or letters)	Title 8, § 102, Delaware Code
District of Columbia	"corporation", "company", "incorporated", or "limited", or shall contain an abbreviation of 1 of such words	§ 29–101.08 District of Columbia Official Code
Florida	"corporation", "company", or "incorporated" or the abbreviation "Corp.", "Inc.", or "Co.", or the designation "Corp", "Inc", or "Co"	§ 607.0401 Florida Statutes
Georgia	'corporation,' 'incorporated,' 'company,' or 'limited,' or the abbreviation 'corp.,' 'inc.,' 'co.,' or 'ltd.,' or words or abbreviations of like import in another language; must not be longer than 80 characters	O.C.G.A. § 14-2-401
Guam	"corporation", "incorporated", "company", or "limited", or the abbreviation "corp.", "inc.", "co.", or "ltd.", or words or abbreviations of like import in another language; if the word "company" or its abbreviation is used, it shall not be immediately preceded by the word "and" or an abbreviation or symbol representing the word "and."	Title 18, § 2110, Guam Code Annotated
Hawaii	"corporation", "incorporated", or "limited", or the abbreviation "corp.", "inc.", or "ltd."	§ 414-51 Hawaii Revised Statutes
Idaho	"corporation", "incorporated", "company", "limited", or the abbreviation "corp.", "inc.", "co.", or "ltd.", or words or abbreviations of like import in another language; provided however, that if the word "company" or its abbreviation is used it shall not be immediately preceded by the word "and" or by an abbreviation of or symbol representing the word "and"	§ 30-1-401 Idaho Statutes
Illinois	"corporation", "company", "incorporated", or "limited", or an abbreviation of one of such words	805 ILCS 5/4.05 Illinois Compiled Statutes
Indiana	"corporation", "incorporated", "company", or "limited", or the abbreviation "corp.", "inc.", "co.", or "ltd.", or words or abbreviations of like import in another language	§ 23-1-23-1 Indiana Code
Iowa	"corporation", "incorporated", "company", or "limited", or the abbreviation "corp.", "inc.", "co.", or "ltd.", or words or abbreviations of like import in another language	§ 490.401 Iowa Acts
Kansas	(except for banks) "association", "church", "college", "company", "corporation", "club", "foundation", "fund", "incorporated", "institute", "society", "union", "university", "syndicate" or "limited", or one of the abbreviations "co.", "corp.", "inc.", "ltd.", or words or abbreviations of like import in other languages if they are written in Roman characters or letters	§ 17-6002 Kansas Statutes
Kentucky	"corporation", "incorporated" or the abbreviation "Inc.", or the word "company" or the abbreviation "Co."; but if the word "company" or the abbreviation "Co." is used, it may not be immediately preceded by the word "and" or the abbreviation "&."	§ 273.177 Kentucky Revised Statutes
Louisiana	(except for railroad, telegraph and telephone corporations) "Corporation", "Incorporated" or "Limited", or the abbreviation of any of those words, or may contain instead the word "Company" or the abbreviation "Co." if the latter word or abbreviation is not immediately preceded by the word "and" or the symbol "&". No corporate name shall contain the phrase "doing business as" or the abbreviation "d/b/a". Only a bank or bank holding company is allowed to use any of "bank", "banker", "banking", "savings", "safe deposit", "trust", "trustee", "building and loan", "homestead", "credit union", "insurance", "casualty", "redevelopment corporation", or "electric cooperative".	§ 12:23 Louisiana Revised Statutes
Maine	words or abbreviations of words that describe the nature of the entity, including "professional association", "corporation", "company", "incorporated", "chartered", "limited", "limited partnership", "limited liability company", "professional limited liability company", "limited liability partnership", "registered limited liability partnership", "service corporation" or "professional corporation"; beginning July 1, 2007, may also include "limited liability limited partnership"	for business corporations: Title 13-C § 401 Maine Revised Statutes; for non-profit corporations: Title 13-B § 301-A Maine Revised Statutes
Maryland	For Corporations: "Company", if it is not preceded by the word "and" or a symbol for the word "and"; "Corporation", "Incorporated" or "Limited" or abbreviations; for Limited liability companies: "limited liability company", "L.L.C.", "LLC", "L.C.", or "LC"; for Limited liability partnerships: "limited liability partnership", "L.L.P." or "LLP"; for Limited partnerships: "limited partnership", "L.P.", or "LP"; for Limited liability limited partnerships: "limited liability limited partnership", "L.L.L.P.", or "LLLP"; for Professional corporations: "chartered", "chtd.", "professional association", "P.A.", "professional corporation", or "P.C."	Maryland Code – Corporations and Associations § 1–502
Massachusetts	any name which, in the judgment of the secretary, indicates that it is a corporation	General Laws Of Massachusetts – Chapter 155: Section 9
Michigan	"corporation", "company", "incorporated", or "limited" or shall contain 1 of the following abbreviations, corp., co., inc., or ltd.	Act 284 of 1972 Section 450.1211 Michigan Business Corporation Act
Minnesota	nonprofit corporations are not required to use any of these words; for business corporations, they must use "corporation", "incorporated", or "limited", or shall contain an abbreviation of one or more of these words, or the word "company" or the abbreviation "Co." if that word or abbreviation is not immediately preceded by the word "and" or the character "&"	Chapter 302A, Section 302A.115 Minnesota Statutes (for Business Corporations); Chapter 317A, Section 317A.115 Minnesota Statutes (for non-profit corporations)
Mississippi	"corporation", "incorporated", "company" or "limited", or the abbreviation "corp.", "inc.", "co." or "ltd." or words or abbreviations of like import in another language	§ 79-4-4.01 Mississippi code
Missouri	"corporation", "company", "incorporated", or "limited", or shall end with an abbreviation of one of said words	Chapter 351 Section 351.110 Missouri Revised Statutes
Montana	"corporation", "incorporated", "company", or "limited"; the abbreviation "corp.", "inc.", "co.", or "ltd."; or words or abbreviations of similar meaning in another language	35-1-308 Montana Code Annotated
Nebraska	corporation, incorporated, company, or limited, or the abbreviation corp., inc., co., or ltd., or words or abbreviations of like import in another language, except that a corporation organized to conduct a banking business under the Nebraska Banking Act may use a name which includes the word bank without using any such words or abbreviations	Section 21-2028 State of Nebraska Statutes
Nevada	No specific requirements stated except that a name appearing to be that of a natural person and containing a given name or initials must not be used as a corporate name except with an additional word or words such as "Incorporated", "Limited", "Inc.", "Ltd.", "Company", "Co.", "Corporation", "Corp.", or other word which identifies it as not being a natural person	78.035 Nevada Revised Statutes
New Hampshire	Contain the word "corporation", "incorporated", or "limited" or the abbreviation "corp.", "inc.", or "ltd."	New Hampshire Revised Statutes – Title XXVII; Section 293-A:4.01 for business corporations
New Jersey	Shall contain the word "corporation", "company", "incorporated", or shall contain an abbreviation of one of those words, or shall include the abbreviation Ltd.	New Jersey Statutes 14A:2-2
New Mexico	contain the separate word "corporation", "company", "incorporated" or "limited" or shall contain a separate abbreviation of one of these words	New Mexico Statutes Unannotated 53-11-7
New York	Shall contain the word "corporation", "incorporated" or "limited", or an abbreviation of one of such words; there is also a long list of words a business corporation is not allowed to use without additional approval from other agencies including "board of trade", "state police", "urban development", "chamber of commerce", "state trooper", "urban relocation", "community renewal", "tenant relocation", "acceptance", "endowment", "loan", "annuity", "fidelity", "mortgage", "assurance", "finance", "savings" and many others	New York State Consolidated Laws, Business Corporations Law § 301; Not-For-Profit Corporations Law, § 301
North Carolina	A corporation must contain the word "corporation", "incorporated", "company", or "limited", or the abbreviation "corp.", "inc.", "co.", or "ltd."; a limited liability company must contain the words "limited liability company" or the abbreviation "L.L.C." or "LLC", or the combination "ltd. liability co.", "limited liability co.", or "ltd. liability company"; a limited partnership that is not a limited liability limited partnership must contain the words "limited partnership", the abbreviation "L.P." or "LP", or the combination "ltd. partnership"; a limited liability limited partnershipmust contain the words "registered limited liability limited partnership" or "limited liability limited partnership" or the abbreviation "L.L.L.P.", "R.L.L.L.P.", "LLLP", or "RLLLP"; a registered limited liability partnership's name must contain the words "registered limited liability partnership" or "limited liability partnership" or the abbreviation "L.L.P.", "R.L.L.P.", "LLP" or "RLLP".	North Carolina General Statutes § 55D‑20
North Dakota	Must contain the word "company", "corporation", "incorporated", "limited", or an abbreviation of one or more of these words; may not contain the words "limited liability company", "limited partnership", "limited liability partnership", "limited liability limited partnership", or any abbreviation of these words.	North Dakota Century Code 10–19.1–13
Ohio	It shall end with or include the word or abbreviation "company", "co.", "corporation", "corp.", "incorporated", or "inc."	Ohio Revised Code § 1701.05
Oklahoma	The name of the corporation which shall contain one of the words "association", "company", "corporation", "club", "foundation", "fund", "incorporated", "institute", "society", "union", "syndicate", or "limited" or abbreviations thereof, with or without punctuation	Oklahoma Statutes § 18-1006
Oregon	For private corporations it shall contain one or more of the words "corporation", "incorporated", "company" or "limited" or an abbreviation of one or more of those words; shall not contain the word "cooperative". For non-profit corporations there is no specific requirement except the name cannot imply a purpose not dictated in its articles of incorporation and cannot contain the word "cooperative" or the phrase "limited partnership."	Oregon Revised Statutes60.094 for Private Corporations; ORS 65.094 for Non-Profit corporations
Pennsylvania	Corporation, Corp., Company, Co., Incorporated, Inc., Limited, Ltd., Association., Fund., Syndicate or words or abbreviations of like import in languages other than English	Pennsylvania Code, Chapter 19, § 23.3
Puerto Rico	Corporation, Corp. or Inc., or words or abbreviations of like import in other languages, provided they are written in roman letters or characters	Title 14, Subtitle 4, § 2602, Laws of Puerto Rico.
Rhode Island	"corporation", "company", "incorporated", or "limited", or an abbreviation of one of these words	Rhode Island General Laws § 7–1.2-401
South Carolina	"corporation", "incorporated", "company", or "limited", the abbreviation "corp.", "inc.", "co.", or "ltd.", or words or abbreviations of like import in another language	South Carolina Code of Laws Section 33-4-101
South Dakota	corporation, incorporated, company, or limited, or the abbreviation, corp., inc., co., or ltd., or terms or abbreviations of like import in another language	South Dakota Codified Laws 47-1A-401
Tennessee	"corporation", "incorporated", "company", or the abbreviation "corp.", "inc.", "co.", or words or abbreviations of like import in another language (provided they are written in Roman characters or letters); existing corporations which were formed using only "limited" or "ltd" are not required to change their name	§ 48-14-101 Tennessee Code
Texas	"company", "corporation", "incorporated", or "limited", or an abbreviation of one of those words.	Texas Business Organizations Code § 5.054
U.S. Virgin Islands	name shall be such as to indicate that it is a corporation as distinguished from a natural person or partnership.	Title Thirteen, § 2, Virgin Islands Code
Utah	"corporation", "incorporated", "company"; the abbreviation: "corp.", "inc." or "co." or words or abbreviations of like import to the words or abbreviations listed in another language; without the written consent of the United States Olympic Committee, may not contain the words "Olympic", "Olympiad", or "Citius Altius Fortius"; without the written consent of the Division of Consumer Protection may not contain the words "university", "college" or "institute"	§ 16-10a-401 Utah Code
Vermont	"corporation", "incorporated", "company", or "limited", or the abbreviation "corp.", "inc.", "co.", or "ltd.", or words or abbreviations of like import in another language; shall not have the word "cooperative" or any abbreviation thereof as part of its name unless the corporation is a worker cooperative corporation	Title 11A, § 4.01 Vermont Statutes
Virginia	"corporation", "incorporated", "company", or "limited", or the abbreviation "corp.", "inc.", "co.", or "ltd."	§ 13.1–630. Code of Virginia
Washington	"corporation", "incorporated", "company", or "limited", or the abbreviation "corp.", "inc.", "co.", or "ltd."; must not include "Bank", "banking", "banker", "trust", "cooperative", or any combination of the words "industrial" and "loan", or any combination of any two or more of the words "building", "savings", "loan", "home", "association", and "society"	§ 23B.04.010 Revised Code of Washington
West Virginia	"corporation", "incorporated", "company" or "limited", or the abbreviation "corp.", "inc.", "co." or "ltd.", or words or abbreviations of like import in another language	§ 31D-4-401 West Virginia Code
Wisconsin	"corporation", "incorporated", "company" or "limited" or the abbreviation "corp.", "inc.", "co." or "ltd." or words or abbreviations of like import in another language	§ 180.0401 Wisconsin Statutes (for Stock corporations) and § 181.0401 Wisconsin Statutes (for non-stock corporations)
Wyoming	Unclear; apparently any of "corporation", "company", "incorporated", and probably the usual abbreviations of "Corp." "Co." and "Inc."	§ 17-16-401 Wyoming Statutes

== Minority shareholder protections ==
- Ivanhoe Partners v Newmont Mining Corp., 535 A.2d 1334 (Del. 1987) a shareholder owning over 50% of shares is a controlling shareholder; but actual control may also be present through other mechanisms
- Citron v Fairchild Camera & Instrument Corp., 569 A.2d 53, 70 (Del. 1989) non-controlling shareholders do not owe duties to minority shareholders and may vote their shares for personal gain without concern
- In re Cysive, Inc. Shareholders Litigation 836 A.2d 531 (Del. 2003) Nelson Carbonell owned 35% of Cysive, Inc., a publicly traded company. His associates' holdings and options to buy more stock, however, actually meant he controlled around 40% of the votes. Chancellor held that "without having to attract much, if any, support from public stockholders" Carbonell could control the company. This was especially so since "100% turn-out is unlikely even in a contested election" and "40% block is very potent in view of that reality."
- Kahn v Lynch Communications Systems, Inc. 638 A.2d 1110 (Del. 1994) Alcatel held 43% of shares in Lynch. One of its nominees on the board told the others, "you must listen to us. We are 43% owner. You have to do what we tell you." The Delaware Supreme Court held that Alcatel did in fact dominate Lynch.
- Perlman v Feldmann, 219 F.2d 173 (2d Cir 1955), certiorari denied, 349 US 952 (1955) held it was foreseeable that a takeover bidder wished to divert a corporate advantage to itself, and so the selling shareholders were required to pay the premium they received to the corporation
- Jones v H.F. Ahmanson & Co. 1 Cal.3d 93, 460 P.2d 464 (1969) holders of 85% of comm shares in a savings and loan association, exchanged shares for shares of a new corporation and began to sell those to the public, meaning that the minority holding 15% had no market for the sale of their shares. Held, breach of fiduciary duty to the minority: "majority shareholders ... have a fiduciary responsibility to the minority and to the corporation to use their ability to control the corporation in a fair, just, and equitable manner."
- New York Business Corporation Law section 1104-a, the holders of 20 per cent of voting shares of a non-public corporation may request that the corporation be wound up on grounds of oppression.
- NY Bus Corp Law §1118 and Alaska Plastics, Inc. v. Coppock, 621 P.2d 270 (1980) the minority can sue to be bought out at a fair value, determined by arbitration or a court.
- Donahue v Rodd Electrotype Co of New England 367 Mass 578 (1975) majority shareholders cannot authorize a share purchase from one shareholder when the same opportunity is not offered to the minority.
- In re Judicial Dissolution of Kemp & Beatley, Inc 64 NY 2d 63 (1984) under a "just and equitable winding up" provision, (equivalent to IA 1986 s 212(1)(g)), it was construed that less drastic remedies were available to the court before winding up, and "oppression" was said to mean 'conduct that substantially defeats the 'reasonable expectations' held by minority shareholders in committing their capital to the particular enterprise. A shareholder who reasonably expected that ownership in the corporation would entitle him or her to a job, a share of corporate earnings, a place in corporate management, or some other form of security, would oppressed in a very real sense when others in the corporation seek to defeat those expectations and there exists no effective means of salvaging the investment.'
- Meiselman v Meiselman 309 NC 279 (1983) a shareholder's 'reasonable expectations' are to be determined by looking at the whole history of the participants' relationship. 'That history will include the 'reasonable expectations' created at the inception of the participants' relationship; those 'reasonable expectations' as altered over time; and the 'reasonable expectations' which develop as the participants engage in a course of dealing in conducting the affairs of the corporation.'

== Mergers and acquisitions ==
Applicable to Delaware corporations:

- DGCL §203
- Cheff v Mathes 199 A2d 548 (Del 1964)
- Weinberger v UOP Inc, 457 A2d 701, 703–04 (Del 1983) plaintiff must start by alleging the fiduciary stood to gain a material economic benefit. The burden then shifts to the defendant to show the fairness of the transaction. The court considers both the terms, and the process for the bargain, i.e. both a fair price, and fair dealing. However, if the director shows that full disclosure was made to either the disinterested directors or disinterested shareholders, then the burden remains on the plaintiff.
- Revlon Inc v MacAndrews & Forbes Holdings, Inc., 506 A.2d 173 (Del. 1985)
- Hanson Trust PLC v ML SCM Acquisition, Inc, 781 F.2d 264 (2d Cir 1986), asset lock up in contested takeover, violation of duty of care
- Unitrin Inc v American General Corp.
- Unocal Corp v Mesa Petroleum Co 493 A.2d 946 (Del. 1985)
- Moran v Household International Inc, 500 A.2d 1346 (Del. 1985)
- Lacos Land Co v Arden Group Inc, 517 A 2d 271 (Del Ch 1986)
- Paramount Communications Inc v QVC Network Inc, 637 A.2d 34 (Del. 1994)

== Corporate finance ==
- US Securities and Exchange Commission
- Dodd–Frank Wall Street Reform and Consumer Protection Act
- Stock certificate, Unissued stock and Treasury stock

=== Securities markets ===
- Securities Act of 1933
- Securities Exchange Act of 1934
- Williams Act
- SEC Rule 10b-5, unlawful to make 'any untrue statement of a material fact or to omit to state a material fact necessary in order to make the statements made ... not misleading.'
- Blue Chip Stamps v. Manor Drug Stores, 421 U.S. 723 (1975) only those suffering direct loss from the purchase or sale of stock have standing to sue under federal securities law.
- TSC Industries v Northway 426 U.S. 438 (1976) Burger CJ, material means 'a substantial likelihood that a reasonable shareholder would consider it important in deciding how to vote'.
- Chiarella v. United States, 445 U.S. 222 (1980) an employee of a printer that figured out upcoming company positions from his work was not liable for securities fraud.
- Basic v Levinson 485 U.S. 224 (1988) every affected investor can sue for personal loss, under a rebuttable presumption of reliance on the information (the 'fraud-on-the-market theory').
- United States v. O'Hagan 521 U.S. 642 (1997)
- Matrixx Initiatives, Inc. v. Siracusano 563 U.S. ___ (2011) company reports on products a basis for securities fraud action
- Merrill Lynch, Pierce, Fenner & Smith, Inc. v. Dabit, 547 U.S. 71 (2006) state law securities fraud class action claims were preempted by the Securities Litigation Uniform Standards Act of 1998
- Janus Capital Group, Inc. v. First Derivative Traders, 564 U.S. ___ (2011) 5 to 4 decision that related companies were not also liable under SEC Rule 10b-5

=== Investment businesses ===
- Investment Advisers Act of 1940
- Investment Company Act of 1940
- Credit Rating Agency Reform Act of 2006

=== Auditing ===
- Sarbanes–Oxley Act 2002 §404, listed corporations must document and disclose an enterprise-wide system of internal financial information. §301, CEO and CFO must personally certify integrity of annual financial statements.
- Schedule 13D, within 10 days anyone who acquires beneficial ownership of more than 5% of any class of publicly traded securities in a public company must tell the SEC.
- SEA 1934 §13 or 15(d) requires an annual report
- Form 10-K, the basic information required by the US Securities and Exchange Commission as an annual report
- Form 10-Q, required each quarter

=== Bankruptcy ===
- Chapter 11, Title 11, United States Code
- Claim in bankruptcy
- Taylor v Standard Gas and Electric Company
- Marrama v Citizens Bank of Massachusetts

== Theory ==
- Nexus of contracts and Concession theory
- WZ Ripley, Wall Street and Main Street (1927)
- AA Berle and GC Means, The Modern Corporation and Private Property (1932)
- LLSV and leximetrics
- Shareholder value, stakeholders and codetermination
- Charles A. Beard, "Corporations and Natural Rights", The Virginia Quarterly Review (1936)

== See also ==
- UK company law
- Connecticut General Life Insurance Company v. Johnson
- Dodd-Frank Wall Street Reform and Consumer Protection Act 2010
- Swiss referendum "against corporate Rip-offs" of 2013
- List of company registers
