= In re Walt Disney Co. Derivative Litigation =

In re Walt Disney Derivative Litigation
- Court: Delaware Chancery Court
- Decided: August 9, 2005
- Citation: 907 A 2d 693 (2005)

Case history
- Prior action: 825 A 2d 275 (Del. Ch. 2003)

Keywords
- Directors' duties, duty of care

In re: the Walt Disney Company Derivative Litigation
- Court: Supreme Court of Delaware
- Decided: June 8, 2006
- Docket nos.: No. 411, 2005
- Citation: 906 A.2d 27 (Del. 2006)

Holding
- Affirmed: the Court of Chancery made no errors of fact or law in finding that the defendants did not commit waste or breach fiduciary duties.

Court membership
- Chief judge: Myron T. Steele
- Associate judges: Randy J. Holland, Carolyn Berger, Jack B. Jacobs, Henry du Pont Ridgely

In re Walt Disney Derivative Litigation, 907 A 2d 693 (2005) is a U.S. corporate law case concerning the scope of the duty of care under Delaware law. Disney is the leading case on executive compensation.

== Background ==
=== The factual history ===
The Walt Disney Company appointed Michael Ovitz as executive president and director in 1995. He had founded Creative Artists Agency, a premier Hollywood talent finder. He had an income of $20m. Michael Eisner, the chairman, wanted him to join Disney in 1995, and negotiated with him on compensation, led by Disney compensation committee chair Irwin Russell. The other members of the committee and the board were not told until the negotiations were well underway.

Ovitz insisted on having his pay go up if things went well, and having an exit package in case things did not. It totaled about $24 million a year. Irwin Russell cautioned that the pay was significantly above normal levels and 'will raise very strong criticism'. Graef Crystal, a compensation expert warned that Ovitz was getting "low risk and high return" but the report was not approved by the whole board or the committee.

On 14 August 1995 Eisner released to the press the appointment, before the compensation committee had formally met to discuss it. Russell, Raymond Watson, Sidney Poitier and Ignacio E. Lozano, Jr. met on 26 September for an hour. They discussed four other major items and the consultant, Crystal, was not invited. Once he began working at Disney, Ovitz's relationships with others quickly became bitter; other Disney executives would accuse him of arrogance and of wasting money, and even Eisner, who wanted to hire him in the first place, would refer to him in company memos as a "psychopath" with a "character problem." Within a year Ovitz lost Eisner's confidence and terminated his contract.

Ovitz walked away with $140m for a year's work. Shareholders brought a derivative suit shortly after, in January 1997. Two decisions were at issue: 1) the hiring of Ovitz, and 2) the firing of Ovitz.

=== Context ===
The 1990s were good years for Disney as a business. The case would come to trial in 2004, however, and many in the business world were still shaken by the 2001 Enron scandal and the 2002 WorldCom scandal. Because of these scandals, there was concern among many that major corporations did not face enough pressure to act responsibly, and enormous executive compensation packages, such as the one paid to Ovitz, were a particular area of concern.

== Judgment of the Court of Chancery ==
Chancellor Chandler noted that the case was about the fiduciary duties that the defendants had toward shareholders, and that the business judgment rule granted a presumption (that the plaintiffs would have to overcome) that decisions like the hiring and firing of Ovitz did not breach any duties. The plaintiffs essentially needed to show that Disney had acted with gross negligence or bad faith, and the Court of Chancery ruled that they had not done so. Chancellor Chandler came to this conclusion despite a number of problems with the conduct of the defendants:

As I will explain in painful detail hereafter, there are many aspects of defendants' conduct that fell significantly short of the best practices of ideal corporate governance... What follows is my judgment on whether each director of The Walt Disney Company fulfilled his or her obligation to act in good faith and with honesty of purpose under the unusual facts of this case.

— Chancellor William Chandler, In re Walt Disney Co. Derivative Litigation, 907 A. 2d 693 at 697, 699

After reviewing what each member of the board of directors and all the relevant executives had done, Court of Chancery ruled that:

1. Michael Ovitz did not breach his duty of loyalty.
2. The defendants did not commit waste.
3. Ovitz's hiring was neither grossly negligent nor in bad faith.
4. Ovitz's firing was neither grossly negligent nor in bad faith.

Chandler was critical of the conduct of many at Disney, including CEO Michael Eisner, who he said had 'enthroned himself as the omnipotent and infallible monarch of his personal Magic Kingdom'. Under the standards of business law, however, they had acted in good faith, with a subjective belief that they were right and that they were acting in the company's best interests.

As points of comparison, Chandler said that in Smith v. Van Gorkom (a case where a company was found liable for breaching fiduciary duties) the sale for $735m of TransUnion was much more significant to the company than Ovitz's hiring here, and TransUnion had absolutely no documentation before it when it considered the merger agreement. The compensation committee here was provided with a term sheet for all the key points of the employment contract. TransUnion's senior management completely opposed the merger, but here everyone saw hiring Ovitz as a 'boon for the Company'.

== Appeal to the Supreme Court of Delaware ==
The plaintiffs appealed, but the Supreme Court of Delaware affirmed the decision of the Court of Chancery. Justice Jacobs of the Delaware Supreme Court wrote the opinion for the court, and there were no dissents. Jacobs grouped the various allegations on appeal into two categories: claims against Ovitz and claims against the Disney defendants. As this was an appeal, the Supreme Court would accept the factual findings of the Court of Chancery unless they were "clearly wrong", and it would review questions of law de novo. In general, the Court found nothing wrong with the lower court's analysis or findings of fact.

With respect to one argument in particular, that Disney's board failed to exercise due care in approving Ovitz's compensation, the Court reiterated that companies did not have to adhere to "best practices" in all cases:

In our view, a helpful approach is to compare what actually happened here to what would have occurred had the committee followed a "best practices" (or "best case") scenario, from a process standpoint. In a "best case" scenario, all committee members would have received, before or at the committee's first meeting on September 26, 1995, a spreadsheet or similar document prepared by (or with the assistance of) a compensation expert (in this case, Graef Crystal). Making different, alternative assumptions, the spreadsheet would disclose the amounts that Ovitz could receive under the OEA [Ovitz's employment agreement] in each circumstance that might foreseeably arise. One variable in that matrix of possibilities would be the cost to Disney of a non-fault termination for each of the five years of the initial term of the OEA. The contents of the spreadsheet would be explained to the committee members, either by the expert who prepared it or by a fellow committee member similarly knowledgeable about the subject. That spreadsheet, which ultimately would become an exhibit to the minutes of the compensation committee meeting, would form the basis of the committee's deliberations and decision.

Had that scenario been followed, there would be no dispute (and no basis for litigation)...

The compensation committee members derived their information about the potential magnitude of an NFT [non-fault termination] payout from two sources. The first was the value of the "benchmark" options previously granted to Eisner and Wells and the valuations by Watson of the proposed Ovitz options. Ovitz's options were set at 75% of parity with the options previously granted to Eisner and to Frank Wells...

The committee's second source of information was the amount of "downside protection" that Ovitz was demanding. Ovitz required financial protection from the risk of leaving a very lucrative and secure position at CAA, of which he was a controlling partner, to join a publicly held corporation to which Ovitz was a stranger, and that had a very different culture and an environment which prevented him from completely controlling his destiny. The committee members knew that by leaving CAA and coming to Disney, Ovitz would be sacrificing "booked" CAA commissions of $150 to $200 million...

It is on this record that the Chancellor found that the compensation committee was informed of the material facts relating to an NFT payout.

— Justice Jacobs, In re Walt Disney Co. Derivative Litigation, 906 A. 2d 27, 56-59

== See also ==
- United States corporate law
- Re Barings plc (No 5) [1999] 1 BCLC 433
- Say on pay
