= Graham v. Allis-Chalmers Mfg. Co. =

1963 case in US corporate law

Graham v. Allis-Chalmers
- Court: Delaware Supreme Court
- Full case name: Graham v. Allis-Chalmers Mfg. Co.
- Decided: January 24, 1963

Court membership
- Judge sitting: Justice Daniel Walcott

Graham v. Allis-Chalmers Mgf. Co., 188 A.2d 125 (Del. 1963) is a derivative action that came before the Delaware Supreme Court. Scholars have described it is an important case in United States corporate law as the first Delaware case to discuss a director's duty of care in the oversight context. The court addressed the scope of directors' duties to seek out and stop corporate activity that violates positive law. Commentators describe the case as establishing the "red flags" oversight standard in the duty of care and duty of loyalty line of cases in which the Board must take steps to promptly end illegal activity and prevent its recurrence once it became evident that there were reasonable grounds for suspicion, but not before then.

However, in a later Delaware Court of Chancery opinion, In re Caremark International Inc. Derivative Litigation, 698 A.2d 959 (Del. Ch. 1996), Chancellor Allen expanded upon the Allis-Chalmers framework, suggesting that directors have an affirmative duty to assure that reporting systems are in place. The Caremark opinion recognized that Allis-Chalmers actually disincentivized monitoring by only making directors liable once they learn of a problem which discouraged them from finding them in the first place. Caremark later became enshrined in Delaware law when the Delaware Supreme Court endorsed and clarified Caremark duties in Stone v. Ritter, 911 A.2d 362 (Del. 2006).

== Facts ==
Four non-director employees within Allis-Chalmers pled guilty to indictments that charged violations of the Federal Antitrust laws. According to the hearings and depositions, none of the directors had any actual knowledge of the price fixing and bid rigging schemes nor any actual knowledge of facts that should have put them on notice that employees were engaging in illegal activities. The illegal activity started in 1956 and the directors receive the first actual knowledge of the violations in 1959. An officer and director investigated but unearthed nothing. Allis-Chalmers' Legal Division investigated further and subpoenaed employees to tell the truth after suspecting the illegal activity. In 1960, the Board directed a statement relating to antitrust problems to be issued and the Legal Division had a series of meetings with all employees in possible areas of antitrust activity.

== Plaintiffs' arguments ==
Plaintiffs argued that despite directors having no actual knowledge of the antitrust violations, the Allis-Chalmers board should have put a watchfulness system into effect which would have brought such misconduct to their attention to bring it to an end as soon as possible. They also point to two FTC decrees of 1937 as warning of past antitrust activities on the part of employees.

== Judgment ==
In affirming the Vice Chancellor's ruling, the Delaware Supreme Court held that the Board must take steps to promptly end illegal activity and prevent its recurrence once it became evident that there were reasonable grounds for suspicion, but there is no duty before then.

- Key language: "Plaintiffs say these steps should have been taken long before, even in the absence of suspicion, but we think not, for we know of no rule of law which requires a corporate director to assume, with no justification whatsoever, that all corporate employees are incipient law violators who, but for a tight check-rein, will give free vent to their unlawful propensities." 188 A.2d 125, 130–31 (Del. 1963)

== Reasoning ==
Part of their reasoning was the defendant directors and now officers of the company were employed in such subordinate roles or entirely unaffiliated with Allis-Chalmers in 1937 that the 1937 FTC warnings gave the current board no actual notice of the possibility of future illegal price fixing.

The Delaware Supreme Court also relied on Briggs v. Spaulding, 141 U.S. 132 (1891) which expressly rejects the plaintiffs argument and instead expressed that directors are entitled to rely on the honesty and integrity of their subordinates until something occurs to put them on suspicion that something is wrong.

The court also referenced the sheer size of Allis-Chalmers' operations which employed more than 30,000 people and extended over a large geographical area. In terms of balancing monitoring costs and the efficiencies of the corporate form's allowance for delegation to employees and managers, the court believes it impractical and too costly to have constant monitoring.

Finally, there was also no allegation that the directors were reckless or willfully ignored any danger signs of employee wrongdoing. In fact, as soon as Allis-Chalmers became aware of the issue, they took several steps to investigate and prevent the situation going forward.

== Aftermath and legacy ==
Graham v. Allis-Chalmers has been recognized by corporate law scholars as an early and influential articulation of the "red flags" standard for board oversight liability. According to commentators, the decision established the principle that directors are generally entitled to rely on management and have no affirmative duty to seek out wrongdoing absent warning signs suggesting misconduct.

The scope of directors' oversight duties evolved significantly in later Delaware decisions. In Caremark, the Delaware Court of Chancery reframed the oversight inquiry and suggested that boards owe an affirmative duty to implement reasonable reporting and compliance systems. The Delaware Supreme Court later endorsed and clarified the Caremark framework in Stone v. Ritter, which described Allis-Chalmers as part of the doctrinal foundation for oversight liability.

More recent Delaware cases–including In Re Citigroup Inc Shareholder Derivative Litigation (2009), Marchand v. Barnhill (2019), In Re Clovis Oncology (2019), In Re Boeing Co. Derivative Litigation (2021), In Re McDonalds Corporation Stockholder Derivative Litigation (2023), and Teamsters Local 443 Health Services & Insurance Plan v. Chou (2023) – have further developed the duty of oversight in the context of monitoring "mission critical" risks and corporate culture failures. These decisions continue to cite Allis-Chalmers as an early example of the limits of director liability in the absence of red flags and as a point of contrast to the modern Caremark standard.
