= In re Citigroup Inc. Shareholder Derivative Litigation =

In re Citigroup Inc Shareholder Derivative Litigation
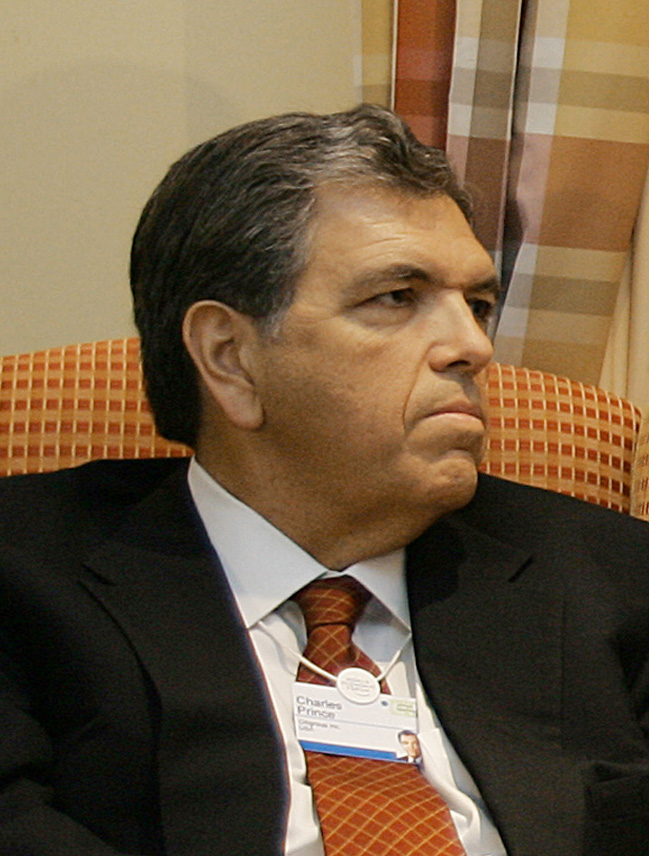
- Chuck Prince, former Citigroup CEO
- Court: Delaware Chancery Court
- Citation: 964 A 2d 106 (Del Ch 2009)

Keywords
- Directors' duties

In re Citigroup Inc Shareholder Derivative Litigation, 964 A 2d 106 (Del Ch 2009) is a US corporate law case, concerning the standard under Delaware law for the duty of loyalty among directors' duties.

== Facts ==
Citigroup had losses from subprime lending due to the subprime mortgage crisis and the 2008 financial crisis. Former CEO Chuck Prince had said "as long as the music is still playing you have to get up and dance". Shareholders of Citigroup claimed that the directors had breached their duty of care by (1) failing to monitor the bank's risk profile and (2) failing to control risk taking by the bank. They alleged there were "red flags" from public statements like Paul Krugman in the NY Times (27 May 2005) saying there were "feverish stages of a speculative bubble" and Ameriquest Mortgage (May 2006) closing 229 offices and dismissing 3800 employees.

== Judgment ==
Chancellor Chandler held that there was no liability without bad faith. He repeated the In re Caremark International Inc. Derivative Litigation standard of 'utter failure' establishing a lack of good faith, which was approved further in Stone v. Ritter. As he said, the business judgment rule,

prevents judicial second guessing of the decision if the directors employed a rational process and considered all material information reasonably available – a standard measured by concepts of gross negligence...

...indeed, a showing of bad faith is a necessary condition to director oversight liability...

[...]

In contrast, plaintiffs' Caremark claims are based on defendants' alleged failure to properly monitor Citigroup's business risk, specifically its exposure to the subprime mortgage market....

[The claim is...] that Citigroup suffered large losses and that there were certain warning signs that could or should have put defendants on notice of the business risks related to Citigroup's investments in subprime assets. Plaintiffs then conclude that because defendants failed to prevent the Company's losses associated with certain business risks, they must have consciously ignored these warning signs or knowingly failed to monitor the Company's risk in accordance with their fiduciary duties. Such conclusory allegations, however, are not sufficient...

[...]

Plaintiffs do not contest that Citigroup had procedures and controls in place that were designed to monitor risk... the ARM Committee met eleven times in 2006 and twelve times in 2007.'

[...]

...plaintiffs would ultimately have to prove bad faith conduct by the director defendants...

[...]

That the director defendants knew of signs of a deterioration in the subprime mortgage market, or even signs suggesting that conditions could decline further, is not sufficient to show that the directors were or should have been aware of any wrongdoing at the Company or were consciously disregarding a duty somehow to prevent Citigroup from suffering losses...

[...]

it is tempting in a case with such staggering losses for one to think that they could have made the 'right' decision if they had been in the directors' position. This temptation, however, is one of the reasons for the presumption against an objective review of business decisions by judges, a presumption that is no less applicable when the losses to the Company are large.

== See also ==
- United States corporate law
- Re Barings plc (No 5) [1999] 1 BCLC 433, [2000] 1 BCLC 523
