= Foster Bryant Surveying Ltd v Bryant =

2007 company law case in the United Kingdom

- Court: Court of Appeal of England and Wales
- Full case name: Foster Bryant Surveying Limited v (1) Bryant (2) Savernake Property Consultants Limited
- Decided: March 13, 2007
- Citation: [2007] EWCA Civ 200

Court membership
- Judges sitting: Buxton LJ, Rix LJ, Moses LJ

Foster Bryant Surveying Ltd v Bryant [2007] EWCA Civ 200 is a 2007 UK company law case, concerning the fiduciary duty of directors to avoid conflicts of interest. The timing of the case followed some considerable unrest in the courts about the strictness of the law relating to taking corporate opportunities.

== Facts ==
Mr Foster and Mr Bryant were directors of the plaintiff, a surveying company. Most of their work came from a company called Alliance. Mrs Bryant also worked for the company, until Mr Foster said she was going to be made redundant. Unsurprisingly, this made Mr Bryant unhappy. He resigned.

Alliance still wanted both of them to keep working. It said that Mr Bryant should still give his services. Mr Foster argued that Mr Bryant's services should be contracted out through their company still, not a separate one. But he lost the argument. Mr Bryant, fully funded by Alliance, set up a new company. However this was all done a few days before the resignation had actually taken effect.

In the light of the preceding events, the company sued Mr Bryant, alleging that he had breached his fiduciary duty during the period between resigning, and his resignation taking contractual effect. FBS Ltd (i.e. Mr Foster) sued Mr Bryant for breach of his fiduciary duty of loyalty, and the diversion of corporate opportunities to himself.

== Judgment ==
Upholding the High Court ruling, the Court of Appeal found there was no breach of fiduciary duty in this case.

Rix LJ delivered the principal judgment, starting with the Canadian Supreme Court case, Canadian Aero Service Ltd v O'Malley. Here, defendant directors had resigned so that they could take the benefits for themselves of a project that they had been negotiating on behalf of the company. Laskin J had held that the defendants were "faithless fiduciaries", their duties survived resignation, their resignation had been influenced by wanting to get the opportunity, and that they were in breach of trust. However, he stressed that he was "not to be taken as laying down any rule of liability to be read as if it were a statute", but rather the standards of loyalty, good faith and the no-conflict rule should be looked at with reference to all the circumstances.

"Among them are the factor of position or office held, the nature of the corporate opportunity, its ripeness, its specificness [sic] and the director's or managerial officer's relation to it, the amount of knowledge possessed, the circumstances in which it was obtained and whether it was special or, indeed even private, the factor of time in the continuation of fiduciary duty where the alleged breach occurs after termination of the relationship with the company, and the circumstances under which the relationship was terminated, that is whether by retirement or resignation or discharge."

Rix LJ felt that Laskin J was right to see the strict equitable rule as nevertheless merit based. He also referred to three further cases, in the spirit of an article by Prof. John Lowry from 2000, which supported a more 'nuanced' approach. First, in Island Export Finance v Umunna, Hutchinson J, who relied extensively on Laskin J's judgment, took the view that the proposition that liability arises from the mere fact that the defendant's position as a director led him to a post-resignation opportunity, was too widely stated. In Balston Ltd v Headlines Filters Ltd Falconer J followed the views expressed by Hutchinson J, stating,

"In my judgment an intention by a director of a company to set up business in competition with the company after his directorship has ceased is not to be regarded as a conflicting interest within the context of the principle, having regard to the rules of public policy as to restraint of trade, nor is the taking of any preliminary steps to investigate or forward that intention so long as there is no actual competitive activity, such as, for instance, competitive tendering or actual trading, while he remains a director."

Thirdly, in Framlington Group Plc v Anderson, Blackburne J held that in the absence of special circumstances, like a prohibition in a service contract, a director commits no breach of duty merely because, while a director, he takes...

"...steps so that, on ceasing to be a director... he can immediately set up business in competition with that company or join a competitor of it. Nor is he obliged to disclose to that company that he is taking those steps."

Rix LJ draws the conclusion from these three cases, and the authorities cited by the trial judges in their judgments, that although the general equitable principle which places an embargo on conflicts of duty is beyond doubt, the extent of a director's duty may depend upon the particular circumstances of the case. Furthermore, drawing on Lawrence Collins J's reasoning in CMS Dolphin Ltd v Simonet, where the claimant company successfully claimed that Simonet, its former managing director, was in breach of fiduciary duty by diverting a maturing business opportunity to a new company established by him following his resignation, Rix LJ stressed that there should be "some relevant connection or link between the resignation and the obtaining of the business". In so doing, he placed emphasis upon the need to demonstrate both lack of good faith with which the future exploitation was planned while still a director, and the need to show that the resignation was an integral part of the dishonest plan. Thus, in cases where liability for post-resignation breach of duty had been found, there was a causal connection between the resignation and the subsequent diversion of the opportunity to the director's new enterprise. That said, Rix LJ recognised the difficulty of accurately summarising the circumstances in which retiring directors may or may not be held to have breached their fiduciary duties given that the issue is "fact sensitive". It was clear, however, that the defendant's resignation was innocent of any disloyalty or conflict of interest.

Moses LJ, while recognising that the resolution of issues of breach of fiduciary duty are fact specific, felt "almost" nostalgic for the days when there were inflexible rules of equity which were inexorably enforced by judges "who would have shuddered at the reiteration of the noun-adjective". Buxton LJ, also endorsing Rix LJ's judgment, stressed that the facts were particularly unusual and the Court was right to adopt a realistic approach to the alleged breach of duty. It is, he said,

"unreal to contend that, faced with Mrs Watts proposal, [the defendant] should have gone out of his way to seek to deter her from it."

== Case usage ==
In a 2009 case, G Attwood Holdings v Woodward, the decision in Bryant was referred to, noting that Bryant was one of "the (relatively rare) occasions" when the Court of Appeal had considered the law on directors' duties.

== See also ==
- Guth v Loft, a Delaware decision which deviated from the strict approach.
- Keech v Sandford, the rule of equity that has been the bedrock of fiduciary duties for 280 years.
