= CMS Dolphin Ltd v Simonet =

2001 High Court of Justice case

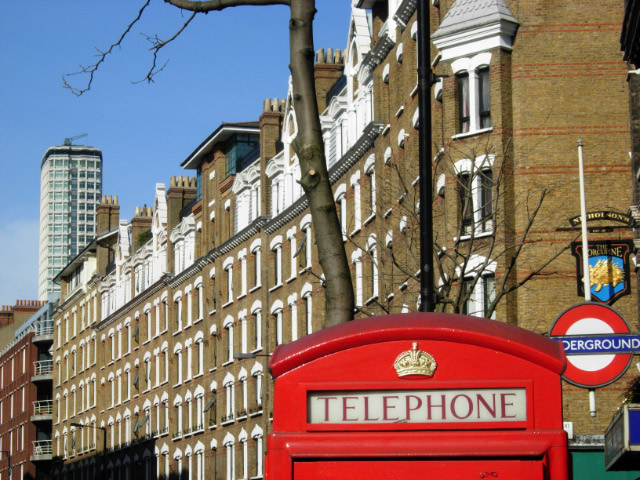
- Charing Cross Rd, home of CMS Dolphin Ltd
- Court: High Court
- Decided: 23 May 2001
- Citations: [2001] EWHC (Ch) 4159, [2001] 2 BCLC 704

Case opinions
- Lawrence Collins J

Keywords
- Duty of loyalty, resigning

CMS Dolphin Ltd v Simonet [2001] EWHC Ch 415 is a UK company law case concerning directors' duties.

Mr Simonet resigned from his position as managing director of CMS Dolphin Ltd (a small advertising company on Charing Cross Road) and he set up a new company. CMS's staff followed and so did the major clients. CMS sued Simonet for the profits he made, alleging that he had breached his duty of loyalty to the company. Simonet contended that he owed no duty because he had left the company.

== Judgment ==
Lawrence Collins, J, held that Simonet resigned without giving proper notice, and so he was in breach of contract.

He had made no proper disclosure and had misused confidential information. The maturing business opportunities were the company's property, ‘where he knowingly had a conflict of interest, and exploited it by resigning from the company’. Resignation was not a fiduciary power in itself, and no obligations continued after the end of the relationship.

3 In many cases an account of profits would be a more advantageous remedy than equitable compensation since the actual profits obtained by a director might be higher than the damages for the loss of opportunity suffered by the company, particularly where the company had little or no prospect of obtaining the benefit of the opportunity (Industrial Development Consultants Ltd v Cooley [1972] 1 WLR 443; Canadian Aero Service Ltd v O'Malley (1973) 40 DLR (3rd) 371). Where, as here, the business was not restricted exclusively to the performance of contracts which were obtained from CMSD, the fiduciary should be accountable for the profits properly attributable to the breach of fiduciary duty, taking into account the expenses connected with those profits and a reasonable allowance for overheads (but not necessarily salary for the wrongdoer), together with a sum to take account of other benefits derived from those contracts, e.g. other contracts might not have been won, or profits made on them, without (for example) the opportunity or cash-flow benefit which flowed from the contracts unlawfully obtained. There must, however, be some reasonable connection between the breach of duty and the profits for which the fiduciary was accountable. 4 Where a director put contracts of a company into a partnership he was fully accountable even if his partners were entitled to part of the profit and were ignorant of his breach of fiduciary duty (Imperial Mercantile Credit Association v Coleman (1873) LR 6 HL 189). If the business was put into a company established by a director who had wrongfully taken advantage of the corporate opportunity, then both director and the new company were liable to account for profits (Cook v Deeks [1916] 1 AC 554; Canadian Aero Service Ltd v O'Malley (supra)). It was not necessary, in order to establish liability, to resort to piercing or lifting the corporate veil since a director was equally liable with the corporate vehicle formed by him to take unlawful advantage of the business opportunities as they jointly participated in a breach of trust. It did not make any difference whether the business was taken up by a corporate vehicle directly or was first taken up by a director and then transferred to a company.

Three months' notice is probably sufficient.

== See also ==
- UK company law
