= Benihana of Tokyo, Inc. v. Benihana, Inc. =

2006 Delaware Supreme Court case

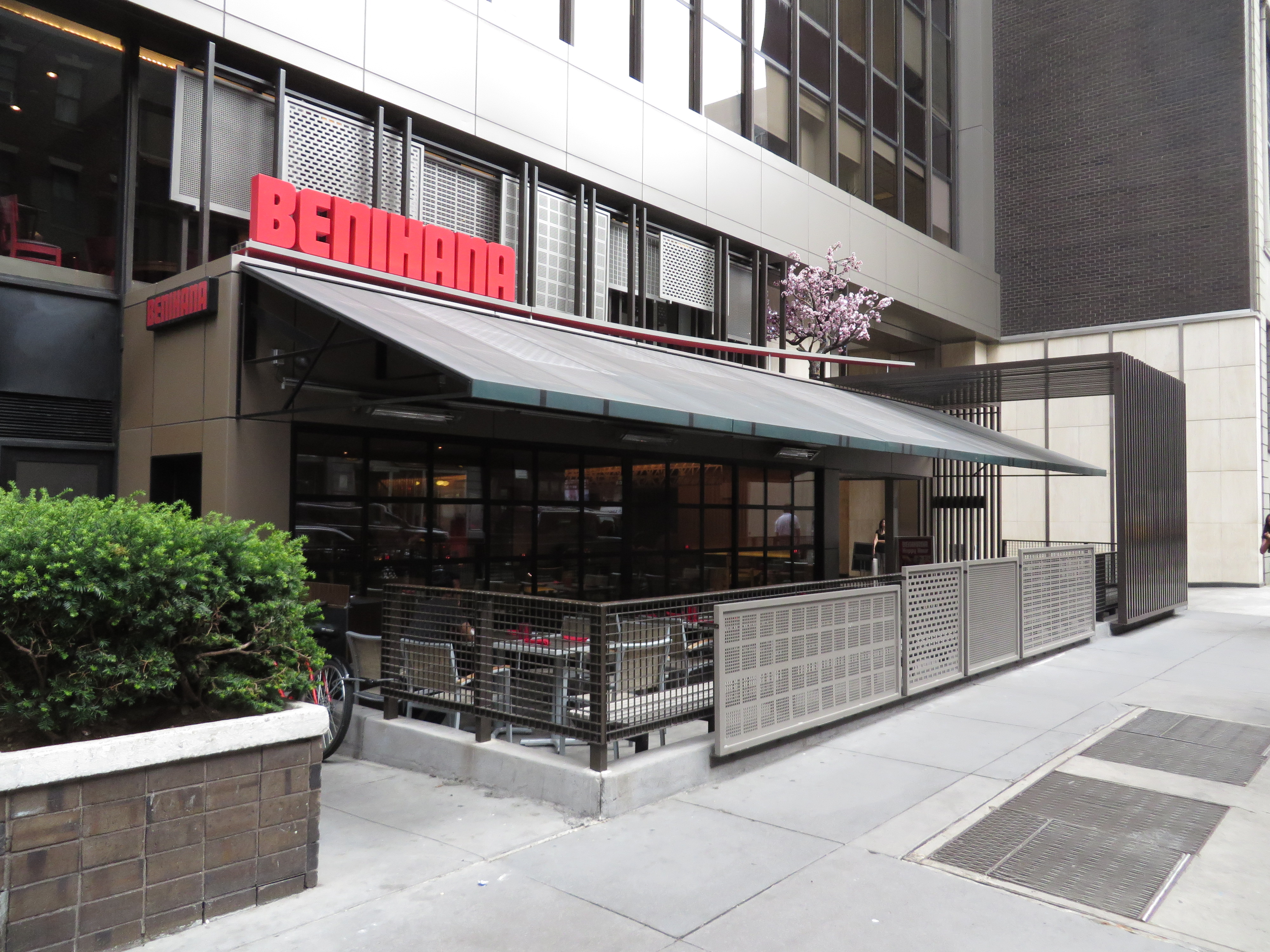
- Court: Delaware Supreme Court
- Citation: 906 A.2d 114 (Del. 2006)

Keywords
- Directors' duties, derivative suit

Benihana of Tokyo, Inc. v. Benihana, Inc., 906 A.2d 114 (Del. 2006) was a case in the Delaware Supreme Court between Benihana of Tokyo, Inc., and its subsidiary Benihana, Inc., that concerned the duty of loyalty between a company and its directors. The court held that a Board's approval of an issuance and purchase of preferred stock was a valid exercise of its business judgment under Delaware law.

== Facts ==
Benihana of Tokyo owned approximately 51% of Benihana, Inc. The latter was having financial difficulties and its directors approved an issuance of $20 million of preferred stock. A company called BFC bought the stock in a deal that was negotiated by a Benihana director. The same Benihana director was also a principal owner of BFC. After the directors approved the stock sale, Benihana of Tokyo disagreed with the sale and purchase and filed a derivative lawsuit against the directors.

=== Procedural facts ===
Benihana of Tokyo sued Benihana, arguing the directors had breached their fiduciary duty by allowing a director to negotiate the deal, when he had an interest acting for both the buying and selling parties. The trial court held for the directors, stating that the board knew that the director was a principal of BFC, but that the board was not informed that the director had negotiated the deal on behalf of BFC. The trial court also found that the decision was within the bounds of the business judgment rule.

=== Issue ===
There were two prominent issues in this case. The first was whether the directors breached their fiduciary duties in allowing a director with conflicting interests to be involved in the deal. The second was whether there was a safe harbor in the business

== Judgment ==
The appellate court affirmed the lower court's decisions. The appellate court applied Delaware law, which provided safe harbor for an interested transaction. The law states, "the material facts as to the director's relationship or interest and as to the contract or transaction are disclosed or are known to the board of directors, and the board in good faith authorizes the contract or transaction by an affirmative vote of the majority of the disinterested directors." Del. Code Section 144(a)(1). Benihana of Tokyo argued that this law was not applicable because the directors did not know that the director negotiated the deal.

Ultimately, the appellate court found that because the directors spent significant time on the process of making their decision, and because the transaction was a fair deal that was approved by a majority of disinterested directors, it was covered by the business judgment rule.

== See also ==
- United States corporate law
