= Duty of loyalty =

Duty to act in best interests

The duty of loyalty is often called the cardinal principle of fiduciary relationships, but is particularly strict in the law of trusts. In that context, the term refers to a trustee's duty to administer the trust solely in the interest of the beneficiaries, and following the terms of the trust. It generally prohibits a trustee from engaging in transactions that might involve self-dealing or even an appearance of conflict of interest. Furthermore, it requires a fiduciary to deal with transparency regarding material facts known to them in interactions with beneficiaries.

Duty of loyalty in corporation law to describe a fiduciary's "conflicts of interest and requires fiduciaries to put the corporation's interests ahead of their own." "Corporate fiduciaries breach their duty of loyalty when they divert corporate assets, opportunities, or information for personal gain."

It is generally acceptable if a company director makes a decision for the corporation that profits both the director and the corporation, but the duty of loyalty is breached when the director puts his or her interest ahead of that of the corporation.

== Conditions of self-dealing transaction ==
- Flagrant Diversion: corporate official stealing tangible corporate assets - "a plain breach of the fiduciary's duty of loyalty since the diversion was unauthorized and the corporation received no benefit in the transaction."
- Self-Dealing: A key player and the corporation are on opposite sides of the transaction or the key player has helped influence the corporation's decisions to enter the transaction. "When a fiduciary enters into a transaction with the corporation on unfair terms, the effect is the same as if he had appropriated the difference between the transaction's fair value and the transaction's price."
- Executive Compensation
- Usurping Corporate Opportunity
- Disclosure to Shareholders
- Trading on Inside Information
- Selling out
- Entrenchment
- The key player's personal financial interest are at least potentially in conflict with the financial interests of the corporation.

== Legally Defining the Corporation's Interests ==
The Duty of Loyalty mandates that “[the officers and directors] must put the interests of the company before their own personal interests.” It is then important to define what the corporation's / company's interests are in a legal context to evaluate whether the Duty of Loyalty is being breached. A corporation's best interests have come to legally be defined as maximizing shareholder value over the long term. The concept of shareholder primacy first emerged with the decision of Dodge V. Ford, which stated in its court opinion that a corporation exists “primarily for the profit of the stockholders.” Since then, it has been emphasized in eBay V. Newmark, where the so - called Unocal test was used. In this Unocal test, the language "proper corporate objectives" is used. In the court decision, the courts characterized proper corporate objectives solely as profit maximization. Specifically, profit maximization over the long term is the proper corporate objective. The language “the Duty of Loyalty therefore mandates that directors maximize the value of the corporation over the long-term for the benefit of the providers of equity capital” is used within a Trados Incorporated Shareholder Litigation court opinion. Acting in a corporation's interests is legally defined by acting to maximize shareholder profit in the long term, though how exactly that is done is often left to business judgement, per the Business judgement rule.

== Ways the proponent of a self-dealing transaction can avoid invalidation ==
- By showing approval by a majority of disinterested directors
- Showing ratification by shareholders (MBCA 8.63)
- Showing transaction was inherently fair (MBCA 8.61)

== U.S. Model Business Corporation Act ==
Section 8.60 of the Model Business Corporation Act states there is a conflict of interest when the director knows that at the time of a commitment that he or a related person is 1) a party to the transaction or 2) has a beneficial financial interest in the transaction that the interest and exercises his influence to the detriment of the corporation.

== See also ==
- Corporate opportunity
- Duty of care (business associations)
- Business Judgment Rule
- Fiduciary management
- Meinhard v. Salmon
