= Duty of care (disambiguation) =

In tort law, a duty of care is a legal obligation on an individual to avoid careless and negligent acts that could foreseeably harm others.

Duty of Care may also refer to:

- Duty of care (business associations), in US corporation and business association law
- Duty of Care (film), a 2017 film
- "Duty of Care" (Holby City), a two-part 2007 television episode
- "Duty of Care" (Law & Order: UK), a 2010 television episode
