= Legal malpractice =

When a lawyer's actions harm a client

Legal malpractice is the term for negligence, breach of fiduciary duty, or breach of contract by a lawyer during the provision of legal services that causes harm to a client.

== Examples ==
A common example of legal malpractice involves the lawyer's missing a deadline for filing a paper with the court or serving a paper on another party, where that error is fatal to the client's case or causes the client to spend more money to resolve the case than would otherwise have been required. For example, a lawyer may commit malpractice by:

- After being retained to file a claim or lawsuit, failing to file a case before the statute of limitations expires.
- Failing to respond to potentially dispositive motions filed by the opposing party.
- Failing to timely file a notice of appeal.

Malpractice may also occur as the result of a breach of the contract pursuant to which the client is represented by the attorney.

== United States ==
Under U.S. law, in order to rise to an actionable level of negligence (an actual breach of a legal duty of care), the injured party must show that the attorney's acts were not merely the result of poor strategy, but that they were the result of errors that no reasonably prudent attorney would make. While the elements of a cause of action for legal malpractice may vary by state, under typical state law the four elements of legal malpractice are:

1. An attorney-client relationship,
2. Negligence by the attorney,
3. A loss or injury to the client caused by the negligence, and
4. Financial loss or injury to the client.

To satisfy the third element, legal malpractice requires proof of what would have happened had the attorney not been negligent; that is, "but for" the attorney's negligence ("but for" causation). If the same result would have occurred without negligence by the attorney, no cause of action will be permitted. "But for" or actual causation can be difficult to prove. If the malpractice alleged occurred in litigation, the legal malpractice case may result in a "trial-within-a-trial" which delves into the facts of the case for which the client originally retained the attorney.

=== Proof of innocence ===
In at least 11 jurisdictions, a person convicted of a crime who then sues his defense attorney must first prove that he was factually innocent (in other words, he must first petition for and obtain exoneration from the court that originally convicted him before filing suit) and that he was convicted only because of his attorney's negligence. A plaintiff who was represented in a civil case by the legal malpractice defendant, must show that the civil case was lost, and would have been won if the legal malpractice complained had not caused it to be lost, or that the plaintiff recovered less than would have been recovered if the negligent attorney had not committed legal malpractice.

Some jurisdictions have rejected or limited application of the actual innocence element of the exoneration rule, meaning that a criminal defendant may pursue a legal malpractice claim against his counsel without first having to prove actual innocence or obtain post-conviction relief.

The rule may be held inapplicable where the question of guilt is irrelevant to the alleged malpractice. For example, in Iowa, a defendant who receives inadequate representation at sentencing was allowed to pursue a malpractice claim without also challenging the underlying conviction. In Kansas, a legal malpractice action was allowed when brought by defendant who was not claiming innocence but was instead asserting that an error by criminal defense counsel cost him the opportunity for a more favorable plea bargain.

Iowa and Kansas have held that proof of innocence is not a separate element of a legal malpractice claim against a criminal defense lawyer, but is instead a factor that a jury may consider when applying the standard elements of legal malpractice.

The Idaho Supreme Court found that to require a defendant to show actual innocence in order to proceed with a legal malpractice claim against a criminal defense lawyer would conflict with the presumption of innocence a defendant is to enjoy at trial, disregards harm that may result to a client other than being convicted, and potentially allow a defense lawyer to shirk duties to a client the lawyer knows to be guilty.

== See also ==
- Fiduciary management
- Ineffective assistance of counsel
- Legal abuse
- Malpractice
- Professional responsibility
