= Peso Silver Mines Ltd v Cropper =

- Supreme Court of Canada

Hearing: April 27, 28, 1966 Judgment: June 20, 1966
- Citations: [1966] S.C.R. 673, 58. D.L.R. (2d) 1
- Prior history: APPEAL and CROSS-APPEAL from a judgment of the Court of Appeal for British Columbia
- Ruling: Appeal and cross-appeal dismissed

Holding
- A director must not make a profit out of property acquired by reason (and only by reason) of his relationship to the company of which he is a director.

Court membership

Reasons given
- Unanimous reasons by: Cartwright J.

Peso Silver Mines Ltd v Cropper, [1966] S.C.R. 673, is a leading Canadian case decided by the Supreme Court of Canada on the fiduciary duty of corporate directors, the boundaries of conflict of interest, and the type of damages that may be obtained in cases of wrongful dismissal.

== Background ==
Dickson, a prospector, owned several mineral claims, one of which was contiguous to claims held by Peso Silver Mines. He offered to sell them to Peso, but its board of directors rejected the offer. Mr. Cropper, a managing director and member of the board, was approached later on by three other investors, and the four formed a private company to acquire the claims, and a public company later to take over, finance and develop them.

Some time later, Peso received an offer from another company to acquire a significant interest in it, and that offer was accepted. A term of the offer provided that the number of directors of the appellant should be increased to nine of whom five should be chosen by the new investor. At a meeting of the new board, Cropper, acting in compliance with a notice from the chairman that it was imperative that all officers of the company make full disclosure of their connection with other mining companies, disclosed his private interest in the companies developing the Dickson claims. However, at a subsequent meeting of the board he refused to comply with the chairman's request that he turn over his interest in them at cost. Thereupon a motion was passed rescinding Cropper's appointment as executive vice-president and as a member of the executive committee. He was asked to vacate the offices of the company and the chairman asked him to resign as a director. Cropper refused to resign as a director, but did so later, and his resignation was accepted.

In an action commenced by Peso, a declaration was claimed that the interests in the companies developing the Dickson claims acquired by the respondent were held by him in trust for the appellant, and it was asked that he be required to deliver the shares to the appellant or to account for the proceeds thereof. Cropper counter-claimed for damages for wrongful dismissal.

== The courts below ==
At trial the action was dismissed and the counter-claim was allowed in the amount of $10,000. On appeal by Cropper to the Court of Appeal, the appeal was dismissed in so far as Peso's action was concerned. However, the Court of Appeal reduced Cropper's damages from $10,000 to $6,500. An appeal and a cross-appeal from the judgment of the Court of Appeal were then brought to this Court.

== At the Supreme Court of Canada ==
In a unanimous decision, the Court dismissed both the appeal and cross-appeal. In doing so, it applied the reasoning of Lord Russell of Killowen in Regal (Hastings) Ltd v Gulliver that it had adopted in previous Canadian jurisprudence, and found that Cropper was not acting in his capacity as a director of the appellant but as an individual member of the public. As Cartwright J. noted, Regal could be summarized in the following observation by Lord Russell:

In the result, I am of opinion that the directors standing in a fiduciary relationship to Regal in regard to the exercise of their powers as directors, and having obtained these shares by reason and only by reason of the fact that they were directors of Regal and in the course of the execution of that office, are accountable for the profits which they have made out of them.

Cartwright J. then went on to hold:

On the facts of the case at bar I find it impossible to say that the respondent obtained the interests he holds in Cross Bow and Mayo by reason of the fact that he was a director of the appellant and in the course of the execution of that office. When Dickson, at Dr. Aho's suggestion, offered his claims to the appellant it was the duty of the respondent as director to take part in the decision of the board as to whether that offer should be accepted or rejected. At that point he stood in a fiduciary relationship to the appellant. There are affirmative findings of fact that he and his co-directors acted in good faith, solely in the interests of the appellant and with sound business reasons in rejecting the offer. There is no suggestion in the evidence that the offer to the appellant was accompanied by any confidential information unavailable to any prospective purchaser or that the respondent as director had access to any such information by reason of his office. When, later, Dr. Aho approached the appellant it was not in his capacity as a director of the appellant, but as an individual member of the public whom Dr. Aho was seeking to interest as a co-adventurer.

Accordingly, the appeal was dismissed.

On the question of the amount of damages that was raised in the cross-appeal, the Court agreed with the Court of Appeal that "the claim being founded on breach of contract the damages cannot be increased by reason of the circumstances of dismissal whether in respect of the respondent's wounded feelings or the prejudicial effect upon his reputation and chances of finding other employment." Therefore, the cross-appeal was also dismissed.

== Aftermath ==
The ruling expanded on a hypothetical case that had been given in the Court of Appeal of England and Wales in its deliberations in Regal (Hastings) Ltd v Gulliver, that had been endorsed by Lord Denning MR in his judgment in Boardman v Phipps. This was the reasoning endorsed by Cartwright J. in Peso.

Peso was subsequently distinguished by the SCC in Aero Service Ltd. v. O'Malley, which revolved around significantly different facts. Peso and Aero Service continue to illustrate the boundaries of conflict of interest that directors of Canadian companies must keep in mind in their deliberations.

== See also ==
- List of Supreme Court of Canada cases
