= Boulting v Association of Cinematograph, Television and Allied Technicians =

Boulting v ACTAT
- Court: Court of Appeal
- Citation: [1963] 2 QB 606

Court membership
- Judges sitting: Lord Denning MR; Diplock LJ; Upjohn LJ

Keywords
- Employee; manager; nominee director

Boulting v Association of Cinematograph, Television and Allied Technicians [1963] 2 QB 606 is a UK labour law and UK company law case from the Court of Appeal. It covers the issue of what it means to act in the best interests of the company, relevant under the section 172 of the Companies Act 2006 ("Duty to promote the success of the company").

== Facts ==
Two managing directors of a film company, John and Roy Boulting, applied for a declaration that while they were performing 'management functions' (e.g. producing and directing) they were not eligible for membership of the Association of Cinematograph, Television and Allied Technicians, a trade union (the ACTAT). Until 1950 they had been union members, but then they tore up their cards and paid no further subscriptions. In 1959 the union claimed that they needed to pay up to date for their membership fees, and said they must be members of the union.

At this time, like many unions, there was a closed shop agreement. Rule 7 of the union's rules said that "The association shall consist of all employees engaged on the technical side of film production... including film directors." They also wanted an injunction restraining the union from making them join.

== Judgment ==
A majority Court of Appeal held that there was no principle which prevented every employee from becoming union members. Lord Justices Upjohn and Diplock held, firstly, there was nothing ultra vires about rule 7. Secondly, the fiduciary rule that one should not put oneself in a position of conflict of interest was aimed to protect the principal (in this case the company the managing directors worked for) not the agent (the managing directors). So they could not rely on this argument as a way to shield themselves. And thirdly, there was no conflict of interest anyway between being a union member and a manager. However, they said a court is entitled to grant an injunction against a trade union to prevent an injury which is not "alleged to have been committed" notwithstanding the Trade Disputes Act 1906 s.4(1).

Lord Denning MR dissented. He argued that the word "employee" in rule 7 did not include managers. Even if it did, it would be unlawful to force managers to become union members unless provision was made for possible conflicts of interest.

In this situation it seems to me that the principle applies which was stated by Lord Cranworth L.C. in Aberdeen Railway Co. v. Blaikie Brothers (1854) 1 Macq. 461, 471, H.L. (Sc.). in these words:

The directors are a body to whom is delegated the duty of managing the general affairs of the company. A corporate body can only act by agents, and it is of course the duty of those agents so to act as best to promote the interests of the corporation whose affairs they are conducting. Such agents have duties to discharge of a fiduciary nature towards their principal. and it is a rule of universal application, that no one, having such duties to discharge, shall be allowed to enter into engagements in which he has, or can have, a personal interest conflicting, or which possibly may conflict, with the interests of those whom he is bound to protect.

Lord Cranworth L.C. there refers to a conflicting interest. But the principle also applies to a conflicting duty. It seems to me that no one, who has duties of a fiduciary nature to discharge, can be allowed to enter into an engagement by which he binds himself to disregard those duties or to act inconsistently with them. No stipulation is lawful by which he agrees to carry out his duties in accordance with the instructions of another rather than on his own conscientious judgment; or by which he agrees to subordinate the interests of those whom he must protect to the interests of someone else. Suppose a Member of Parliament should be in the pay of some outside body, in return for which he binds himself to vote as he is directed to do. The agreement would clearly be void as against public policy: see Osborne v. Amalgamated Society of Railway Servants [1909] 1 Ch. 163, 186, 187; 25 T.L.R. 107, C.A. by Fletcher Moulton L.J.; and on appeal by Lord Shaw of Dunfermline. [1910] A.C. 87, 110, 111, H.L. Or take a nominee director, that is, a director of a company who is nominated by a large shareholder to represent his interests. There is nothing wrong in it. It is done every day. Nothing wrong, that is, so long as the director is left free to exercise his best judgment in the interests of the company which he serves. But if he is put upon terms that he is bound to act in the affairs of the company in accordance with the directions of his patron, it is beyond doubt unlawful (see Kregor v. Hollins (1913) 109 L.T. 225, 228, C.A by Avory J.), or if he agrees to subordinate the interests of the company to the interests of his patron, it is conduct oppressive to the other shareholders for which the patron can be brought to book: see Scottish Co-operative Wholesale Society Ltd. v. Meyer [1959] A.C. 324, 341, 363, 366, 367; [1958] 3 W.L.R. 404; [1958] 3 All E.R. 66, H.L. So, also, if a director of a company becomes a member of a trade union on the terms that he is to act in the company's affairs on the instructions of the trade union, or in accordance with the policy of the trade union (rather than according to what he thinks best in the interests of the company), such an agreement of membership is unlawful. It is contrary to public policy that any director should be made to deny his trust and throw over the interests of those whom he is bound to protect. Take the converse. Suppose the employee of a company is an officer of a trade union. Would it be lawful for his employers to approach him and – by promises of promotion or threat of dismissal – get him to promise that he would act in the union's affairs on the instructions of his employers? It would in my judgment be unlawful. An officer of a trade union, too, is in a fiduciary position towards the members, and no employer would be justified in seeking, by promises or threats, to induce him to act disloyally towards them. In each one of these cases the reason is simple: it is wrong to induce another to act inconsistently with the duty of fidelity which he has undertaken by contract or trust to perform: cf. Bents Brewery Co. Ltd. v. Hogan [1945] 2 All E.R. 570 and D. C. Thomson & Co. Ltd. v. Deakin [1952] Ch. 646, 694; [1952] 2 T.L.R. 105; [1952] 2 All E.R. 361, C.A.

Lord Denning also famously commented on the position of "nominee" directors. He expressed the view that there is nothing wrong with a director being nominated by a particular shareholder to represent his interests "so long as the director is left free to exercise his best judgment in the interests of the company which he serves. But if he is put upon terms that he is bound to act in the affairs of the company in accordance with the directions of his patron, it is beyond doubt unlawful". That statement of the law was cited with approval by the Privy Council in Central Bank of Ecuador v Conticorp SA [2015] UKPC 11 at paragraph 25.

== See also ==
- Directors' duties
- Judgment of the European Court of Justice of 27 June 1996. P. H. Asscher v Staatssecretaris van Financiën. Reference for a preliminary ruling: Hoge Raad - Netherlands. Article 52 of the EC Treaty - Requirement of equal treatment - Income tax on non-residents. Case C-107/94.
