= Malpractice =

Area of law concerning negligence by professionals

In the law of torts, malpractice, also known as professional negligence, is an "instance of negligence or incompetence on the part of a professional".

Professionals who may become the subject of malpractice actions include:

- medical professionals: a medical malpractice claim may be brought against a doctor or other healthcare provider who fails to exercise the degree of care and skill that a similarly situated professional of the same medical specialty would provide under the circumstances.
- lawyers: a legal malpractice claim may be brought against a lawyer who fails to render services with the level of skill, care, and diligence that a reasonable lawyer would apply under similar circumstances.
- financial professionals: professionals such as accountants, financial planners, and stockbrokers may be subject to claims for professional negligence based upon their failure to meet professional standards when providing services to their clients.
- architects and engineers: a construction professional may be accused of professional negligence for failing to meet professional standards in the design and construction of buildings and structures.

== Proof of malpractice ==
Professional negligence actions require a professional relationship between the professional and the person claiming to have been injured by malpractice. For example, to sue a lawyer for malpractice the person bringing the claim must have had an attorney-client relationship with the lawyer.

To succeed in a malpractice action under typical malpractice law, the person making a malpractice claim must prove that the professional committed an act of culpable negligence and that the person suffered an injury due to the professional's error.

== Medical malpractice ==
Medical malpractice is a highly complex area of law, with laws that differ significantly between jurisdictions.

In Australia, medical malpractice and the rise in claims against individual and institutional providers have led to the evolution of patient advocates.
