= Directors' duties =

Directors' duties are a series of statutory, common law and equitable obligations owed primarily by members of the board of directors to the corporation that employs them. It is a central part of corporate law and corporate governance. Directors' duties are analogous to duties owed by trustees to beneficiaries, and by agents to principals.

Among different jurisdictions, a number of similarities between the framework for directors' duties exist:

- directors owe duties to the corporation, and not to individual shareholders, employees or creditors outside exceptional circumstances
- directors' core duty is to remain loyal to the company, and avoid conflicts of interest
- directors are expected to display a high standard of care, skill or diligence
- directors are expected to act in good faith to promote the success of the corporation

== Australia ==
=== General Law ===
Directors have fiduciary duties under general law in Australia. These are:

- Duty to act in good faith and not to act contrary to the interest of the company
- Duty not to use power for an improper purpose
- Duty to avoid conflicts of interest
- Duty to retain discretion

=== Statutory Duties ===
Directors also have duties under Corporations Act 2001:

- Section 181: Mirrors the general law duty to act in good faith, in the best interests of the company and for proper purpose.
- Section 182: Duty not to misuse position to gain advantage
- Section 183: Duty not to misuse information to gain advantage

=== Breach of Duties ===
There is an important distinction between the general law and statute in that there are different consequences when it comes for breach

- If a director is acting dishonestly or recklessly then there will be criminal liability imported under statute. But not in general law.
- At general law where a director breaches their duties the likely remedy will be equitable damages or statutory compensation or recission. But within context of statute it is not possible. If it is a statutory duty, ASIC will enforce statute.

== Canada ==
=== Tripartite Fiduciary Duty ===
In Canada, a debate exists on the precise nature of directors' duties following the controversial landmark judgment in BCE Inc. v. 1976 Debentureholders. This Supreme Court of Canada decision has raised questions as to the nature and extent to which directors owe a duty to non-shareholders. Scholarly literature has defined this as a "tripartite fiduciary duty", composed of (1) an overarching duty to the corporation, which contains two component duties — (2) a duty to protect shareholder interests from harm, and (3) a procedural duty of "fair treatment" for relevant stakeholder interests. This tripartite structure encapsulates the duty of directors to act in the "best interests of the corporation, viewed as a good corporate citizen".

Not all Canadian jurisdictions recognise the "proper purpose" duty as separate from the "good faith" duty. This division was rejected in British Columbia in Teck Corporation v. Millar (1972).

== United States ==
=== Business judgment ===
- Smith v. Van Gorkom, 488 A.2d 858 (Del. 1985) and §102)b)(7) DGCL
- Dodge v. Ford Motor Co., 204 Mich. 459, 170 N.W. 668 (1919)
- Aronson v. Lewis
- In re Caremark International Inc. Derivative Litigation 698 A 2d 959 (Del. Ch. 1996)
- In re Walt Disney Co. Derivative Litigation 907 A.2d 693 (Del. Ch. 2005)

== United Kingdom ==
=== Acting within powers ===
- s.171 Companies Act 2006

Directors are also strictly charged to exercise their powers only for a proper purpose. For instance, were a director to issue a large number of new shares, not for the purposes of raising capital but to defeat a potential takeover bid, that would be an improper purpose.

However, in many jurisdictions the members of the company are permitted to ratify transactions that would otherwise fall foul of this principle. It is also largely accepted in most jurisdictions that this principle should be capable of being abrogated in the company's constitution.

Directors must exercise their powers for a proper purpose. While in many instances an improper purpose is readily evident, such as a director looking to feather his or her own nest or divert an investment opportunity to a relative, such breaches usually involve a breach of the director's duty to act in good faith. Greater difficulties arise where the director, while acting in good faith, is serving a purpose that is not regarded by the law as proper.

The seminal authority in relation to what amounts to a proper purpose is the Privy Council decision of Howard Smith Ltd v. Ampol Ltd. The case concerned the power of the directors to issue new shares. It was alleged that the directors had issued a large number of new shares purely to deprive a particular shareholder of his voting majority. The court rejected an argument that the power to issue shares could only be properly exercised to raise new capital as too narrow, and held that it would be a proper exercise of the director's powers to issue shares to a larger company to ensure the financial stability of the company, or as part of an agreement to exploit mineral rights owned by the company. If so, an incidental result (even desirable) that a shareholder lost his majority, or a takeover bid was defeated would not itself make the share issue improper. But if the sole purpose was to destroy a voting majority, or block a takeover bid, that would be an improper purpose.

=== Promoting company success ===
- s.172 Companies Act 2006, "to promote the success of the company for the benefit of its members as a whole". It sets out six factors to which a director must have regards in fulfilling the duty to promote success. These are:
- the likely consequences of any decision in the long term
- the interests of the company’s employees
- the need to foster the company’s business relationships with suppliers, customers and others
- the impact of the company’s operations on the community and the environment
- the desirability of the company maintaining a reputation for high standards of business conduct, and
- the need to act fairly as between members of a company

This represents a considerable departure from the traditional notion that directors' duties are owed only to the company. Previously in the United Kingdom, under the Companies Act 1985, protections for non-member stakeholders were considerably more limited (see e.g., s.309, which permitted directors to take into account the interests of employees but that could be enforced only by the shareholders, and not by the employees themselves. The changes have therefore been the subject of some criticism. Directors must act honestly and in bona fide. The test is a subjective one—the directors must act in "good faith in what they consider—not what the court may consider—is in the interests of the company..." per Lord Greene MR. However, the directors may still be held to have failed in this duty where they fail to direct their minds to the question of whether in fact a transaction was in the best interests of the company.

Difficult questions arise when treating the company too abstractly. For example, it may benefit a corporate group as a whole for a company to guarantee the debts of a "sister" company, even if there is no "benefit" to the company giving the guarantee. Similarly, conceptually at least, there is no benefit to a company in returning profits to shareholders by way of dividend. However, the more pragmatic approach illustrated in the Australian case of Mills v. Mills normally prevails:

"[directors are] not required by the law to live in an unreal region of detached altruism and to act in the vague mood of ideal abstraction from obvious facts which [sic] must be present to the mind of any honest and intelligent man when he exercises his powers as a director."

- Hutton v. West Cork Railway Co (1883) 23 Ch D 654, per Bowen LJ,

"money which [sic] is not theirs but the company’s, if they are spending it for the purposes which are reasonably incidental to the carrying on of the business of the company. That is the general doctrine. Bona fides cannot be the sole test, otherwise you might have a lunatic conducting the affairs of the company, and paying away its money with both hands in a manner perfectly bona fide yet perfectly irrational… It is for the directors to judge, provided it is a matter which is reasonably incidental to the carrying on of the business of the company… The law does not say that there are to be no cakes and ale, but there are to be no cakes and ale except such as are required for the benefit of the company."

- Boulting v Association of Cinematograph, Television and Allied Technicians [1963] 2 QB 606

=== Independent judgment ===
- s.173 Companies Act 2006

Directors cannot, without the consent of the company, fetter their discretion in relation to the exercise of their powers, and cannot bind themselves to vote in a particular way at future board meetings. This is so even if there is no improper motive or purpose, and no personal advantage to the director.

This does not mean, however, that the board cannot agree to the company entering into a contract that binds the company to a certain course, even if certain actions in that course will require further board approval. The company remains bound, but the directors retain the discretion to vote against taking the future actions (although that may involve a breach by the company of the contract that the board previously approved).

=== Care and skill ===
Traditionally, the level of care and skill a director must demonstrate has been framed largely with reference to the non-executive director. In Re City Equitable Fire Insurance Co [1925] Ch 407, it was expressed in purely subjective terms, where the court held that:

"a director need not exhibit in the performance of his duties a greater degree of skill than may reasonably be expected from a person of his knowledge and experience." (emphasis added)

However, this decision was based firmly in the older notions (see above) that prevailed at the time as to the mode of corporate decision making, and effective control residing in the shareholders; if they elected and put up with an incompetent decision maker, they should not have recourse to complain.

However, a more modern approach has since developed, and in Dorchester Finance Co Ltd v Stebbing [1989] BCLC 498 the court held that the rule in Equitable Fire related only to skill, and not to diligence. With respect to diligence, what was required was:

"such care as an ordinary man might be expected to take on his own behalf."

This was a dual subjective and objective test, and one deliberately pitched at a higher level.

More recently, it has been suggested that both the tests of skill and diligence should be assessed objectively and subjectively; in the United Kingdom the statutory provisions relating to directors' duties in the new Companies Act 2006 have been codified on this basis.

- s.174, Companies Act 2006
- Re Barings plc (No.5) [1999] 1 BCLC 433
- Re D’Jan of London Ltd [1994] 1 BCLC 561

=== Loyalty and conflicts of interest ===
Directors also owe strict duties not to permit any conflict of interest or conflict with their duty to act in the best interests of the company. This rule is so strictly enforced that, even where the conflict of interest or conflict of duty is purely hypothetical, the directors can be forced to disgorge all personal gains arising from it. In Aberdeen Ry v. Blaikie (1854) 1 Macq HL 461 Lord Cranworth stated in his judgment that,

"A corporate body can only act by agents, and it is, of course, the duty of those agents so to act as best to promote the interests of the corporation whose affairs they are conducting. Such agents have duties to discharge of a fiduciary nature towards their principal. And it is a rule of universal application that no one, having such duties to discharge, shall be allowed to enter into engagements in which he has, or can have, a personal interest conflicting or which possibly may conflict, with the interests of those whom he is bound to protect... So strictly is this principle adhered to that no question is allowed to be raised as to the fairness or unfairness of the contract entered into..."

- s.175 Companies Act 2006
- Keech v Sandford (1726) Sel Cas. Ch.61
- Regal (Hastings) Ltd v Gulliver [1942] All ER 378
- Cook v Deeks [1916] 1 AC 554
- Industrial Development Consultants Ltd v Cooley [1972]
- Dorchester Finance Co Ltd v Stebbing [1989] BCLC 498
- In Plus Group Ltd v Pyke
- Foster Bryant Surveying Ltd v Bryant [2007] EWCA Civ 200
- O'Donnell v Shanahan [2009] EWCA Civ 751

As fiduciaries, the directors may not put themselves in a position where their interests and duties conflict with the duties that they owe to the company. The law takes the view that good faith must not only be done, but must be manifestly seen to be done, and zealously patrols the conduct of directors in this regard; and will not allow directors to escape liability by asserting that his decision was in fact well founded. Traditionally, the law has divided conflicts of duty and interest into three sub-categories.

Transactions with the company

By definition, where a director enters into a transaction with a company, there is a conflict between the director's interest (to do well for himself out of the transaction) and his duty to the company (to ensure that the company gets as much as it can out of the transaction). This rule is so strictly enforced that, even where the conflict of interest or conflict of duty is purely hypothetical, the directors can be forced to disgorge all personal gains arising from it. In Aberdeen Ry v. Blaikie Lord Cranworth stated in his judgment that:

"A corporate body can only act by agents, and it is, of course, the duty of those agents so to act as best to promote the interests of the corporation whose affairs they are conducting. Such agents have duties to discharge of a fiduciary nature towards their principal. And it is a rule of universal application that no one, having such duties to discharge, shall be allowed to enter into engagements in which he has, or can have, a personal interest conflicting or which possibly may conflict, with the interests of those whom he is bound to protect... So strictly is this principle adhered to that no question is allowed to be raised as to the fairness or unfairness of the contract entered into..."

However, in many jurisdictions the members of the company are permitted to ratify transactions which would otherwise fall foul of this principle. It is also largely accepted in most jurisdictions that this principle should be capable of being abrogated in the company's constitution.

In many countries there is also a statutory duty to declare interests in relation to any transactions, and the director can be fined for failing to make disclosure.

Use of corporate property, opportunity, or information

Directors must not, without the informed consent of the company, use for their own profit the company's assets, opportunities, or information. This prohibition is much less flexible than the prohibition against the transactions with the company, and attempts to circumvent it using provisions in the articles have met with limited success.

In Regal (Hastings) Ltd v Gulliver [1942] All ER 378 the House of Lords, in upholding what was regarded as a wholly unmeritorious claim by the shareholders, held that:

"(i) that what the directors did was so related to the affairs of the company that it can properly be said to have been done in the course of their management and in the utilisation of their opportunities and special knowledge as directors; and (ii) that what they did resulted in profit to themselves."

And accordingly, the directors were required to disgorge the profits that they made, and the shareholders received their windfall.

The decision has been followed in several subsequent cases, and is now regarded as settled law.

Competing with the company

Directors cannot, clearly, compete directly with the company without a conflict of interests arising. Similarly, they should not act as directors of competing companies, as their duties to each company would then conflict with each other.

- Hogg v. Cramphorn Ltd. [1967] Ch 254

=== Remedies for breach of duty ===
As in most jurisdictions, the law provides for a variety of remedies in the event of a breach by the directors of their duties:

1. injunction or declaration
2. damages or compensation
3. restoration of the company's property
4. rescission of the relevant contract
5. account of profits
6. summary dismissal

S 176 A Duty not to accept benefits from third parties.

A director must not accept financial or non financial benefits from third parties.

== See also ==
- UK company law
- Aktiengesetz
- Delaware General Corporation Law
- Say on pay
- Fiduciary
- Non-executive director
- Executive director
