= William T. Allen =

American judge (1944–2019)

- Born: July 17, 1944; United States
- Died: October 13, 2019 (aged 75)
- Education: New York University, B.S., 1969; Dickinson Law School, Honorary L.L.D., 1972; University of Texas, J.D., 1972
- Occupations: Chancellor of Delaware; Founder & Director, NYU Pollack Center for Law & Business; Professor New York University Stern School of Business faculty New York University School of Law faculty
- Known for: Corporate law Corporate governance

William T. Allen (July 17, 1944 – October 13, 2019) was a professor of corporate law at New York University law school, and the Chancellor of the Delaware Court of Chancery from 1985 to 1997. He also worked for the bank and business law firm Wachtell, Lipton, Rosen & Katz.

== Career ==
=== Chancellor of the Delaware Court of Chancery ===
Allen was the Chancellor of the Delaware Court of Chancery from 1985 to 1997. In the Lacos Land Co v Arden Group, Inc case, Allen found that "As a director and officer Briskin has a duty to act with complete loyalty to the interests of the corporation and its shareholders. His position in demanding the amendments under threat of thwarting corporate transactions is inconsistent with that obligation. The stockholder vote was fatally flawed by the threats. Shareholders were inappropriately placed in a position in which they were told that if they refused to vote affirmatively Briskin would not support future transactions that might be beneficial to the corporation. A vote of the shareholders under such circumstances cannot satisfy the mandate of Section 242(b) requiring shareholder consent to charter amendments."

As Chancellor Allen observed that: "The judges of that court spend most of their time adjudicating cases of alleged breaches of fiduciary duty by corporate officer or directors."

==== Independence Standards Board ====
Allen was responsible for the establishment of the Independence Standards Board in July 1997, which was "created in response to the increasing challenges of addressing auditor independence issues as business and professional relationships [became] more complex," the board [was to] operate within the American Institute of Certified Public Accountants (AICPA) and will be under the oversight of the Securities and Exchange Commission (SEC).

=== Wachtell, Lipton, Rosen & Katz ===
Allen served as counsel in the Corporate Department at Wachtell, Lipton, Rosen & Katz.

=== New York University School of Law ===
William Allen began teaching at the New York University School of Law in 1997. Allen founded and was Director of the New York University Center for Law and Business.

== Cases ==
- In re Caremark International Inc. Derivative Litigation 698 A 2d 959 (Del. Ch. 1996)
- Lacos Land Co v Arden Group, Inc

== Publications ==
He coauthored with Han Shen, "Assessing China's Top-down Securities Market” in Morck Randall & Bernard Yeung eds. "Capitalizing China", The University of Chicago Press 2012;

His wrote Commentaries and Cases on the Law of Business Organization, which was first published in 2003 and is now in its fifth edition.

His January 2008 Davies Fund for Business Law Lecture delivered at Osgoode Hall Law School in Toronto was centitled "Modern Corporate Governance and the Erosion of the Business Judgment Rule in Delaware Corporate Law".

== See also ==
- US corporate law
