= Lacos Land Co v. Arden Group Inc =

Lacos Land Co v Arden Group, Inc
- Court: Delaware Court of Chancery
- Citation: 517 A 2d 271 (Del Ch 1986)

Keywords
- Charter amendment

Lacos Land Co v Arden Group, Inc, 517 A 2d 271 (Del Ch 1986) is a US corporate law case, concerning coercive tactics by a board of directors in pursuing charter amendments.

== Facts ==
A new class B with ten votes per share, entitled to elect 75% of the Arden board was proposed by the major shareholder and CEO, Bernard Briskin. B shares would have reduced dividend rights and limits on transfers. All Arden shareholders could exchange their common shares for the new class B shares. Lacos Land Co sought an injunction, arguing it was merely a device to transfer control to Mr Briskin, because only Mr Briskin would be likely to take up the offer. 64% of votes were in favour, 14% were against from common stock and 74% in favour of preferred stock, half of which was on direction by management.

== Judgment ==
Chancellor Allen held that the amendments were voidable because (1) Briskin had threatened to block transactions that were in the company's interests if the plan was not passed which could dilute his ownership (2) the proxy statement showed the only reason for the plan was Briskin demanded it. He said 'coercion' is not a meaningful word in itself, because it matters why particular behaviour counts as coercion. And here, Briskin was using his influence as a director, not merely giving advice as another shareholder. He breach his duty to act with 'complete loyalty to the interests of the corporation and it shareholders' (Winberger (1983) and Guth (1939)). Although Briskin could have been acting selfishly or selflessly, the vote was still...

fatally flawed by the implied (indeed, the expressed) threats that unless the proposed amendments were authorized, he would oppose transactions "which could be determined by the Board of Directors to be in the best interests of all of the shareholders". As a corporate fiduciary, Mr. Briskin has no right to take such a position, even if benevolently motivated in doing so.

Chancellor Allen noted that the dual class creation was not a novel idea, General Investment Co v Bethlehem Steel Corp, 87 NJ Eq 234, 100 A 347 (NJ Ch 1917) 'although it is one that thanks to its potential as an anti-takeover device, has recently emerged from the reaches of the corporation law chorus to strut its moment upon center stage where corporate drama is acted out.' He noted that Mr Briskin's tenure had been 'active and effective' because though no dividends had been paid since 1970 the stock price had risen steadily from $1 to $25 per share. The motivation to 'protect his power to control Arden's business future... while it may be suspect - since it may reflect not a desire to protect business policy and capabilities for the benefit of the corporation and its shareholders but rather a wish simply to retain the benefits of office - does not itself constitute a wrong' (Unocal (1985) and Kaplan (1977)).

Our corporation law provides great flexibility to shareholders in creating the capital structure of their firm. See, e.g., Providence and Worcester Co. v. Baker, Del. Supr., 378 A.2d 121 (1977). Differing classes of stock with differing voting rights are permissible under our law, 8 Del. C. § 151(a); Topkis v. Delaware Hardware Co., Del. Ch., 2 A.2d 114 (1938); restriction on transfers are possible, 8 Del.C. § 202, and charter provisions requiring the filling of certain directorates by a class of stock are, if otherwise properly adopted, valid. Lehrman v. Cohen, Del. Supr., 222 A.2d 800 (1966). Thus, each of the significant characteristics of the Class B Common Stock is in principle a valid power or limitation of common stock. The primary inquiry therefore is whether the Arden shareholders have effectively exercised their will to amend the Company's restated certificate of incorporation so as to authorize the implementation of the dual class common stock structure. The charge is that they have not done so -- despite the report of the judge of elections that the proposed amendments carried -- in part because the proxy statement upon which the vote was solicited was materially misleading and in part because the entire plan to put in place the Class B stock constitutes a breach of duty on the part of a dominated board.

== See also ==
- US corporate law
