= Graef Crystal =

Graef "Bud" S. Crystal was an expert on executive compensation, often cited as a critic of excessive packages. He started work as an executive compensation consultant in 1959. He worked for twenty years at the consulting firm Towers Perrin, and also taught at the Haas School of Business. He advised on pay at Coca-Cola Company and American Express. He authored books on executive compensation as both an advisor and critic. He wrote a column on Bloomberg, and subsequently published on his own website.

== Selected works ==
- Compensating U.S. Executives Abroad (1972)
- Executive Compensation: Money, Motivation, and Imagination (1978)
- Financial Motivation For Executives (1978)
- Questions and Answers on Executive Compensation: How to Get What You're Worth (1984)
- In Search of Excess: The Overcompensation of American Executives (1991)
