= In re Caremark International Inc. Derivative Litigation =

Legal case and corporate law precedent

- Court: Delaware Court of Chancery
- Full case name: In re Caremark International Inc. Derivative Litigation
- Decided: September 25, 1996
- Citation: 698 A.2d 959 (Del. Ch. 1996)

Court membership
- Judge sitting: Chancellor William T. Allen

Keywords
- Directors' duties

In re Caremark International Inc. Derivative Litigation, 698 A.2d 959 (Del. Ch. 1996), was a Delaware Court of Chancery civil action. It is an important case in United States corporate law discussing a director's duty of care in the context of oversight. It raised the question of what a board's responsibility is with respect to the organization and monitoring of an enterprise to assure that a corporation functions within the law to achieve its purposes. Chancellor William T. Allen wrote the opinion.

== Facts ==
The shareholders of Caremark International, Inc. brought a derivative suit alleging that its directors had breached their duty of care by failing to put in place adequate internal control systems. This was said to have enabled the company's employees to commit criminal offenses, resulting in substantial fines and civil penalties amounting to over $250 million.

== Judgment ==
Chancellor William T. Allen approved a settlement contract requiring stricter oversight of corporate employees. He noted that most company decisions do not need director supervision: "Legally, the board itself will be required only to authorize the most significant corporate acts or transactions: mergers, changes in capital structure, fundamental changes in business, appointment and compensation of the CEO, etc."

Allen pointed to Graham v. Allis-Chalmers Mfg. Co. (1963), where the company violated antitrust law without the directors knowing what the employees had done but the court rejected the claim that the directors ought to have known because "absent cause for suspicion there is no duty upon the directors to install and operate a corporate system of espionage to ferret out wrongdoing which they have no reason to suspect exists." He noted that in the instant case there were no grounds for suspicion, stating that boards do no wrong "simply for assuming the integrity of employees and the honesty of their dealings."

Allen held that, since Smith v. Van Gorkom (1985), it was clear that "relevant and timely information is an essential predicate for satisfaction of the board's supervisory and monitoring role under s 141 of the DGCL." He wrote that directors must "assur[e] themselves that information and reporting systems exist in the organization that are reasonably designed to provide senior management and to the board itself timely, accurate information sufficient to allow management and the board, each within its scope, to reach informed judgments concerning both the corporation's compliance with law and its business performance." He stated that the level of detail for any such system is a business judgment matter, but that failure to have some reasonable system may "render a director liable for losses caused by non-compliance with applicable legal standards."

Generally where a claim of directorial liability for corporate loss is predicated upon ignorance of liability created activities within the corporation, as in Graham or in this case, in my opinion only a sustained or systematic failure of the board to exercise oversight – such as an utter failure to attempt to assure a reasonable information and reporting system exists – will establish the lack of good faith that is a necessary condition to liability.

A director's obligation includes a duty to attempt in good faith to assure that a corporate information and reporting system, which the board concludes is adequate, exists, and that failure to do so under some circumstances may, in theory at least, render a director liable for losses.

Allen went on to define a multi-factor test designed to determine when this duty of care is breached. To show that directors breached their oversight duty (a duty later held to fall under the broader category of the duty of loyalty), he held that plaintiffs must show that:

- The directors knew or should have known that violations of the law were occurring, and in either event
- The directors took no steps in a good faith effort to prevent or remedy the situation, and
- Such failure proximately resulted in the losses complained of (though this last element may be thought to constitute an affirmative defense).

== Significance ==
Caremark is most widely known and cited for its expanded vision of the duty of oversight. Because of its holding, corporations strengthened their compliance programs.

In Marchand v. Barnhill (2019), in which the Delaware Supreme Court reversed a lower court’s dismissal of a stockholder lawsuit against the members of the board of directors and two officers of Blue Bell Creameries, Chief Justice Leo E. Strine Jr. penned the court’s unanimous opinion that the board of directors had "failed to implement any system to monitor Blue Bell’s food safety performance or compliance" and applied the duty to monitor doctrine enunciated in In re Caremark. He quoted In re Caremark in adding that "a board’s 'utter failure to attempt to assure a reasonable information and reporting system exists' is an act of bad faith in breach of the duty of loyalty."

== See also ==
- US corporate law
- Re Barings plc (No 5) [1999] 1 BCLC 433
