= Fiduciary management =

Fiduciary management is an approach to asset management that involves an asset owner appointing a third party to manage the total assets of the asset owner on an integrated basis through a combination of advisory and delegated investment services, with a view to achieving the asset owner's overall investment objectives. In principle, the model can be applied to the investments of any asset owner. In practice, the label is currently only used in relation to the management of institutional assets as opposed to retail assets and in relation to the management of assets of pension funds in particular and insurance companies to a lesser degree.

== History ==
Fiduciary management originally evolved in the Netherlands and the UK in the early years of the 21st century.

One of the first to air the concept was Anton van Nunen and in the Netherlands it was first implemented at VGZ, a Dutch insurance company, where Haitse Hoos was the first Chief Investment Officer of a fiduciary mandate. After that, the concept was adopted quickly by Dutch pension funds. According to research by Bureau Bosch, more than 75% of Dutch pension fund assets were managed using the fiduciary management model by Q1 2009.

UK pension schemes started using fiduciary management in 2003, when some clients of River and Mercantile Solutions (formerly P-Solve), the ex-investment consulting arm of Punter Southall, asked it to implement its investment advice for them. The model has since gained considerable ground in the UK.

One of the first international fiduciary mandates was implemented by the Germany company Henkel in 2006. The UK investment bank RBS (Royal Bank of Scotland, Solutions team led by Bart Kuijpers) developed an approach to virtually manage multi-country pension plans in a holistic manner. The mandate to select external managers was eventually awarded to BlackRock, where RBS managed the risk of the mismatch between assets and liabilities via a liability driven investment mandate.

== Overview ==
The primary drivers for the emergence of fiduciary management as an asset management model are the increasing complexity of asset management and the (increasing) economies of scale in asset management. The complexity manifests itself primarily in three different ways: a) increasing range of options available for the investment of assets and management of risk (e.g. new asset classes such as hedge funds and new instruments such as swaps and other financial derivative instruments), b) increasing regulatory complexity (e.g. the Financial Assessment Framework (FTK) for Dutch pension funds) and c) the increasing (real or perceived) instability and or volatility in financial markets which calls for a more dynamic approach to asset management. Only those asset owners that have sufficient scale can organise themselves in an economically efficient and sustainable manner to handle this increasing complexity. Increasing specialisation (a direct result of the increasing complexity itself) and availability of increasingly powerful information technology have contributed to a further increase in the minimum size that is required to efficiently manage institutional assets. These factors are consistent with the fact that fiduciary management has – at least to date – been adopted by pension funds primarily. After all, many pension funds are relatively small (at least in terms of the modern standards in the finance industry where tens of billions are the standard) and are managed by part-time, lay trustees. As a result, many pension funds lack the scale and skill to effectively and efficiently manage the increasing complexity internally.

Fiduciary management helps such organisations by providing an integrated solution by providing advice on the setting of an appropriate investment strategy, the construction and dynamic management of a well-diversified portfolio, the implementation of that portfolio (including the selection and appointment of third party asset managers and custodians, and continuous monitoring and oversight of risk on an integrated basis. It is a form of outsourcing in which the implementation and oversight of a pension fund’s investment strategy are all entrusted to a single external provider (the fiduciary manager) subject to the investment strategy set by the asset owner. Important to note is that, despite the label 'fiduciary management', by law fiduciary duty generally cannot be delegated. Strategic decisions must therefore continue to be taken by the asset owner.

The providers of fiduciary management services can be divided into three groups:

=== Asset managers ===
These are commercial organisations that traditionally specialise in the management of specific asset management products in specific asset classes. Some of those have evolved to offer a 'total solution', including advisory services. They in turn can be divided into three groups: a) diversified asset managers with expertise in a broad range of asset classes, b) multi-managers, and c) (liability) hedging specialists. Leading examples in the first group include AXA, Blackrock, BMO Global Asset Management, Goldman Sachs, ING, Kempen and Robeco – Corestone while Russell Investments and SEI are leading examples of the second group. Cardano is an example of the third group.

=== Pension delivery organisations ===
These are organisations that have been created by pension funds by spinning off their in-house teams into independent organisations that specialise in providing solutions for pension schemes. This group is particularly prevalent in the Netherlands. Leading examples in this group include APG (formerly part of the ABP Pension Fund), Blue Sky Group (originally part of the KLM Pension Fund), MN (formerly part of the PMT Pension Fund) and PGGM (formerly part of the PFWZ Pension Fund).

=== Investment consultants ===
These are commercial organisations that have traditionally offered advisory-only services. Some of those have evolved to offer a 'total solution', including delegated services. Some of these organisations offer their services under the label 'fiduciary management', while others describe their services by alternative labels such as 'implemented consulting', 'delegated consulting' or 'delegated chief investment officer'. Examples in this group are Aon Hewitt, Angeles Investment Advisors, Mercer, River and Mercantile Solutions and Towers Watson.

More information

Anton van Nunen has written a book on Fiduciary Management. More information can be found on The Fiduciary Management Group on LinkedIn.

== See also ==
- Aon Hewitt
- BlackRock
- Goldman Sachs
- MN
- River and Mercantile Solutions
- Robeco
- Russell Investments
- SEI Investments
