= Shareholder primacy =

Concept in corporate governance

Shareholder primacy is a theory in corporate governance holding that shareholder interests should be assigned first priority relative to all other stakeholders. A shareholder primacy approach can give shareholders power to intercede directly and frequently in corporate decision-making, through such means as unilateral shareholder power to amend corporate charters, shareholder referendums on business decisions and regular corporate board election contests.

The shareholder primacy norm was first used by courts to resolve disputes among majority and minority shareholders, and, over time, this use of the shareholder primacy norm evolved into the modern doctrine of minority shareholder oppression.

== Background ==
Shareholder primacy was first articulated in the decision of Dodge v. Ford Motor Co. in 1919. In the Michigan Supreme Court's opinion, it stated that "There should be no confusion... A business corporation is organized and carried on primarily for the profit of the stockholders." It is commonly asserted that the case established a precedent that managers had to maximize shareholder profit, but the status of the court's statement on the topic is disputed, with some legal scholars arguing that it constitutes obiter dicta, or judicial comments that lack binding force.

In their 1932 publication on foundations of United States corporate law and governance—The Modern Corporation and Private Property—Adolf Berle and Gardiner Means's introduced the idea that "shareholders are the corporation's 'true owners'."

In his 1962 book, Capitalism and Freedom, the economist Milton Friedman advanced the theory of shareholder primacy which says that "corporations have no higher purpose than maximizing profits for their shareholders." Friedman said that if corporations were to accept anything but making money for their stockholders as their primary purpose, it would "thoroughly undermine the very foundation of our free society." His article, "A Friedman Doctrine: The Social Responsibility of Business is to Increase Its Profits", was published September 13, 1970, in The New York Times:

In a free-enterprise, private-property system, a corporate executive is an employee of the owners of the business. He has direct responsibility to his employers. That responsibility is to conduct the business in accordance with their desires ... the key point is that, in his capacity as a corporate executive, the manager is the agent of the individuals who own the corporation ... and his primary responsibility is to them.

— Milton Friedman. "A Friedman Doctrine: The Social Responsibility of Business Is to Increase Its Profits". The New York Times. September 13, 1970.

Economist Michael C. Jensen, a former student of Friedman at the University of Chicago, is also widely credited with helping to popularize the idea of shareholder primacy.

The doctrine waned in later years. In March 2009, Jack Welch, known for promoting shareholder primacy during his tenure as CEO of GE, stated in an interview with the Financial Times, "On the face of it, shareholder value is the dumbest idea in the world." In August 2019, the Business Roundtable published its alternative view, focused on long-term benefits for a broad range of "stakeholders."

== See also ==
- Friedman doctrine
- Stakeholder theory
