= Dodge v. Ford Motor Co. =

1919 Michigan Supreme Court case

Decided 1919
- Full case name: John F. Dodge and Horace E. Dodge v. Ford Motor Company et al
- Citation(s): 204 Mich 459; 170 NW 668 (1919)

Court membership
- Judges sitting: Chief Justice John E. Bird, Justices Flavius L. Brooke, Grant Fellows, Frank C. Kuhn, Joseph B. Moore, Russell C. Ostrander, Joseph H. Steere, John W. Stone

Case opinions
- Decision by: Ostrander

Keywords
- Stakeholders; shareholders; directors' duties

Dodge v. Ford Motor Co., 204 Mich 459; 170 NW 668 (1919), is a case in which the Michigan Supreme Court held that Henry Ford had to operate the Ford Motor Company in the interests of its shareholders, rather than for the benefit of his employees or customers. It is often taught as affirming the principle of "shareholder primacy" in corporate America, although its use as a teaching example has received some criticism.

Under some interpretations, the case also affirmed that the business judgment rule that directors may exercise is expansive, leaving Ford and other businesses a wide latitude about how to run the company, if management decisions can point to any rational link to benefiting the corporation as a whole.

As of 2025, in Delaware, the jurisdiction where over half of all U.S. public companies are domiciled, shareholder primacy is still upheld.

== Facts ==
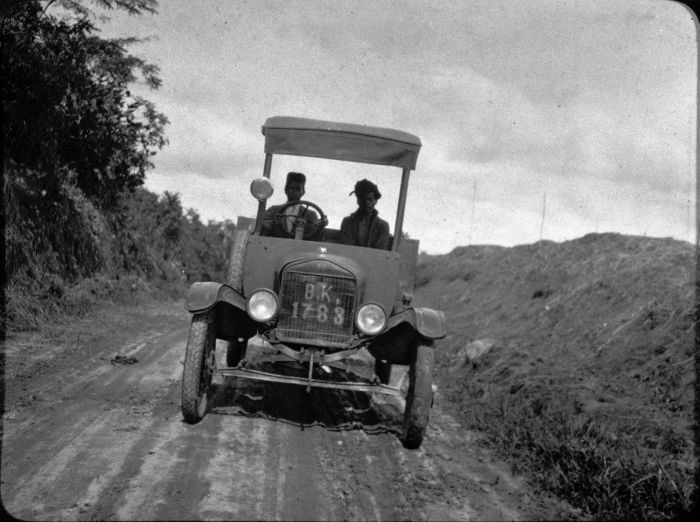
A Ford Model T

By 1916, the Ford Motor Company had accumulated a surplus of $60 million. The price of the Model T, Ford's mainstay product, had been successively cut over the years while the wages of the workers had dramatically, and quite publicly, increased. The company's president and majority stockholder, Henry Ford, sought to end special dividends for shareholders in favor of massive investments in new plants that would enable Ford to dramatically increase production, and the number of people employed at his plants, while continuing to cut the costs and prices of his cars. In public defense of this strategy, Ford declared:

My ambition is to employ still more men, to spread the benefits of this industrial system to the greatest possible number, to help them build up their lives and their homes. To do this we are putting the greatest share of our profits back in the business.

While Ford may have believed that such a strategy might benefit the company in the long term, he told his fellow shareholders that the value of this strategy to them was not a main consideration in his plans. The minority shareholders objected to this strategy, demanding that Ford stop reducing his prices when they could barely fill orders for cars and that he continue paying out special dividends from the capital surplus in lieu of his proposed plant investments. Two brothers, John Francis Dodge and Horace Elgin Dodge, owned 10% of the company, among the largest shareholders next to Ford.

The Court was called upon to decide whether the minority shareholders could prevent Ford from operating the company in the direction that he had declared.

== Judgment ==
The Michigan Supreme Court held that Ford was required to pay a dividend. Notably, an obiter dictum (non-binding remark) in the opinion, written by Russell C. Ostrander, argued that the profits to the stockholders should be the primary concern for the company directors. Because the company was in business for profit, Ford could not turn it into a charity. This was compared to a spoliation of the company's assets. The court therefore upheld the order of the trial court requiring that directors declare an extra dividend of $19.3 million. It said the following:

A business corporation is organized and carried on primarily for the profit of the stockholders. The powers of the directors are to be employed for that end. The discretion of directors is to be exercised in the choice of men to attain that end and does not extend to a change in the end itself, to the reduction of profits or to the nondistribution of profits among stockholders in order to devote them to other purposes.

— Dodge, 204 Mich. at 507.

== Significance ==
As a direct result of this decision, Henry Ford threatened to set up a competing manufacturer as a way to finally compel his adversaries to sell back their shares to him. Subsequently, the money that the Dodge brothers received from the case would be used to expand the Dodge Brothers Company.

Ford was also motivated by a desire to squeeze out his minority shareholders, especially the Dodge brothers, whom he suspected (correctly) of using their Ford dividends to build a rival car company. By cutting off their dividends, Ford hoped to starve the Dodges of capital to fuel their growth. In that context, the Dodge decision is viewed as a mixed result for both sides of the dispute. Ford was denied the ability to arbitrarily undermine the profitability of the firm, and thereby eliminate future dividends. Under the upheld business judgment rule, however, Ford was given considerable leeway via control of his board about what investments he could make. That left him with considerable influence over dividends, but not complete control as he wished.

This case is frequently cited as support for the idea that US corporate law requires boards of directors to maximize shareholder wealth. However, one view is that this interpretation has not represented the law in most states for some time:

Among non-experts, conventional wisdom holds that corporate law requires boards of directors to maximize shareholder wealth. This common but mistaken belief is almost invariably supported by reference to the Michigan Supreme Court's 1919 opinion in Dodge v. Ford Motor Co.

— Lynn Stout

Dodge is often misread or mistaught as setting a legal rule of shareholder wealth maximization. This was not and is not the law. Shareholder wealth maximization is a standard of conduct for officers and directors, not a legal mandate. The business judgment rule [which was also upheld in this decision] protects many decisions that deviate from this standard. This is one reading of Dodge. If this is all the case is about, however, it isn't that interesting.

— M. Todd Henderson

However, others, while agreeing that the case did not invent the idea of shareholder wealth maximization, found that it was an accurate statement of the law, in that "corporate officers and directors have a duty to manage the corporation for the purpose of maximizing profits for the benefit of shareholders" is a default legal rule, and that the reason that "Dodge v. Ford is a rule that is hardly ever enforced by courts" is not that it represents bad case law, but because the business judgement rule means:

The rule of wealth maximization for shareholders is virtually impossible to enforce as a practical matter. The rule is aspirational, except in odd cases. As long as corporate directors and CEOs claim to be maximizing profits for shareholders, they will be taken at their word, because it is impossible to refute these corporate officials' self-serving assertions about their motives.

— Jonathan Macey

== See also ==
- Benefit corporation
- Corporate social responsibility
- Grimshaw v. Ford Motor Co.
