= Irwin Russell =

American lawyer

- Born: January 24, 1926
- Died: August 23, 2013
- Education: Harvard Law School
- Occupation: Entertainment lawyer

Irwin E. Russell (January 24, 1926 - August 23, 2013) was an American entertainment lawyer, whose clients included Dr. Seuss, Michael Eisner, Jim Henson, David Wolper, Christina Crawford and Robert Preston. Russell was a leading attorney behind the 1984 takeover of The Walt Disney Company and the accession of Michael Eisner as the CEO of Disney. Prior to this, Russell negotiated deals which brought Candid Camera to television and Jim Henson's Muppets to Sesame Street.

Russell was born on January 24, 1926. He received a Juris Doctor from Harvard Law School in 1949. He worked in private practice in New York City. Russell had also served on the National Wage Stabilization Board, based in Washington D.C.

Russell moved to Los Angeles in 1971. One of Russell's best known clients was Michael Eisner, whom he represented for more than forty years from Eisner's time at ABC, Paramount, and Disney. He continued to represent Eisner at The Tornante Company until his death in August 2013. In 1984, Russell negotiated the deal which brought Eisner to Disney as the company's CEO. Irwin Russell then served on the board of directors of The Walt Disney Company.

Irwin Russell died of complications from leukemia on August 23, 2013, at the age of 87. He was survived by his wife, Suzanne.
