= Dorchester Finance Co Ltd v Stebbing =

Dorchester Finance Co v Stebbing, [1989] BCLC 498, is a UK company law case under the wrongful trading provision of the Insolvency Act 1986 s.214. The director of a company must act in good faith and in the interests of the company, he must display such skill as may reasonably be expected of a person with his knowledge and experience, and he must at all times take such care as a prudent man would take on his own behalf.

== Facts ==
Dorchester Finance, which had gone insolvent, made a claim against Mr Stebbing and two other non-executive director accountants who often signed blank cheques which were later countersigned by Mr Stebbing.

== Judgment ==
Foster J held that directors of a company were bound to act in good faith and in the interests of the company. They also had to display such skill and care as should be reasonably expected from people with their knowledge and experience. The system of signing blank cheques was held to be negligent, and liable for losses.

Furthermore, no distinction should be drawn in principle between an executive and a non-executive director.

Foster J held further that it would not be appropriate for the court to exercise its discretion to relieve the three directors on the basis that they acted "honestly and reasonably".
