= Cook v Deeks =

Canadian company law case

- Court: Judicial Committee of the Privy Council
- Full case name: A. B. Cook v George S. Deeks and others
- Decided: 23 February 1916
- Citation: [1916] 1 AC 554, [1916] UKPC 10

Case history
- Appealed from: Ontario Court of Appeal

Court membership
- Judges sitting: Lord Buckmaster LC; Viscount Haldane; Lord Parker of Waddington; Lord Sumner

Case opinions
- Decision by: Lord Buckmaster LC

Keywords
- Corporate opportunity, conflict of interest

Cook v Deeks [1916] UKPC 10 is a Canadian company law case, relevant also to UK company law, concerning the illegitimate diversion of a corporate opportunity. It was decided by the Judicial Committee of the Privy Council, at that time the court of last resort within the British Empire, on appeal from the Appellate Division of the Supreme Court of Ontario, Canada.

Because decisions of the Judicial Committee have persuasive value in the United Kingdom, even when decided under the law of another member of the Commonwealth, this decision has been followed in the United Kingdom courts. In UK company law, the case would now be seen as falling within the Companies Act 2006 section 175, with a failure to have ratification of breach by independent shareholders under section 239.

== Facts ==
The Toronto Construction Co. had four directors, GM Deeks, GS Deeks, Hinds, and Cook. It helped in the construction of railways in Canada. The first three directors wanted to exclude Cook from the business. Each held a quarter of the company's shares. GM Deeks, GS Deeks, and Hinds took a contract with the Canadian Pacific Railway Company (for building a line at the Guelph Junction and Hamilton branch) in their own names. They then passed a shareholder resolution declaring that the company had no interest in the contract. Cook claimed that the contract did belong to the Toronto Construction Co and the shareholder resolution ratifying their actions should not be valid because the three directors used their votes to carry it.

== Decision ==
The Privy Council advised that the three directors had breached their duty of loyalty to the company, that the shareholder ratification was a fraud on Mr Cook as a minority shareholder, and invalid. Giving the advice, The Lord Chancellor, Lord Buckmaster held the result was that the profits made on the contractual opportunity were to be held on trust for the Toronto Construction Co.

Lord Buckmaster said that the three had,

deliberately designed to exclude and used their influence and position to exclude, the company whose interest it was their first duty to protect... the benefit of such contract... must be regarded as held on behalf of the company... it appears quite certain that directors holding a majority of votes would not be permitted to make a present to themselves. This would be to allow a majority to oppress the minority....if directors have acquired for themselves property or rights which they must be regarded as holding on behalf of the company, a resolution that the rights of the company should be disregarded in the matter would amount to forfeiting the interest and property of the minority of shareholders in favour of the majority, and that by the votes of those who are interested in securing the property for themselves. Such use of voting power has never been sanctioned by the Courts

== See also ==
- UK company law
