= Canadian Aero Service Ltd v O'Malley =

- Supreme Court of Canada

Hearing: May 11, 12, 15, 16, 24, and 25, 1972 Judgment: June 29, 1973
- Full case name: Canadian Aero Service Limited v Thomas M. O'Malley, J. M. (George) Zarzycki, James E. Wells, Terra Surveys Limited
- Citations: [1974] SCR 592
- Prior history: Judgement against Canadian Aero Service Ltd. in the Court of Appeal for Ontario.
- Ruling: Appeal allowed in the cases of O'Malley, Zarzycki, and Terra Surveys Ltd.; appeal dismissed in case of Wells.

Holding
- Senior officers in a subsidiary company still have a fiduciary duty to the controlling corporation.

Court membership
- Chief Justice: Gérald Fauteux; Puisne Justices: Douglas Abbott, Ronald Martland, Wilfred Judson, Roland Ritchie, Emmett Hall, Wishart Spence, Louis-Philippe Pigeon, Bora Laskin

Reasons given
- Unanimous reasons by: Laskin J
- Fauteux CJ and Abbott, Hall and Pigeon JJ took no part in the consideration or decision of the case.

Canadian Aero Service Ltd v O'Malley, [1974] SCR 592, is a leading civil case decided by the Supreme Court of Canada on corporate director and officer liability.

== Facts ==
Canadian Aero Service Ltd. ("Canaero") was a company whose main business was topographical mapping and geophysical exploration. O'Malley and Zarzycki were senior officers of Canaero, and, together with Wells, were directors of the company. After the acquisition of Canaero's parent by Litton Industries in 1961, Wells resigned as director in February 1965. O'Malley and Zarzycki resigned from their positions in August 1966. Wells was aware the latter were discontented at Canaero by reason of the limitations upon their authority and the scope of independent action imposed by the Litton company, and they also feared loss of position if Canaero should fail to get contracts.

Prior to their resignation, at the suggestion of Wells, the three decided to form a business venture in the same fields as Canaero. It was incorporated as Terra Surveys Limited in September 1966. In that month, Terra was chosen to receive a contract to perform a topographical survey and related mapping for the government of Guyana, and the agreement was executed in November 1966. The proposal upon which the contract was granted was based on preparatory work that had been performed by O'Malley and Zarzycki for Canaero prior to their resignations.

Canaero filed a claim against the three (together with Terra) on the basis that the defendants had improperly taken the fruits of a corporate opportunity in which Canaero had a prior and continuing interest.

== The issues ==
- the determination of the relationship of O'Malley and Zarzycki to Canaero
- the duty or duties, if any, owed by them to Canaero by reason of the ascertained relationship
- whether there has been any breach of duty, if any is owing, by reason of the conduct of O'Malley and Zarzycki in acting through Terra to secure the contract for the Guyana project
- the question of liability for breach of duty if established

== The judgments below ==
In the Supreme Court of Ontario, it was held that, while O'Malley and Zarzycki, as corporate officers, had fiduciary obligations to Canaero, such obligations did not apply in this case. As the trial judge (Grant J) said,

I do not interpret the decision above quoted as indicating that the mere fact of learning of the contract or even doing extensive work and preparation in attempts to secure the same for the plaintiff while they were still in their offices for it, of itself prevents them, after severing relations with their employer, from seeking to acquire it for themselves. It is not the coming upon or learning of the proposed contract while directors that establishes liability, but rather obtaining the same because of such fiduciary position and in the course of their duties as such. I would think that when directors or senior officers leave the employ of the company they must not use confidential information which they have acquired in such employment for the purpose of assisting them in getting such a contract for themselves. Such information so acquired by them would remain an asset of their principal even after they had left their employment.

The judgment was affirmed on appeal to the Court of Appeal for Ontario, but it was held O'Malley and Zarzycki did not have fiduciary obligations to Canaero. Instead, the relationship was simply that of employees and employer, involving no corresponding fiduciary obligations and, apart from valid contractual restriction, no limitation upon post-employment competition save as to appropriation of trade secrets and enticement of customers.

== Decision of the Supreme Court of Canada ==
Appeal was allowed for all but one of the defendants.

The Court held that anyone in a supervisory or controlling role of a company has a fiduciary duty towards the company which includes the duties of "loyalty, good faith and avoidance of a conflict of duty and self-interest".

As the court noted,

Like Grant J., the trial judge, I do not think it matters whether O'Malley and Zarzycki were properly appointed as directors of Canaero or whether they did or did not act as directors. What is not in doubt is that they acted respectively as president and executive vice-president of Canaero for about two years prior to their resignations. To paraphrase the findings of the trial judge in this respect, they acted in those positions and their remuneration and responsibilities verified their status as senior officers of Canaero. They were "top management" and not mere employees whose duty to their employer, unless enlarged by contract, consisted only of respect for trade secrets and for confidentiality of customer lists. Theirs was a larger, more exacting duty which, unless modified by statute or by contract (and there is nothing of this sort here), was similar to that owed to a corporate employer by its directors. I adopt what is said on this point by Gower, Principles of Modern Company Law, 3rd ed., 1969, at p. 518 as follows:

... these duties, except in so far as they depend on statutory provisions expressly limited to directors, are not so restricted but apply equally to any officials of the company who are authorized to act on its behalf, and in particular to those acting in a managerial capacity.

The distinction taken between agents and servants of an employer is apt here, and I am unable to appreciate the basis upon which the Ontario Court of Appeal concluded that O'Malley and Zarzycki were mere employees, that is servants of Canaero rather than agents. Although they were subject to supervision of the officers of the controlling company, their positions as senior officers of a subsidiary, which was a working organization, charged them with initiatives and with responsibilities far removed from the obedient role of servants.

It follows that O'Malley and Zarzycki stood in a fiduciary relationship to Canaero, which in its generality betokens loyalty, good faith and avoidance of a conflict of duty and self-interest. Descending from the generality, the fiduciary relationship goes at least this far: a director or a senior officer like O'Malley or Zarzycki is precluded from obtaining for himself, either secretly or without the approval of the company (which would have to be properly manifested upon full disclosure of the facts), any property or business advantage either belonging to the company or for which it has been negotiating; and especially is this so where the director or officer is a participant in the negotiations on behalf of the company.

...

In holding that on the facts found by the trial judge, there was a breach of fiduciary duty by O'Malley and Zarzycki which survived their resignations I am not to be taken as laying down any rule of liability to be read as if it were a statute. The general standards of loyalty, good faith and avoidance of a conflict of duty and self-interest to which the conduct of a director or senior officer must conform, must be tested in each case by many factors which it would be reckless to attempt to enumerate exhaustively. Among them are the factor of position or office held, the nature of the corporate opportunity, its ripeness, its specificness and the director's or managerial officer's relation to it, the amount of knowledge possessed, the circumstances in which it was obtained and whether it was special or, indeed, even private, the factor of time in the continuation of fiduciary duty where the alleged breach occurs after termination of the relationship with the company, and the circumstances under which the relationship was terminated, that is whether by retirement or resignation or discharge.

Wells stands on a different footing from O'Malley and Zarzycki. The case put against Wells in the submissions to this Court is not that he personally owed a fiduciary duty to Canaero in respect of the Guyana project from the time it took shape but rather that he was a party to a conspiracy with O'Malley and Zarzycki to convert Canaero's business opportunity in respect of the Guyana project to personal benefit in breach of fiduciary obligation. Although Wells was associated with his co-defendants beyond the role of their solicitor, and was a director and substantial shareholder of Survair Limited, which was among the original intended invitees to submit proposals for the Guyana project but was dropped when the formal invitations were issued, there is no reason to interfere with the concurrent findings of fact upon which the action against Wells was dismissed and the dismissal affirmed on appeal. Unlike the case with O'Malley and Zarzycki, the findings of fact do not admit of a conclusion of law by which to fix Wells with liability.

There remains the question of the appropriate relief against O'Malley and Zarzycki, and against Terra through which they acted in breach of fiduciary duty. In fixing the damages at $125,000, the trial judge based himself on a claim for damages related only to the loss of the contract for the Guyana project, this being the extent of Canaero's claim as he understood it. No claim for a different amount or for relief on a different basis, as, for example, to hold Terra as constructive trustee for Canaero in respect of the execution of the Guyana contract, was made in this Court. Counsel for the respondents, although conceding that there was evidence of Terra's likely profit from the Guyana contract, emphasized the trial judge's finding that Canaero could not have obtained the contract itself in view of its association with Spartan Air Services Limited in the submission of a proposal. It was his submission that there was no evidence that that proposal would have been accepted if Terra's had been rejected and, in any event, there was no evidence of Canaero's likely share of the profit.

Liability of O'Malley and Zarzycki for breach of fiduciary duty does not depend upon proof by Canaero that, but for their intervention, it would have obtained the Guyana contract; nor is it a condition of recovery of damages that Canaero establish what its profit would have been or what it has lost by failing to realize the corporate opportunity in question. It is entitled to compel the faithless fiduciaries to answer for their default according to their gain. Whether the damages awarded here be viewed as an accounting of profits or, what amounts to the same thing, as based on unjust enrichment, I would not interfere with the quantum. The appeal is, accordingly, allowed against all defendants save Wells, and judgment should be entered against them for $125,000. The appellant should have its costs against them throughout. I would dismiss the appeal as against Wells with costs.

== Significance ==
The case significantly extended the reach of fiduciary duties that had been previously recognized in Canadian law by Peso Silver Mines Ltd v Cropper, which had adopted the principles of Regal (Hastings) Ltd v Gulliver. These principles have been furthered in subsequent cases, most notably in Peoples Department Stores Inc (Trustee of) v Wise.

Aero Service and Peso Silver Mines continue to illustrate the boundaries of conflict of interest that directors of Canadian companies must keep in mind in their deliberations.
