= Duty of care (business associations) =

Part of United States law

In United States corporation and business association law (particularly Delaware law and the Revised Model Business Corporation Act), a duty of care is part of the fiduciary duty owed to a corporation by its directors. The other aspects of fiduciary duty are a director's duty of loyalty and (possibly) duty of good faith.

Put simply, a director owes a duty to exercise good business judgment and to use ordinary care and prudence in the operation of the business. They must discharge their actions in good faith and in the best interest of the corporation, exercising the care an ordinary person would use under similar circumstances.

Directors' decisions are typically protected under the business judgment rule, unless they breach one of these duties or unless the decision constitutes waste. A breach of fiduciary duty will typically remove a director's decision from business judgment protection and require that the director show entire fairness.

== Waste ==
Directors have a duty not to waste corporate assets by overpaying for property or employment services. Thus the definition of waste is an exchange so one-sided that no business person of ordinary, sound judgment could conclude the corporation has received adequate consideration. This is difficult to prove in a court of law.

== Case law ==
The duty of care has been set out or clarified in a number of decisions. Among the important duty of care cases are:

Smith v. Van Gorkom (setting out duty to be reasonably informed in decision-making). In this decision, a standard of gross negligence was used, which is defined as “reckless indifference to or a deliberate disregard of the whole body of stockholders or actions which are without the bounds of reason.” In the case of Van Gorkom, a share price was set for a company buyout with essentially no consideration, this meeting the standard of gross negligence in informed decision making. Thus, the Duty of Care certainly involves informing oneself prior to making decisions.

Caremark, Unocal Corp. v. Mesa Petroleum Co., Revlon, Inc. v. MacAndrews & Forbes Holdings, Inc. (setting out duty of supervision and knowledge of company finances).

Francis V. United Jersey Bank (emphasizing monitoring as a part of the duty of care). In this case, a woman was given control of an implied trust as a result of her husband's death. Thus, she assumed the role of director. During her time as director, her sons stole millions of dollars from the trust. The courts stated that she breached her duty of care because she failed to monitor what was happening within her organization. Thus, monitoring activity within an organization is part of the fiduciary duty of care.

== Statutes ==
The Duty of Care is set out in the Model Business Corporation act sections 8.30 and 8.31. There is no statutory codification of the Duty of Care in the Delaware General Corporation Law.

== Exculpation ==
Both Delaware and the Model Act allow for directors to be exculpated for some breaches of the duty of care. The exculpation provisions are found in Delaware General Corporate Law section 102(b)(7) and in Model Act section 2.02(b)(4).

== Criticisms ==
It is difficult for a director to be found in breach of this duty as the business judgment presumption insulates directors from much of their liability. There is little accountability for corporate directors to shareholders, although some still exists.

As an example, a director for Disney was let go after 14 months of work with about $150MM in compensation, more than his entire employment contract. In Brehm v. Eisner, a Delaware Supreme Court decision from 2000, the Court found that the Business Judgment Rule shielded the Board, which the Court found to have exercised bad business judgment, since it essentially complied with the Van Gorkom procedural requirement of informing themselves via an expert before approving the severance package. Thus the rule seems to protect even terrible business decisions from judicial review.

The counterargument is that shareholders are free to sell their stocks in the open market. Of course, some bad business decisions by the board may well affect the shareholders' ability to do so. Note, however, that this case was decided under Delaware's rather extreme codification of the Business Judgment Rule, §102(b)(7), which allows the Corporation to shield its board members from liability for almost anything short of outright bad faith.
