= Re Barings plc (No 5) =

UK company law case concerning duties of care and skill of directors

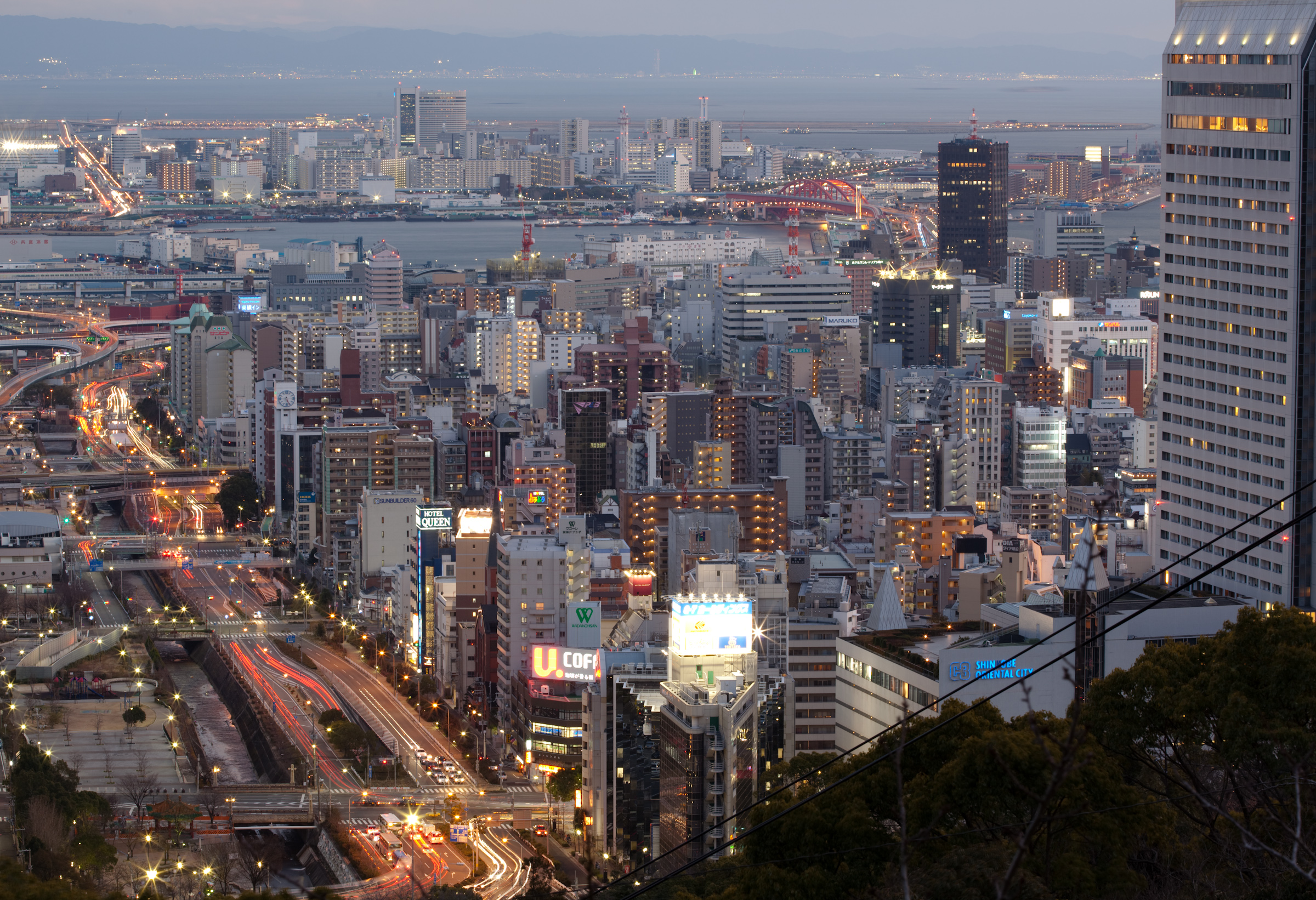
- Court: Court of Appeal
- Full case name: Secretary of State for Trade and Industry v Baker (No.5)
- Citation: [2000] 1 BCLC 523

Case history
- Prior action: [1999] 1 BCLC 433

Court membership
- Judges sitting: Morritt LJ; Waller LJ; Mummery LJ

Case opinions
- Morritt LJ

Keywords
- Care and skill, Directors' duties

Re Barings plc (No 5) [2000] 1 BCLC 523 is a leading UK company law case, concerning company directors' duties of care and skill. The case is formally identified and cited as "No 5", though some observers regard it as the sixth in the saga of litigation concerning Barings Bank.

== Facts ==
Nick Leeson was a dishonest futures trader in Singapore for Barings Bank. He traded in the front office and also worked—in breach of internal audit recommendations—in the back office, auditing his own team's trades, effectively allowing him to act as his own supervisor. Leeson abused this situation secretly to make increasingly large unauthorized trades on his employer's behalf. He fraudulently doctored the bank's accounts, and reported large profits, while trading at a loss. After the 1995 Kobe earthquake, the stock market went into a downward spiral, and the truth of his losses was uncovered, bankrupting Barings. The Secretary of State sought director disqualification orders under the Company Directors Disqualification Act 1986 against three directors of Barings for their failure to supervise his activities. They were alleged to be incompetent, and therefore "unfit to be concerned in the management of a company" (sections 6–8).

== Judgement ==
=== High Court ===
Jonathan Parker J held that the three directors should be disqualified. Unfitness was determined by the objective standard that should ordinarily be expected of people fit to be directors of companies. Directors must inform themselves of company affairs and join in with other directors to supervise those affairs. Having no adequate system of monitoring was therefore a breach of this standard. Directors may delegate functions, but they nevertheless remain responsible for those functions being carried out. Furthermore, the degree of a director's remuneration will be a relevant factor in determining the degree of responsibility with which a director must reckon.

=== Court of Appeal ===
Morritt LJ, Waller LJ and Mummery LJ upheld Jonathan Parker J's decision in full. Morritt LJ delivered judgment for the whole court.

== See also ==
- UK company law
- US corporate law
- Gross negligence
- Business judgment rule
