= Fiduciary =

Person who holds a legal or ethical relationship of trust

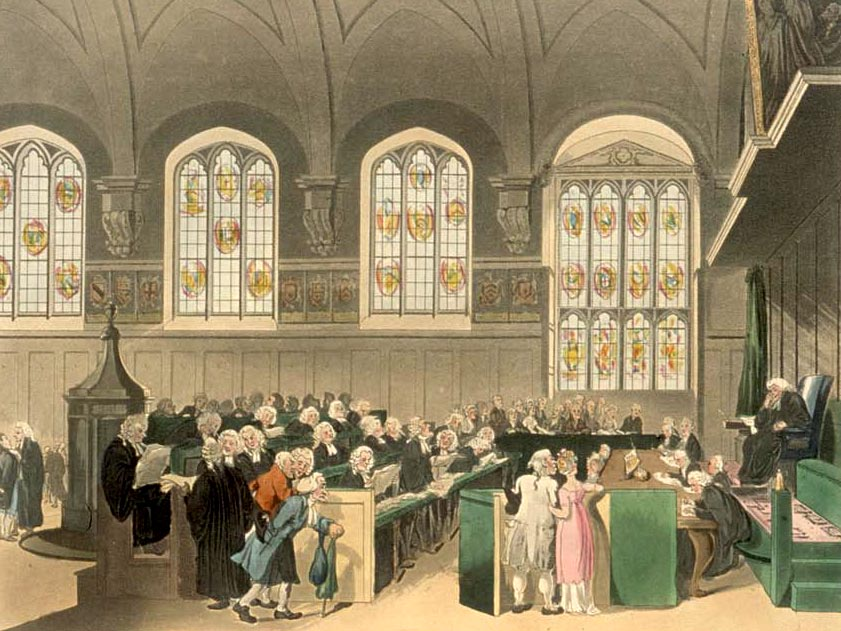
The Court of Chancery, which governed fiduciary relations in England prior to the Judicature Acts

A fiduciary is a person who holds a legal or ethical relationship of trust with one or more other parties (legal person or group of persons). Typically, a fiduciary prudently takes care of money or other assets for another person. One party, for example, a corporate trust company or the trust department of a bank, acts in a fiduciary capacity to another party, who has entrusted funds to the fiduciary for safekeeping or investment. Likewise, financial advisers, financial planners, and asset managers, including managers of pension plans, endowments, and other tax-exempt assets, are considered fiduciaries under applicable statutes and laws. In a fiduciary relationship, one person, in a position of vulnerability, justifiably vests confidence, good faith, reliance, and trust in another whose aid, advice, or protection is sought in some matter. In such a relation, good conscience requires the fiduciary to act at all times for the sole benefit and interest of the one who trusts.

A fiduciary is someone who has undertaken to act for and on behalf of another in a particular matter in circumstances which give rise to a relationship of trust and confidence.

— Lord Millett, Bristol and West Building Society v Mothew

Fiduciary duties in a financial sense exist to ensure that those who manage other people's money act in their beneficiaries' interests, rather than serving their own interests.

A fiduciary duty is the highest standard of care in equity or law. A fiduciary is expected to be extremely loyal to the person to whom he owes the duty (the "principal") such that there must be no conflict of duty between fiduciary and principal, and the fiduciary must not profit from their position as a fiduciary, unless the principal consents. The nature of fiduciary obligations differs among jurisdictions. In Australia, only proscriptive or negative fiduciary obligations are recognised, whereas in Canada, fiduciaries can come under both proscriptive (negative) and prescriptive (positive) fiduciary obligations.

In English common law, the fiduciary relationship is an important concept within a part of the legal system known as equity. In the United Kingdom, the Judicature Acts merged the courts of equity (historically based in England's Court of Chancery) with the courts of common law, and as a result the concept of fiduciary duty also became applicable in common law courts.

When a fiduciary duty is imposed, equity requires a different, stricter standard of behavior than the comparable tortious duty of care in common law. The fiduciary has a duty not to be in a situation where personal interests and fiduciary duty conflict, not to be in a situation where their fiduciary duty conflicts with another fiduciary duty, and a duty not to profit from their fiduciary position without knowledge and consent. A fiduciary ideally would not have a conflict of interest. It has been said that fiduciaries must conduct themselves "at a level higher than that trodden by the crowd" and that "[t]he distinguishing or overriding duty of a fiduciary is the obligation of undivided loyalty".

== In different jurisdictions ==
Different jurisdictions regard fiduciary duties in different lights. Canadian law, for example, has developed a more expansive view of fiduciary obligation than American law, while Australian law and British law have developed more conservative approaches than either the United States or Canada. In Australia, it has been found that there is no comprehensive list of criteria by which to establish a fiduciary relationship. Courts have so far refused to define the concept of a fiduciary, instead preferring to develop the law on a case-by-case basis and by way of analogy. Fiduciary relationships are of different types and carry different obligations so that a test appropriate to determine whether a fiduciary relationship exists for one purpose might be inappropriate for another:

In 2014, the Law Commission (England and Wales) reviewed the fiduciary duties of investment intermediaries, with particular focus on the duties owed by pension trustees. They commented that the term "fiduciary" is used in many different ways.

Fiduciary duties cannot be understood in isolation. Instead they are better viewed as 'legal polyfilla', molding themselves flexibly around other legal structures, and sometimes filling the gaps.

— Law Commission (England and Wales) Fiduciary Duties of Investment Intermediaries Law Com 350, para 3.11

The question of who is a fiduciary is a "notoriously intractable" question, and this was the first of many questions. In SEC v. Chenery Corporation, Frankfurter J said,

To say that a man is a fiduciary only begins the analysis; it gives direction to further inquiry. To whom is he a fiduciary? What obligations does he owe as a fiduciary? In what respect has he failed to discharge these obligations? And what are the consequences of his deviation from his duty?

The law expressed here follows the general body of elementary fiduciary law found in most common-law jurisdictions; for in-depth analysis of particular jurisdictional idiosyncrasies, please consult primary authorities in the relevant jurisdiction.

This is especially true in the area of Labor and Employment law. In Canada a fiduciary has obligations to the employer even after the employment relationship is terminated, whereas in the United States the employment and fiduciary relationships terminate together.

== Fiduciary duties under Delaware corporate law ==
The corporate law of Delaware is the most influential in the United States, as more than 50% of publicly traded companies in the United States, including 64% of the Fortune 500, have chosen to incorporate in that state. Under Delaware law, officers, directors and other control persons of corporations and other entities owe three primary fiduciary duties, (1) the duty of care, (2) the duty of loyalty and (3) the duty of good faith.

The duty of care requires control persons to act on an informed basis after due consideration of all information. The duty includes a requirement that such persons reasonably inform themselves of alternatives. In doing so, they may rely on employees and other advisers so long as they do so with a critical eye and do not unquestionably accept the information and conclusions provided to them. Under normal circumstances, their actions are accorded the protection of the business judgment rule, which presumes that control persons acted properly, provided that they act on an informed basis, in good faith and in the honest belief that the action taken was in the best interests of the company.

The duty of loyalty requires controlling persons to look to the interests of the company and its other owners, not their personal interests. In general, they cannot use their positions of trust, confidence and inside knowledge to further their own private interests or approve an action that will provide them with a personal benefit (such as continued employment) that does not primarily benefit the company or its other owners.

The duty of good faith requires control persons to exercise care and prudence in making business decisions—that is, the care that a reasonably prudent person in a similar position would use under similar circumstances. Control persons fail to act in good faith, even if their actions are not illegal, when they take actions for improper purposes or, in certain circumstances, when their actions have grossly inequitable results. The duty to act in good faith is an obligation not only to make decisions free from self-interest but also free from any interest that diverts controlling persons from acting in the best interests of the company. The duty to act in good faith may be measured by an individual's particular knowledge and expertise. The higher the level of expertise, the more accountable that person will be (e.g., a finance expert may be held to a more exacting standard than others in accepting a third-party valuation).

At one time, courts seemed to view the duty of good faith as an independent obligation. However, more recently, courts have treated the duty of good faith as a component of the duty of loyalty.

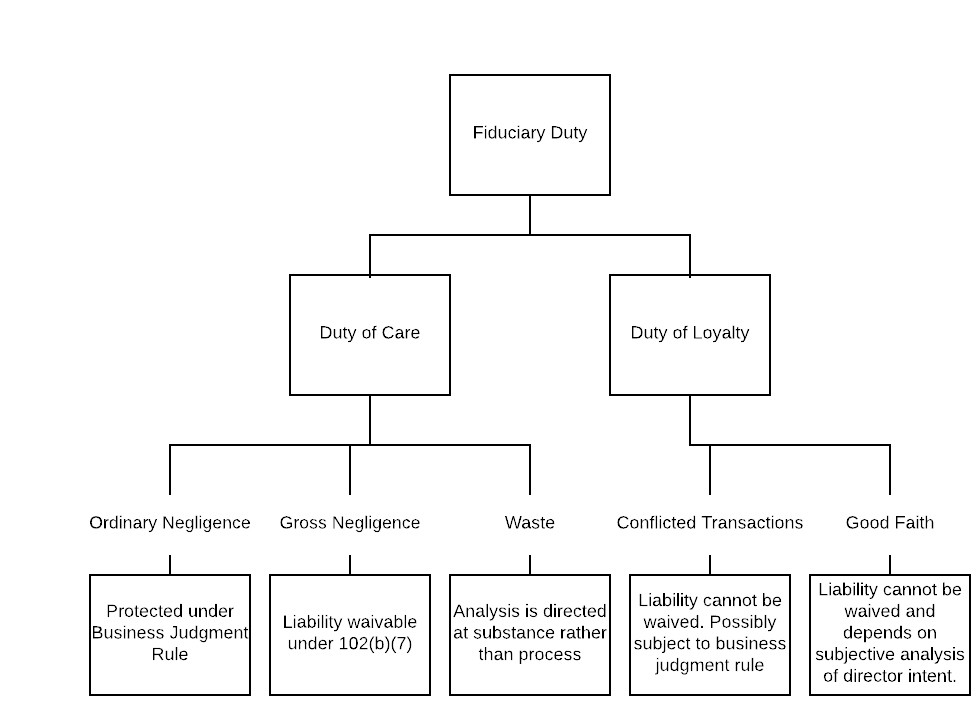
Diagram illustrating fiduciary duty, placing good faith within duty of loyalty

== Fiduciary duty in Canadian corporate law ==
In Canada, directors of corporations owe a fiduciary duty. A debate exists as to the nature and extent of this duty following a controversial landmark judgment from the Supreme Court of Canada in BCE Inc. v. 1976 Debentureholders. Scholarly literature has defined this as a "tripartite fiduciary duty", composed of (1) an overarching duty to the corporation, which contains two component duties—(2) a duty to protect shareholder interests from harm, and (3) a procedural duty of "fair treatment" for relevant stakeholder interests. This tripartite structure encapsulates the duty of directors to act in the "best interests of the corporation, viewed as a good corporate citizen".

== Relationships ==
The most common circumstance where a fiduciary duty will arise is between a trustee, whether real or juristic, and a beneficiary. The trustee to whom property is legally committed is the legal—i.e., common law—owner of all such property. The beneficiary, at law, has no legal title to the trust; however, the trustee is bound by equity to suppress their own interests and administer the property only for the benefit of the beneficiary. In this way, the beneficiary obtains the use of property without being its technical owner.

Others, such as corporate directors, may be held to a fiduciary duty similar in some respects to that of a trustee. This happens when, for example, the directors of a bank are trustees for the depositors, the directors of a corporation are trustees for the stockholders, or a guardian is trustee of their ward's property. A person in a sensitive position sometimes protects themselves from possible conflict-of-interest charges by setting up a blind trust, placing their financial affairs in the hands of a fiduciary and giving up all right to know about or to intervene in their handling.

The fiduciary functions of trusts and agencies are commonly performed by a trust company, such as a commercial bank, organized for that purpose. In the United States, the Office of the Comptroller of the Currency (OCC), an agency of the United States Department of the Treasury, is the primary regulator of the fiduciary activities of federal savings associations.

When a court desires to hold the offending party to a transaction responsible so as to prevent unjust enrichment, the judge can declare that a fiduciary relation exists between the parties, as though the offender were in fact a trustee for the partner.

Relationships which routinely attract by law a fiduciary duty between certain classes of persons include these:

- Trustee/beneficiary;
- Conservators and legal guardians/wards;
- Agents, attorney in fact usually from written grant of authority by principal, brokers and factors/principals;
- Buyer agent (real estate broker)/buyer client;
- Confidential advisor including financial adviser and investment advisor/advisee or client;
- Lawyer/client (a solicitor is presumed to have a fiduciary duty);
- Executors and administrators/legatees and heirs;
- Corporate partners, joint venturers, directors and officers/company and stockholders;
- Board of directors / legal persons, including companies;
- Partner/partner;
- Senior employee/company;
- Retirement plan administrators (including 401(k) plans)/retirees and workers;
- Retirement account advisors;
- Promoters/company and related subscribers;
- Liquidator/company;
- Mutual savings banks and investment corporations/their depositors and investors;
- Receivers, trustees in bankruptcy and assignees in insolvency/creditors;
- Governments / indigenous peoples (see e.g. Seminole Nation v. United States);
- Doctor/patient—in Canada, not in Australia;
- Guardian/ward;
- Teacher/student;
- Priest/parishioner seeking counseling.

In Australia, the categories of fiduciary relationships are not closed.

Roman and civil law recognized a type of contract called fiducia (also contractus fiduciae or fiduciary contract), involving essentially a sale to a person coupled with an agreement that the purchaser should sell the property back upon the fulfillment of certain conditions. Such contracts were used in the emancipation of children, in connection with testamentary gifts and in pledges. Under Roman law a woman could arrange a fictitious sale called a fiduciary coemption in order to change her guardian or gain legal capacity to make a will.

In Roman Dutch law, a fiduciary heir may receive property subject to passing it to another on fulfillment of certain conditions; the gift is called a fideicommissum. The fiduciary of a fideicommissum is a fideicommissioner and one that receives property from a fiduciary heir is a fideicommissary heir.

Fiduciary principles may be applied in a variety of legal contexts.

=== Possible relationships ===
Joint ventures, as opposed to business partnerships, are not presumed to carry a fiduciary duty; however, this is a matter of degree. If a joint venture is conducted at commercial arm's length and both parties are on an equal footing, then the courts will be reluctant to find a fiduciary duty, but if the joint venture is carried out more in the manner of a partnership, then fiduciary relationships can and often will arise.

Husbands and wives are not 'presumed' to be in a fiduciary relationship in many jurisdictions; however, this may be readily established. Similarly, ordinary commercial transactions are not, in themselves, 'presumed' to be fiduciary, but can give rise to fiduciary duties should the appropriate circumstances arise. These are usually circumstances where the contract specifies a degree of trust and loyalty, or it can be inferred by the court.

Australian courts also do not recognize parents and their children as being in fiduciary relationships. In contrast, the Supreme Court of Canada allowed a child to sue her father for damages for breach of his fiduciary duties, opening the door in Canada for allowing fiduciary obligations between parent and child to be recognised.

Australian courts have also not accepted doctor-patient relationships as fiduciary in nature. In Breen v Williams, the High Court viewed the doctor's responsibilities over their patients as lacking the representative capacity of the trustee in fiduciary relationships. Moreover, the existence of remedies in contract and tort made the Court reluctant to recognize the fiduciary relationship.

In 2011, in an insider trading case, the U.S. Securities and Exchange Commission brought charges against a boyfriend of a Disney intern, alleging that he owed his girlfriend a fiduciary duty and breached it. The boyfriend, Toby Scammell, allegedly received and used insider information on Disney's takeover of Marvel Comics.

Generally, the employment relationship is not regarded as fiduciary, but may be so if

... within a particular contractual relationship there are specific contractual obligations which the employee has undertaken which have placed him in a situation where equity imposes these rigorous duties in addition to the contractual obligations. Although terminologies like duty of good faith, or loyalty, or the mutual duty of trust and confidence are frequently used to describe employment relationships, such concepts usually denote situations where "a party merely has to take into consideration the interests of another, but does not have to act in the interests of that other.

If fiduciary relationships are to arise between employers and employees, it is necessary to ascertain that the employee has placed himself in a position where he must act solely in the interests of his employer. In the case of Canadian Aero Service Ltd v O'Malley, it was held that a senior employee is much more likely to be found to owe fiduciary duties towards his employer.

In 2015, the United States Department of Labor issued a proposed rule that if finalized would extend the fiduciary duty relationship to investment advisors and some brokers including insurance brokers. In 2017, the first Trump administration planned to order a 180-delay of implementation of the rule, sometimes known as the 'fiduciary rule'. The rule would require "brokers offering retirement investment advice to put their clients' interest first". The Trump administration later rescinded the fiduciary rule on July 20, 2018. Prior to its repeal, the rule was also dealt blows by the US Fifth Circuit Court of Appeals in March and June 2018.

=== Examples ===
For example, two members, X and Y, of a band are currently under contract with one another (or have some other tangible, existing relationship that creates a legal duty) and record songs together. Let us imagine it is a serious, successful band and that a court would declare the two members to be equal partners in the business. One day, X takes some demos the duo made together to a record label, where an executive expresses interest. X pretends it is all his work and receives an exclusive contract and $50,000. Y is unaware of the encounter until reading it in the paper the next week.

This situation represents a conflict between duty and interest. Both X and Y hold fiduciary duties to each other, which means they must subdue their own interests in favor of the duo's collective interest. By signing an individual contract and taking all the money, X has put personal interest above the fiduciary duty. Therefore, a court will find that X has breached his fiduciary duty. The judicial remedy here will be that X holds both the contract and the money in a constructive trust for the duo. Note: X will not be punished or entirely denied the benefit; both X and Y will receive a half share of the contract and the money.

When T. Boone Pickens's Mesa Petroleum attempted to take over Cities Service in 1982, Cities Service attempted to take over the smaller Mesa instead. Pickens was friends with Alan Habacht of Weiss, Peck & Greer, who supported Mesa's attempt. Fiduciary duty, however, required Habacht to seek the maximum possible return on the investment he managed by offering Weiss's Mesa shares to Cities's tender offer.

== Elements of duty ==
A fiduciary, such as the administrator, executor or guardian of an estate, may be legally required to file with a probate court or judge a surety bond, called a fiduciary bond or probate bond, to guarantee faithful performance of his duties. One of those duties may be to prepare, generally under oath, an inventory of the tangible or intangible property of the estate, describing the items or classes of property and usually placing a valuation on them.

A bank or other fiduciary having legal title to a mortgage may sell fractional shares to investors, thereby creating a participating mortgage.

== Accountability ==
A fiduciary will be liable to account if proven to have acquired a profit, benefit or gain from the relationship by one of three means:

- In circumstances of conflict of duty and interest;
- In circumstances of conflict of duty to one person and duty to another person;
- By taking advantage of the fiduciary position.

Therefore, it is said the fiduciary has a duty not to be in a situation where personal interests and fiduciary duty conflict, a duty not to be in a situation where his fiduciary duty conflicts with another fiduciary duty, and not to profit from his fiduciary position without express knowledge and consent. A fiduciary cannot have a conflict of interest.

The state of Texas in the United States sets out the duties of a fiduciary in its Estates Code, chapter 751, as follows (the bracketed references to TPC refer to the Texas Probate Code superseded by the Estates Code, effective January 1, 2014):

Sec. 751.101. Fiduciary Duties. [TPC §489B(a)]
An attorney in fact or agent is a fiduciary and has a duty to inform and to account for actions taken under the power of attorney.
Sec. 751.102. Duty to Timely Inform Principal. [TPC §489B(b)]
(a) The attorney in fact or agent shall timely inform the principal of each action taken under the power of attorney.
(b) Failure of an attorney in fact or agent to timely inform, as to third parties, does not invalidate any action of the attorney in fact or agent.
Sec. 751.103. Maintenance of Records. [TPC §489B(c), (f)]
(a) The attorney in fact or agent shall maintain records of each action taken or decision made by the attorney in fact or agent.
(b) The attorney in fact or agent shall maintain all records until delivered to the principal, released by the principal, or discharged by a court.
Sec. 751.104. Accounting. [TPC §489B(d), (e)]
(a) The principal may demand an accounting by the attorney in fact or agent.
(b) Unless otherwise directed by the principal, an accounting under Subsection (a) must include:
- (1) the property belonging to the principal that has come to the attorney in fact's or agent's knowledge or into the attorney in fact's or agent's possession;
- (2) each action taken or decision made by the attorney in fact or agent;
- (3) a complete account of receipts, disbursements, and other actions of the attorney in fact or agent that includes the source and nature of each receipt, disbursement, or action, with receipts of principal and income shown separately;
- (4) a listing of all property over which the attorney in fact or agent has exercised control that includes:
  - (A) an adequate description of each asset; and
  - (B) the asset's current value, if the value is known to the attorney in fact or agent;
- (5) the cash balance on hand and the name and location of the depository at which the cash balance is kept;
- (6) each known liability; and
- (7) any other information and facts known to the attorney in fact or agent as necessary for a full and definite understanding of the exact condition of the property belonging to the principal.
(c) Unless directed otherwise by the principal, the attorney in fact or agent shall also provide to the principal all documentation regarding the principal's property.

=== Conflict of duties ===
A fiduciary's duty must not conflict with another fiduciary duty. Conflicts between one fiduciary duty and another fiduciary duty arise most often when a lawyer or an agent, such as a real estate agent, represents more than one client, and the interests of those clients conflict. This would occur when a lawyer attempts to represent both the plaintiff and the defendant in the same matter, for example. The rule follows from the logical conclusion that a fiduciary cannot make the principal's interests a top priority if he has two principals whose interests are diametrically opposed; he must balance the interests, which is not acceptable to equity. Therefore, the conflict of duty and duty rule is really an extension of the conflict of interest and duty rules.

=== No-profit rule ===
A fiduciary must not profit from the fiduciary position. This includes any benefits or profits which, although unrelated to the fiduciary position, came about because of an opportunity that the fiduciary position afforded. It is unnecessary that the principal would have been unable to make the profit; if the fiduciary makes a profit, by virtue of his role as fiduciary for the principal, then the fiduciary must report the profit to the principal. If the principal provides fully informed consent, then the fiduciary may keep the benefit and be absolved of any liability for what would be a breach of fiduciary duty. If this requirement is not met, then the property is deemed by the court to be held by the fiduciary on constructive trust for the principal.

Secret commissions, or bribes, also come under the no profit rule. The bribe shall be held in constructive trust for the principal. The person who made the bribe cannot recover it, since he has committed a crime. Similarly, the fiduciary, who received the bribe, has committed a crime. Fiduciary duties are an aspect of equity and, in accordance with the equitable principles, or maxims, equity serves those with clean hands. Therefore, the bribe is held on constructive trust for the principal, the only innocent party.

Bribes were initially considered not to be held on constructive trust, but rather to be held as a debt owed by the fiduciary to the principal. This approach has been overruled; the bribe is now classified as a constructive trust. The change is due to pragmatic reasons, especially in regard to a bankrupt fiduciary. If a fiduciary takes a bribe and that bribe is considered a debt, then if the fiduciary goes bankrupt, the debt will be left in his pool of assets to be paid to creditors, and the principal may miss out on recovery because other creditors were more secured. If the bribe is treated as held on a constructive trust, it will remain in the fiduciary's possession, despite bankruptcy, until the principal recovers it.

=== Avoiding these accountabilities ===
The landmark Australian decision ASIC v Citigroup noted that "informed consent" on behalf of the beneficiary to breaches of either the no-profit and no-conflict rule will allow the fiduciary to circumvent these rules. Furthermore, it highlighted that a contract may include a clause that allows individuals to avoid all fiduciary obligations within the course of dealings, and thereby continue to make a personal profit or deal with other parties- tasks that may otherwise have been in conflict with what would have been a fiduciary duty had it not been for this clause. In the Australian case of Farah Constructions Pty Ltd v Say-Dee Pty Ltd, however, Gleeson CJ, Gummow, Callinan, Heydon and Crennan JJ observed that the sufficiency of disclosure may depend on the sophistication and intelligence of the persons to whom the disclosure must be made.

However, in the English case of Armitage v Nurse an exception was noted to be the fiduciary's obligation of good faith; liability for breach of fiduciary duty by way of fraud or dishonesty cannot be avoided through an exclusion clause in a contract. The decision in Armitage v Nurse has been applied in Australian .

== Breaches of duty and remedies ==
Conduct by a fiduciary may be deemed constructive fraud when it is based on acts, omissions or concealments considered fraudulent and that gives one an advantage against the other because such conduct—though not actually fraudulent, dishonest or deceitful—demands redress for reasons of public policy. Breach of fiduciary duty may occur in insider trading, when an insider or a related party makes trades in a corporation's securities based on material non-public information obtained during the performance of the insider's duties at the corporation. Breach of fiduciary duty by a lawyer with regard to a client, if negligent, may be a form of legal malpractice; if intentional, it may be remedied in equity.

Where a principal can establish both a fiduciary duty and a breach of that duty, through violation of the above rules, the court will find that the benefit gained by the fiduciary should be returned to the principal because it would be unconscionable to allow the fiduciary to retain the benefit by employing his strict common law legal rights. This will be the case, unless the fiduciary can show there was full disclosure of the conflict of interest or profit and that the principal fully accepted and freely consented to the fiduciary's course of action.

Remedies will differ according to the type of damage or benefit. They are usually distinguished between proprietary remedies, dealing with property, and personal remedies, dealing with pecuniary (monetary) compensation. Where concurrent contractual and fiduciary relationships exist, remedies available to the plaintiff beneficiary is dependent upon the duty of care owed by the defendant and the specific breach of duty allowing for remedy/damages. The courts will clearly distinguish the relationship and determine the nature in which the breach occurred.

=== Constructive trusts ===
Where the unconscionable gain by the fiduciary is in an easily identifiable form, such as the recording contract discussed above, the usual remedy will be the already discussed constructive trust.

Constructive trusts pop up in many aspects of equity, not just in a remedial sense, But, in this sense, what is meant by a constructive trust is that the court has created and imposed a duty on the fiduciary to hold the money in safekeeping until it can be rightfully transferred to the principal.

=== Account of profits ===
An account of profits is another potential remedy. It is usually used where the breach of duty was ongoing or when the gain is hard to identify. The idea of an account of profits is that the fiduciary profited unconscionably by virtue of the fiduciary position, so any profit made should be transferred to the principal. It may sound like a constructive trust at first, but it is not.

An account of profits is the appropriate remedy when, for example, a senior employee has taken advantage of his fiduciary position by conducting his own company on the side and has run up quite a lot of profits over a period of time, profits which he wouldn't have been able to make otherwise. The fiduciary in breach may however receive an allowance for effort and ingenuity expended in making the profit.

=== Compensatory damages ===
Compensatory damages are also available. Accounts of profits can be hard remedies to establish, therefore, a plaintiff will often seek compensation (damages) instead. Courts of equity initially had no power to award compensatory damages, which traditionally were a remedy at common law, but legislation and case law have changed the situation so compensatory damages may now be awarded for a purely equitable action.

== Fiduciary duty and pension governance ==
Some experts have argued that, in the context of pension governance, trustees have started to reassert their fiduciary prerogatives more strongly after 2008 – notably following the heavy losses or reduced returns incurred by many retirement schemes in the wake of the Great Recession and the progression of ESG and Responsible Investment ideas: "Clearly, there is a mounting demand for CEOs (equity issuers) and governments (sovereign bond issuers) to be more 'accountable' ... No longer 'absentee landlords', trustees have started to exercise more forcefully their governance prerogatives across the boardrooms of Britain, Benelux and America: coming together through the establishment of engaged pressure groups." However, in the United States, there are questions whether a pension's decision to consider factors such as how investments impact contributors' continued employment violate a fiduciary duty to maximize the retirement fund's returns.

Pension funds and other large institutional investors are increasingly making their voices heard to call out irresponsible practices in the businesses in which they invest

The Fiduciary Duty in the 21st Century Programme, led by the United Nations Environment Programme Finance Initiative, the Principles for Responsible Investment, and the Generation Foundation, aims to end the debate on whether fiduciary duty is a legitimate barrier to the integration of environmental, social and governance (ESG) issues in investment practice and decision-making. This followed the 2015 publication of "Fiduciary Duty in the 21st Century" which concluded that "failing to consider all long-term investment value drivers, including ESG issues, is a failure of fiduciary duty". Founded on the realization that there is a general lack of legal clarity globally about the relationship between sustainability and investors' fiduciary duty, the programme engaged with and interviewed over 400 policymakers and investors to raise awareness of the importance of ESG issues to the fiduciary duties of investors. The programme also published roadmaps which set out recommendations to fully embed the consideration of ESG factors in the fiduciary duties of investors across more than eight capital markets. Drawing upon findings from Fiduciary Duty in the 21st Century, the European Commission High-Level Expert Group (HLEG) recommended in its 2018 final report that the EU Commission clarify investor duties to better embrace long-term horizon and sustainability preferences.

== See also ==
- Trustee
- Directors' duties
- Compensatory damages
- Constructive trust
- Corporate opportunity
- Court of equity
- Equitable remedy
- Escrow
- Revlon, Inc. v. MacAndrews & Forbes Holdings, Inc.
- Self-dealing
- Trust (law)
- Uniform Prudent Investor Act
- Attorney General v Blake, concerning the extension of fiduciary like remedies to a breach of contract context
