= Bhullar v Bhullar =

UK company law case

- Court: Court of Appeal
- Full case name: Mohan Singh Bhullar & ors v Inderjit Singh Bhullar & anr
- Citations: [2003] EWCA Civ 424, 2 BCLC 241

Case opinions
- Jonathan Parker LJ

Keywords
- Corporate opportunity, unfair prejudice

Bhullar v Bhullar [2003] EWCA Civ 424, 2 BCLC 241 is a leading UK company law case on the principle that directors must avoid any possibility of a conflict of interest, particular relating to corporate opportunities. It was not decided under, but is relevant to, section 175 of the Companies Act 2006.

== Facts ==
Bhullar Bros Ltd was owned by families of two brothers. Each side owned 50% of ordinary shares. The directors were Mr Mohan Bhullar, his son Tim, Mr Sohan Bhullar and his sons Inderjit and Jatinderjit. The company had a grocery store at 44 Springwood Street, Huddersfield. It also owned an investment property called Springbank Works, Leeds Road, which was leased to a bowling alley business called UK Superbowl Ltd. In 1998 the families began to fall out. Mohan and Tim told the board they wished for the company to buy no further investment properties. Negotiations began to split up the company, but they were unsuccessful. In 1999, Inderjit went bowling at the UK Superbowl Ltd alley. He noticed that the carpark next door (called White Hall Mill) was on sale. He set up a company called Silvercrest Ltd (owned by him and Jatinderjit) and bought, but did not tell Bhullar Bros Ltd. But Mohan and Tim found out and brought an unfair prejudice claim (now s 994 Companies Act 2006) on the basis that Inderjit and Jatinderjit had breached their fiduciary duty of loyalty to the company.

== Judgment ==
Jonathan Parker LJ held that there was a clear breach of the rule that directors must avoid a conflict of interest.

41. Like the defendant in Industrial Development Consultants Ltd v Cooley, the appellants in the instant case had, at the material time, one capacity and one capacity only in which they were carrying on business, namely as directors of the Company. In that capacity, they were in a fiduciary relationship with the Company. At the material time, the Company was still trading, albeit that negotiations (ultimately unsuccessful) for a division of its assets and business were on foot. As Inderjit accepted in cross-examination, it would have been "worthwhile" for the company to have acquired the Property. Although the reasons why it would have been "worthwhile" were not explored in evidence, it seems obvious that the opportunity to acquire the Property would have been commercially attractive to the Company, given its proximity to Springbank Works. Whether the Company could or would have taken that opportunity, had it been made aware of it, is not to the point: the existence of the opportunity was information which it was relevant for the Company to know, and it follows that the appellants were under a duty to communicate it to the Company. The anxiety which the appellants plainly felt as to the propriety of purchasing the Property through Silvercrest without first disclosing their intentions to their co-directors – anxiety which led Inderjit to seek legal advice from the Company's solicitor – is, in my view, eloquent of the existence of a possible conflict of duty and interest. 42. I therefore agree with the judge when he said (in paragraph 272 of his judgment) that "reasonable men looking at the facts would think there was a real sensible possibility of conflict".

Brooke LJ and Schiemann LJ concurred.

== See also ==
- Keech v Sandford [1726] EWHC Ch J76
- Whelpdale v Cookson (1747) 1 Ves Sen 9; 27 ER 856
- Aberdeen Railway Co v Blaikie Brothers [1843–60] All ER Rep 252, self dealing case
- Parker v McKenna (1874–75) LR 10 Ch App 96, per James LJ that the rule is necessary for "the safety of mankind"
- Bray v Ford [1896] AC 44 at 51-52, per Lord Herschell, the no possibility of conflict rule is "based upon the consideration that, human nature being what it is, there is danger of the person holding a fiduciary position being swayed by interest rather than duty…."
- Regal (Hastings) Ltd v Gulliver [1967] 2 AC 134n
- Boardman v Phipps [1967] 2 AC 46
- Industrial Development Consultants v Cooley [1972] 1 WLR 443
- Canadian Aero Service Ltd. v. O'Malley (1973) 40 DLR (3d) 371
