= In Plus Group Ltd v Pyke =

United Kingdom company law case

In Plus Group Ltd & Ors v Pyke
- Court: Court of Appeal
- Full case name: In Plus Group Limited, Interiors Plus Limited, Joinery Plus Ltd, Joinery Plus Products Limited v John Albert Pyke
- Decided: March 21, 2002
- Citation: [2002] EWCA Civ 370

Court membership
- Judges sitting: Brooke LJ, Sedley LJ, Jonathan Parker LJ

In Plus Group Ltd v Pyke [2002] EWCA Civ 370 is a UK company law case concerning the fiduciary duties of directors, and in particular the doctrine concerning corporate opportunities. In the course of his appellate judgment, Lord Justice Sedley, sitting with Lord Justice Brooke and Lord Justice Jonathan Parker, cast doubt on the correctness of the contract law case, Bell v. Lever Bros

== Facts ==
In Plus Group Ltd did not like one of its partners, John Pyke, and wanted him to resign. Pyke refused. The other directors tried to squeeze him out by excluding him from management and severing his salary. Without resigning his directorship, Pyke set up his own company and got a lucrative contract with a major In Plus customer. In Plus then sued him for breach of fiduciary duty, arguing that he had procured a corporate opportunity for himself, when he owed it to In Plus.

== Judgment ==
The Court of Appeal, upholding the finding of the trial judge, held in favour of Pyke.

Sedley LJ referred to a submission by Pyke's counsel that Bell v. Lever Bros precluded any liability for holding a directorship which competed with the company. Although unnecessary for the judgment, he questioned whether it could still be regarded as correct. In any case, Sedley LJ acknowledged that Pyke had poached a customer, but said that his...

“...duty to the claimants had been reduced to vanishing point by the acts' of his fellow director and shareholder… For all the influence he had, he might as well have resigned.”

Brooke LJ quoted Lord Upjohn's dissenting judgment in Boardman v. Phipps that the circumstances of...

“...each case must be carefully examined to see whether a fiduciary relationship exists in relation to the matter of which complaint is made”.

He stressed that Pyke had been effectively expelled from the company some six months prior to any of the events in question. Also, he was not allowed to withdraw the money he invested in the company and was being denied remuneration. Pyke had not used any company property for the opportunity, or any confidential information that came to him qua director.

Jonathan Parker LJ concurred with Brooke LJ.

The Court of Appeal was thus intent on achieving a just result for Pyke and, on the particular facts, his effective exclusion from the company eliminated his fiduciary duties. Of particular note is the fact-intensive approach taken by the court in exonerating the director from liability. This is especially so in the light of the anxiety expressed by Sedley LJ in emphasising that the trial judge's finding that the customer had made it known that it would not deal with the claimant was immaterial.19 It is noteworthy that the court opted for this route as a means of exonerating the defendant rather than exercising its discretion to relieve him from liability under s.727 of the Companies Act 1985 had it first chosen to apply the inexorable rule forbidding conflict transactions.

== See also ==
- Guth v. Loft, the Delaware decision that deviated from the strict approach.
- Keech v. Sandford, the rule of equity that has been the bedrock of fiduciary duties for 280 years.
