= Aberdeen Rly Co v Blaikie Bros =

Aberdeen Railway Co v Blaikie Bros
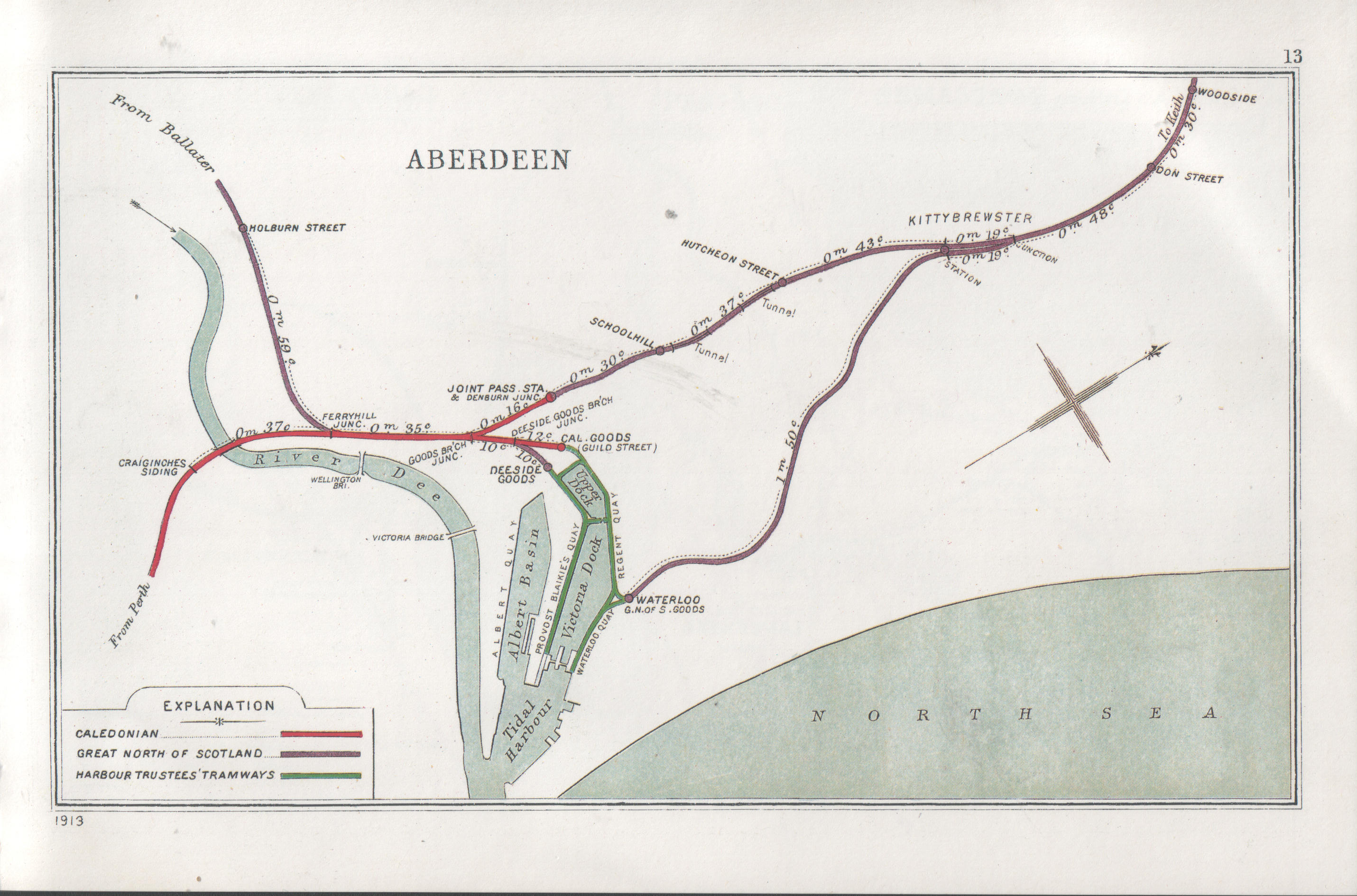
- 1913 map showing (in red) part of the Caledonian Railway, successor to the Aberdeen Railway
- Court: House of Lords
- Citations: [1854] UKHL 1_Macqueen_461 [1854] UKHL 1_Paterson_394 (1853) 15 D (HL) 20 (1854) 1 Macq 461 (1854) 1 Paterson 394
- Transcript

Case opinions
- Lord Cranworth LC

Keywords
- Self dealing, conflict of interest

Aberdeen Railway Co v Blaikie Brothers (1854) 1 Paterson 394 is a UK company law case. It concerns the fiduciary duty of loyalty, and in particular, the duty not to engage in self-dealing. It laid down a basic rule that if a director had an interest in a corporate transaction, the transaction is voidable at the company's will, and it is the duty of directors to avoid any possibility of a conflict of interest.

This case preceded the Companies Act 2006 section 177, that requires that if directors are interested in a proposed transaction, they should merely declare that interest to the board, and section 239 which stipulates that in approving any transaction the interested director may not vote.

== Facts ==
Blaikie Bros had a contract with Aberdeen Railway to make iron chairs at £8.10s a ton. They sued to enforce the contract. Aberdeen Railway argued they were not bound because at the time, the Chairman of their board of directors, Sir Thomas Blaikie, was the managing director of Blaikie Bros. Therefore, there was a conflict of interest.

This case preceded ss 40-1 of the Companies Act 2006, which give directors unlimited capacity to bind the company with those dealing in good faith; but if an action by a director is beyond their authority or in breach of some fiduciary obligation, then they can be made personally liable. Arguably therefore, Blaikie Bros would now have been able to enforce the contract, but Aberdeen could then personally sue the directors for damages flowing from any loss.

== Judgment ==
Lord Cranworth L.C. held that Aberdeen was not bound by the contract. The key points were that it "may sometimes happen that the terms on which a trustee has dealt or attempted to deal with the estate or interest of those for whom he is a trustee, have been as good as could have been obtained from any other person - they may even at the time have been better. But still so inflexible is the rule that no inquiry on that subject is permitted. The English authorities on this head are numerous and uniform." Mr Blaikie's ‘personal interest would lead him to an entirely opposite direction, would induce him to fix the price as high as possible. This is the very evil against which the rule in question is directed, and here I see nothing whatever to prevent its application." Lord Cranworth LC also stated that: "no one, having [fiduciary] duties to discharge, shall be allowed to enter into engagements in which he has, or can have, a personal interest conflicting, or which possibly may conflict, with the interests of those whom he is bound to protect".

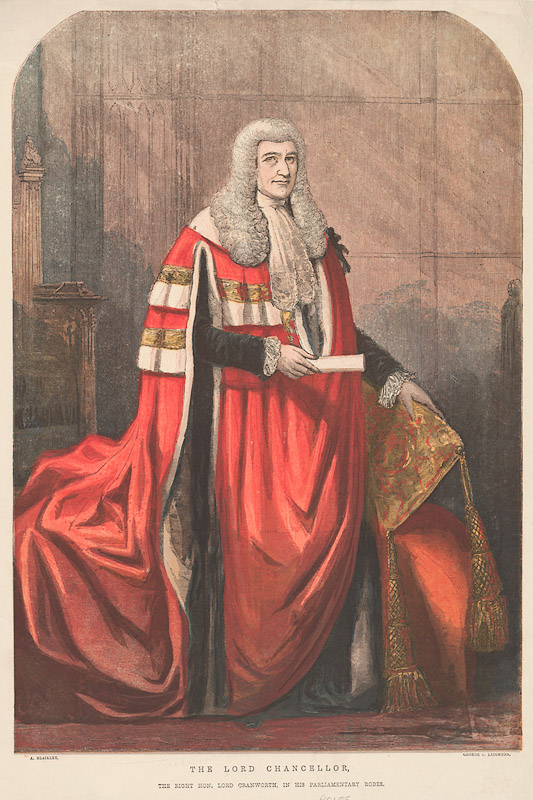
Lord Cranworth L.C. gave the leading judgment with which Lord Brougham concurred.

"This, therefore, brings us to the general question, whether a Director of a Railway Company is or is not precluded from dealing on behalf of the Company with himself, or with a firm in which he is a partner.

The Directors are a body to whom is delegated the duty of managing the general affairs of the Company.

A corporate body can only act by agents, and it is of course the duty of those agents so to act as best to promote the interests of the corporation whose affairs they are conducting. Such agents have duties to discharge of a fiduciary nature towards their principal. And it is a rule of universal application, that no one, having such duties to discharge, shall be allowed to enter into engagements in which he has, or can have, a personal interest conflicting, or which possibly may conflict, with the interests of those whom he is bound to protect.

So strictly is this principle adhered to, that no question is allowed to be raised as to the fairness or unfairness of a contract so entered into.

It obviously is, or may be, impossible to demonstrate how far in any particular case the terms of such a contract have been the best for the interest of the cestui que trust, which it was possible to obtain.

It may sometimes happen that the terms on which a trustee has dealt or attempted to deal with the estate or interest of those for whom he is a trustee, have been as good as could have been obtained from any other person - they may even at the time have been better.

But still so inflexible is the rule that no inquiry on that subject is permitted. The English authorities on this head are numerous and uniform.

The principle was acted on by Lord King in Keech v Sandford, and by Lord Hardwicke in Whelpdale v Cookson, and the whole subject was considered by Lord Eldon on a great variety of occasions...

Mr Blaikie was not only a Director, but (if that was necessary) the Chairman of the Directors. In that character it was his bounden duty to make the best bargains he could for the benefit of the company.

While he filled that character, namely, on 6 February 1846, he entered into a contract on behalf of the Company with his own firm, for the purchase of a large quantity of iron chairs at a certain stipulated price. His duty to the Company imposed on him the obligation of obtaining these chairs at the lowest possible price.

His personal interest would lead him in an entirely opposite direction, would induce him to fix the price as high as possible. This is the very evil against which the rule in question is directed, and I here see nothing whatever to prevent its application.

I observe that Lord Fullerton seemed to doubt whether the rule would apply where the party whose act or contract is called in question is only one of a body of Directors, not a sole trustee or manager.

But, with all deference, this appears to me to make no difference. It was Mr Blaikie’s duty to give his co-Directors, and through them to the Company, the full benefit of all the knowledge and skill which he could bring to bear on the subject. He was bound to assist them in getting the articles contracted for at the cheapest possible rate. As far as related to the advice he should give them, he put his interest in conflict with his duty, and whether he was the sole Director or only one of many, can make no difference in principle.

The same observation applies to the fact that he was not the sole person contracting with the Company; he was one of the firm of Blaikie Brothers, with whom the contract was made, and so interested in driving as hard a bargain with the Company as he could induce them to make.

== See also ==
- Boulting v ACTAT [1963] 2 QB 606, relevant to s 172 Companies Act 2006
- Companies Act 1985, Table A, Art 85, a default rule which changes the default rule of the case to say if a director discloses the nature and extent of the interest to the board, an interested transaction will not be voidable.
- s 317 Companies Act 1985, that a director must declare his interests to the board. Failure to comply leads to a fine.
- Cook v Deeks [1916] 1 AC 554
- Regal (Hastings) Ltd v Gulliver [1942] 1 All ER 378
- Industrial Development Consultants Ltd v Cooley [1972] 1 WLR 443
- Island Export Finance Ltd v Umunna [1986] BCLC 460
- Framlington Group plc v Anderson [1995] BCC 611
- Gencor ACP Ltd v Dalby [2000] 2 BCLC 734
- CMS Dolphin Ltd v Simonet [2001] 2 BCLC 704
