= O'Donnell v Shanahan =

2009 UK company law case

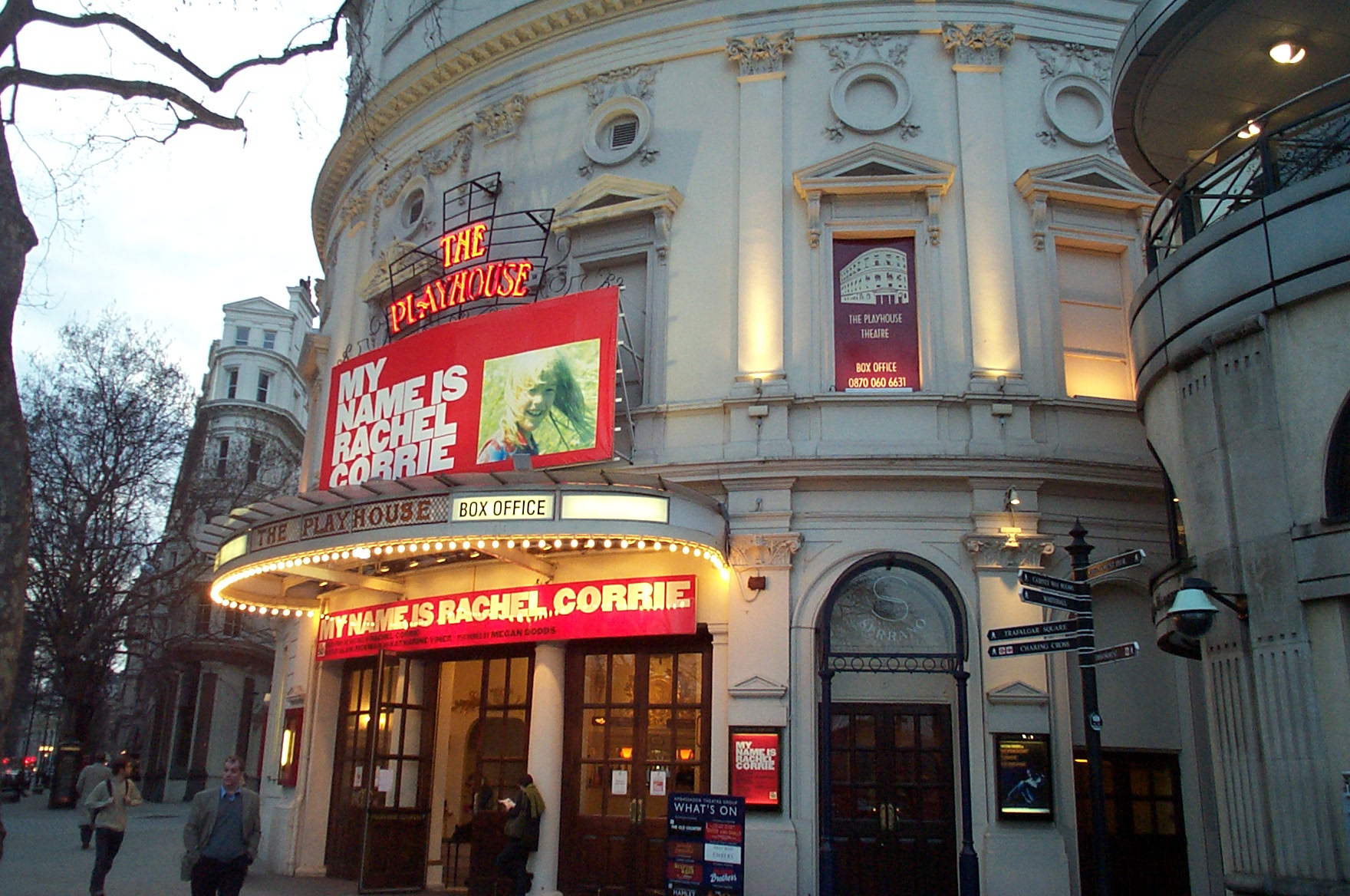
- Court: Court of Appeal
- Decided: July 22, 2009
- Citation: [2009] EWCA Civ 751

Case history
- Prior actions: [2008] EWHC 1973 (Ch), [2009] BCC 517

Court membership
- Judges sitting: Waller LJ, Rimer LJ and Aikens LJ

Keywords
- Unfair prejudice, conflict of interest, secret profits

O'Donnell v Shanahan [2009] EWCA Civ 751 is a UK company law case concerning the strict prohibition on any possibility of a conflict of interest between a company director's duty to promote her company's success and her own gain.

== Facts ==
Allied Business & Financial Consultants Ltd was a small company, with its office above the Charles Dickens pub at 160 Union Street in Southwark. The directors were former Bank of Ireland employees, who had set up the company in 1988, and included Ms O'Donnell and Mr Shanahan who were both directors. Ms O'Donnell had fallen out with the other members allegedly after (among other things) Mr Shanahan had diverted a property investment opportunity - to buy an interest in the fifth floor of Aria House, above the Playhouse Theatre, 23 Craven Street, near Embankment - to one of his own companies. Ms O'Donnell contended that this diversion was a breach of Mr Shanahan's duty as a director to act without any possibility of a conflict of interest, and because Allied Business Ltd could possibly have taken the opportunity, she was in her interests as a member unfairly prejudiced (under Companies Act 1985, section 459, now Companies Act 2006, s 994). She requested that her shares be bought out at a fair value.

== Judgment ==
=== High Court ===
Richard Sheldon QC held, based on the old case of Aas v Benham [1891] 2 Ch 244 that the particular opportunity taken up by Mr Shanahan's company fell outside the scope of Allied's business. Therefore, there was no conflict of interest, and no breach of the no profit rule.

=== Court of Appeal ===
Waller LJ, Rimer LJ and Aikens LJ reversed the High Court and allowed the unfair prejudice petition to proceed. In this particular case it was clear that Mr Shanahan had acted without the company's fully informed consent. The opportunity had come to Mr Shanahan in his capacity as a director of Allied Business Ltd, and so must in principle be accountable for any profit. Aas was distinguishable as a case of partnership, where the business relationship had been circumscribed by contract.

== See also ==
- Keech v Sandford
- Parker v McKenna
- Bhullar v Bhullar
