= Directors' duties in the United Kingdom =

Directors' duties in the United Kingdom bind anybody who is formally appointed to the board of directors of a UK company.

== Scope ==
Directors appointed to the board form the central authority in UK companies. In carrying out their functions, directors (whether formally appointed, de facto, or "shadow directors") owe a series of duties to the company. There are presently seven key duties codified under the Companies Act 2006 sections 171 to 177, which reflect the common law and equitable principles:

171. Duty to act within powers
172. Duty to promote the success of the company
173. Duty to exercise independent judgment
174. Duty to exercise reasonable care, skill and diligence
175. Duty to avoid conflicts of interest
176. Duty not to accept benefits from third parties
177. Duty to declare interest in proposed transaction or arrangement

These may not be limited, waived or contracted out of, but companies may buy insurance to cover directors for costs in the event of breach. The remedies for breaches of duty were not codified, but follow common law and equity, and include compensation for losses, restitution of illegitimate gains and specific performance or injunctions.

== Duty to act for proper purposes ==
The first director's duty under section 171 is to follow the company's constitution, but also only exercise powers for the "proper purpose" relating to the power. Prior proper purpose cases often involved directors plundering the company's assets for personal enrichment, or attempting to install mechanisms to frustrate attempted takeovers by outside bidders, such as a poison pill. Such practices are improper, because they go beyond the reason for which directors were delegated their power.

== Duty of care ==
The all-important duty of care is found in section 174. Directors must display the care, skill and competence that is reasonable for somebody carrying out the functions of the office, and if a director has any special qualifications an even higher standard will be expected. However, under section 1157 courts may, if directors are negligent but found to be honest and ought to be excused, relieve directors from paying compensation. The "objective plus subjective" standard was first introduced in the wrongful trading provision from the Insolvency Act 1986, and applied in Re D'Jan of London Ltd. The liquidator sought to recover compensation from Mr D'Jan, who failing to read an insurance policy form, did not disclose he was previously the director of an insolvent company. The policy was void when the company's warehouse burnt down. Hoffmann LJ held Mr D'Jan's failure was negligent, but exercised discretion to relieve liability on the ground that he owned almost all of his small business and had only put his own money at risk. The courts emphasise that they will not judge business decisions unfavourably with the benefit of hindsight, however simple procedural failures of judgment will be vulnerable. Cases under the Company Director Disqualification Act 1986, such as Re Barings plc (No 5) show that directors will also be liable for failing to adequately supervise employees or have effective risk management systems, as where the London directors ignored a warning report about the derivatives business in Singapore, where a rogue trader caused losses so massive that they brought the whole bank into insolvency.

== Duty to avoid conflicts of interest ==
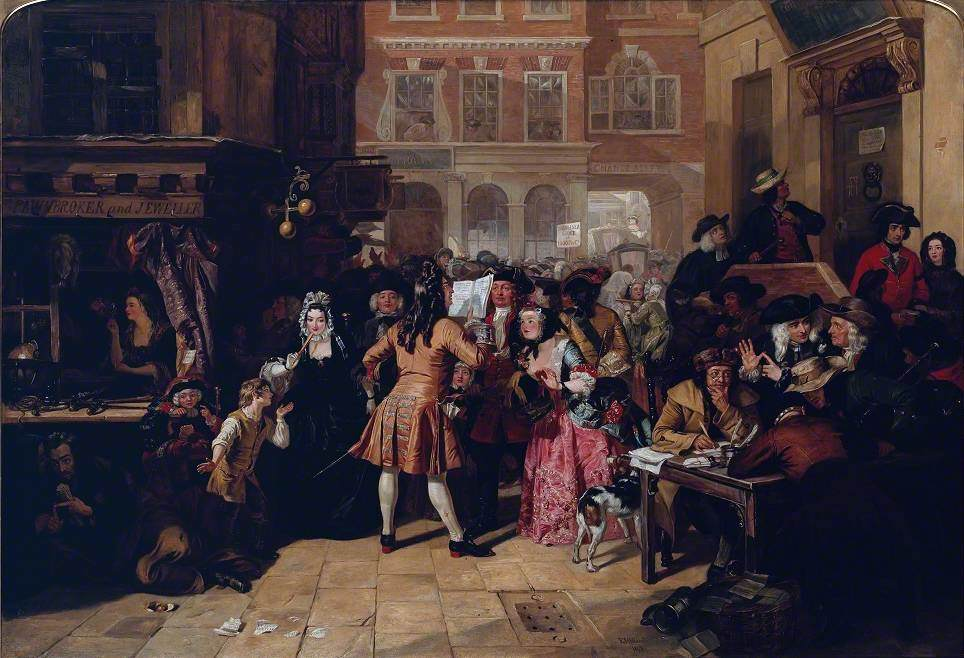
The South Sea Bubble by Edward Matthew Ward. The duty to avoid any possibility of a conflict of interest for fiduciaries has been engrained in law since the financial crisis following the South Sea Bubble of 1719.

The central equitable principle applicable to directors is to avoid any possibility of a conflict of interest, without disclosure to the board or seeking approval from shareholders. This core duty of loyalty is manifested firstly in section 175 which specifies that directors may not use business opportunities that the company could use, unless they have approval. Shareholders may pass a resolution ratifying a breach of duty, but under section 239 they must not have an interest in the transaction. This absolute, strict duty has been consistently reaffirmed since the economic crisis following the South Sea Bubble in 1719. For example, in Cook v Deeks, three directors took a railway line construction contract in their own names, rather than that of their company, to exclude a fourth director from the business. Even though the directors used their votes as shareholders to "ratify" their actions, the Privy Council advised that the conflict of interest precluded their ability to forgive themselves.

I do not think it is necessary, but it appears to me very important, that we should concur in laying down again and again the general principle that in this Court no agent in the course of his agency, in the matter of his agency, can be allowed to make any profit without the knowledge and consent of his principal; that that rule is an inflexible rule, and must be applied inexorably by this Court, which is not entitled, in my judgment, to receive evidence, or suggestion, or argument as to whether the principal did or did not suffer any injury in fact by reason of the dealing of the agent; for the safety of mankind requires that no agent shall be able to put his principal to the danger of such an inquiry as that.

— James LJ, Parker v McKenna (1874-75) LR 10 Ch App 96, 124-125

Similarly, in Bhullar v Bhullar, a director on one side of a feuding family set up a company to buy a carpark next to one of the company's properties. The family company, amidst the feud, had in fact resolved to buy no further investment properties, but even so, because the director failed to fully disclose the opportunity that could reasonably be considered as falling within the company's line of business, the Court of Appeal held he was liable to make restitution for all profits made on the purchase. The duty of directors to avoid any possibility of a conflict of interest also exists after a director ceases employment with a company, so it is not permissible to resign and then take up a corporate opportunity, present or maturing, even though no longer officially a "director".

In Towers v Premier Waste Management Ltd [2011] EWCA Civ 923, Mummery LJ, Wilson LJ and Etherton LJ held that a director who accepted a free loan of equipment from a customer without disclosure or approval breached his fiduciary duty. Regal Hastings and Foster considered.

== Duty to take no third party benefits ==
The purpose of the no conflict rule is to ensure directors carry out their tasks as if their own interest were at stake. Beyond corporate opportunities, the law requires directors accept no benefits from third parties under section 176, and also has specific regulation of transactions by a company with another party in which directors have an interest.

== Duty to disclose self-dealing ==
Under section 177, when directors are on both sides of a proposed contract, for example where a person owns a business selling iron chairs to the company in which he is a director, it is a default requirement that they disclose the interest to the board, so that disinterested directors may approve the deal. The company's articles could heighten the requirement, say, to shareholder approval. If such a self dealing transaction has already taken place, directors still have a duty to disclose their interest and failure to do so is a criminal offence, subject to a £5000 fine.

While such regulation through disclosure hovers with a relatively light touch, self dealing rules become more onerous as transactions become more significant. Shareholder approval is requisite for specific transactions with directors, or connected persons, when the sum of money either exceeds 10% of the company and is over £5,000, or is over £100,000 in a company of any size. Further detailed provisions govern loaning money. On the question of director remuneration where the conflict of interest appears most serious, however, regulation is again relatively light. Directors pay themselves by default, but in large listed companies have pay set by a remuneration committee of directors. Under section 439, shareholders may cast a vote on remuneration but this "say on pay", as yet, is not binding.

== Duty to promote company success ==
In 2002 and in advance of changes to company legislation, the government issued a white paper on Modernising Company Law which suggested that

the basic goal for directors should be the success of the company in the collective best interests of the shareholders, but that [the] directors should also recognize, as the circumstances require, the company's need to foster relationships with its employees, customers and suppliers, its need to maintain its business reputation, and its need to consider the company's impact on the community and the working environment".

Under section 172 of the act, directors must "promote the success of the company for the benefit of its members as a whole" (or, if the company has restricted objects, for the promotion of those objects). This somewhat nebulous provision created significant debate during its passage through Parliament, since it goes on to prescribe that decisions should be taken in the interests of members, with regard to long term consequences, the need to act fairly between members, and a range of other "stakeholders", such as employees, suppliers, the environment, the general community, and creditors. Many groups objected to this "enlightened shareholder value" model, which in form elevated the interests of members, who are invariably shareholders, above other stakeholders. During the 2000s, the United Kingdom has reoriented its system of corporate law around that objective.

However, the duty is particularly difficult to sue upon since it is only a duty for a director to do what she or "he considers, in good faith, would be most likely to promote the success of the company". Proof of subjective bad faith toward any group being difficult, directors have the discretion to balance all competing interests, even if to the short term detriment of shareholders in a particular instance. There is also a duty under section 173 to exercise independent judgment and the duty of care in section 174 applies to the decision making process of a director having regard to the factors listed in section 172, so it remains theoretically possible to challenge a decision if made without any rational basis. Only registered shareholders, not other stakeholders without being members of the general meeting, have standing to claim any breach of the provision.

Section 172's criteria are useful as an aspirational standard because in the annual Director's Report companies must explain how they have complied with their duties to stakeholders. Also, the idea of whether a company's success will be promoted is central when a court determines whether a derivative claim should proceed in the course of corporate litigation.

== See also ==
- UK company law
- US corporate law
