= Holder v Holder =

- Court: Court of Appeal
- Citation: [1968] Ch 353

Keywords
- Conflict of interest, fiduciary duty

Holder v Holder [1968] Ch 353 is an English trusts law case concerning conflict of interest.

== Facts ==
Victor Holder was an executor of his father’s will. He wanted to renounce executorship, after he had performed some tasks in that capacity. Unfortunately that technically meant the executorship could not be properly renounced. The remaining executors put two farms up for auction, on which Victor was a tenant. Victor bought them at the auction. The other beneficiaries of the trust claimed he could not make the purchase, because it would constitute a conflict of interest.

== Judgment ==
Harman LJ and Danckwerts LJ delivered judgments distinguishing this from Lord Eldon’s strong words in Ex parte James and Ex parte Lacey because everybody concerned knew that the purchase was planned, and maybe Lord Eldon exaggerated in saying that what somebody knows is indeterminable.

Another reason lying behind the rule is that there must never be a conflict of duty and interest, but in fact there was none here in the case of Victor, who made no secret throughout that he intended to buy. There is of course ample authority that a trustee cannot purchase. The leading cases are decisions of Lord Eldon - Ex parte Lacey and Ex parte James. In the former case the Lord Chancellor expressed himself thus at 111:

"The rule I take to be this; not, that a trustee cannot buy from *392 his cestui que trust, but, that he shall not buy from himself. If a trustee will so deal with his cestui que trust, that the amount of the transaction shakes off the obligation, that attaches upon him as trustee, then he may buy. If that case112 is rightly understood, it cannot lead to much mistake. The true interpretation of what is there reported does not break in upon the law as to trustees. The rule is this. A trustee, who is entrusted to sell and manage for others, undertakes in the same moment, in which he becomes a trustee, not to manage for the benefit and advantage of himself."

In Ex parte James the same Lord Chancellor said:

"This doctrine as to purchases by trustees, assignees, and persons having a confidential character, stands much more upon general principle than upon the circumstances of any individual case. It rests upon this; that the purchase is not permitted in any case, however honest the circumstances; the general interests of justice requiring it to be destroyed in every instance."

These are no doubt strong words, but it is to be observed that Lord Eldon was dealing with cases where the purchaser was at the time of sale acting for the vendors. In this case Victor was not so acting: his interference with the administration of the estate was of a minimal character and the last cheque he signed was in August before he executed the deed of renunciation. He took no part in the instructions for probate, nor in the valuations or fixing of the reserves. Everyone concerned knew of the renunciation and of the reason for it, namely, that he wished to be a purchaser. Equally, everyone, including the three firms of solicitors engaged, assumed that the renunciation was effective and entitled Victor to bid. I feel great doubt whether the admission made at the bar was correct, as did the judge, but assuming it was right, the acts were only technically acts of intermeddling and I find no case where the circumstances are parallel. Of course, I feel the force of the judge's reasoning that if Victor remained an executor he is within the rule, but in a case where the reasons behind the rule do not exist I do not feel bound to apply it. My reasons are that the beneficiaries never looked to Victor to protect their interests. They all knew he was in the market as purchaser; that the price paid was a good one and probably higher than anyone not a sitting tenant would give. Further, the first two defendants alone acted as executors and sellers: they alone could convey: they were not influenced by Victor in connection with the sales.

Sachs LJ concurred that there was no conflict of interest. He took the view that a hard and fast rule prohibiting all transactions was unnecessary and could be unjust. The courts should examine the facts and then determine whether setting the sale aside is appropriate.

== See also ==
- Keech v Sandford
- Ex parte James (1803) 32 ER 385
- Boardman v Phipps

== Notes ==
- M Conaglen (2006) argued that if a beneficiary has given fully informed consent and the price is fair then a sale to a trustee will be unimpeachable
