= Green v Lord Somerleyton =

English land law and tort law case

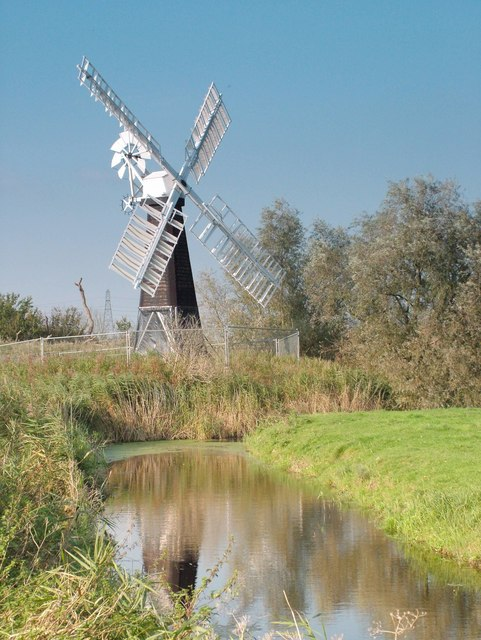
- The claimant blamed inter alia the lack of renewal of the water pump replacing St Olaves windmill but its failure was expressly subject to a heavy rainfall exclusion. The claimant's farmhouse restaurant and defendant's lake are attractions in The Broads National Park.
- Court: Court of Appeal
- Full case name: John Green v Lord Somerleyton and others [trustees of a family settlement owning land neighbouring Green's land]
- Decided: 28 February 2003
- Citation: [2003] EWCA Civ 198

Case history
- Prior actions: Appellant failed at first instance before HHJ Rich QC sitting as High Court judge

Court membership
- Judges sitting: Schiemann LJ; Jonathan Parker LJ; Sir Christopher Staughton

Case opinions
- Decision by: Jonathan Parker LJ
- Concurrence: Schiemann LJ; Sir Christopher Staughton

Keywords
- Easements; natural flooding; lakes; abatement of nuisance; law of mitigation of damage; declaratory relief sought; enlarged lake outside of Rylands v Fletcher type nuisance

Green v Lord Somerleyton [2003] EWCA Civ 198 is an English land law and tort law case, concerning easements of surface water/ditch drainage and the tests for nuisance in English law. In this case there was no remedy for the flooding found to be natural and not recently exacerbated by the defendant. The court attached to the properties an old, 1921, easement of drainage passing both land holdings, in this case two common examples of lowland water engineering, dykes controlled against tides by one-way valves, mentioned in the properties' deeds and, duplicatively, established the right by prescription. The dykes lay in the claimant's own land who had failed to maintain them and failed to account for the flows caused by reduction of water extraction from the lake upstream. The claimant had failed to repair the pump and clear ditches on his own land which had been agreed between the previous owners to give channelled drainage from a lake above. It was for the claimant to recognise the danger posed by its waterline being raised in 1954 by the building up of a weir.

== Facts ==
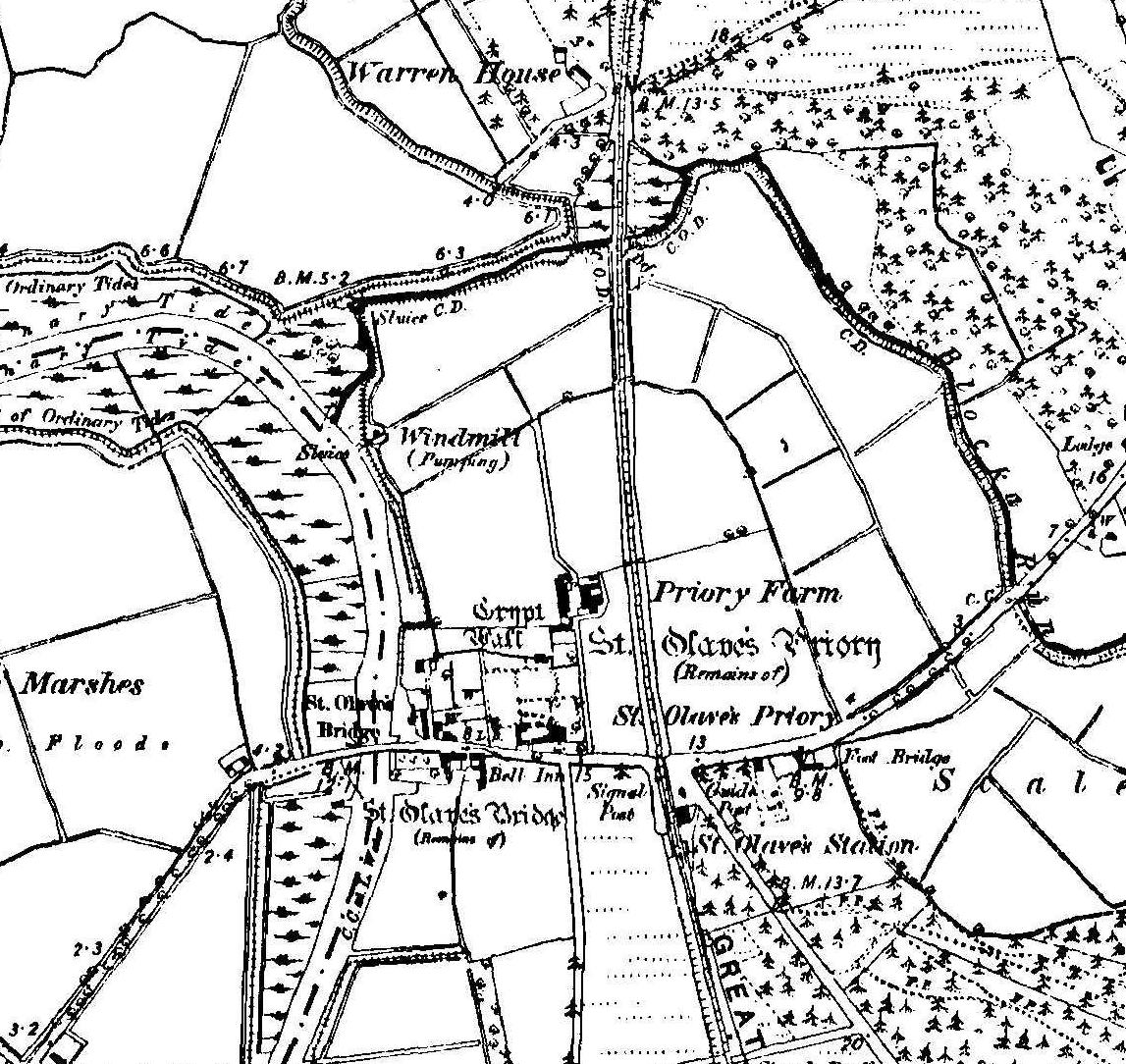
Somerleyton's large holdings on the right (and further to the east) as in the 19th century drained via the old pumping windmill site and sluice into the tidal Waveney, passing Green's land at centre and at north

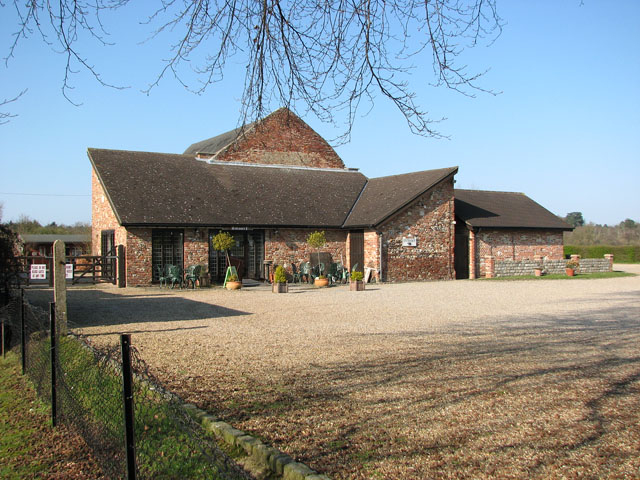
A restaurant is today at Priory farm house, St Olaves, Fritton near Great Yarmouth, Mr Green's Farm

Green had substantial lower land straddling two, parallel, long-established dykes in St Olaves in the Norfolk Broads. Green admitted he was responsible for keeping the dykes in working order. Water from Lord Someleyton's higher land drained into the dykes, and Green brought an action in nuisance to stop flooding happening after a deep winter flood. He attributed the topping of the dykes to the damming with a weir in 1954 of a Middle Ages-enlarged lake (Fritton Decoy) and other features of Somerleyton's upper land. Water topped the dykes into Priory Marsh which Green used as summer pasture for his cattle at Priory Farm. Under a 1958 drainage deed, if Green chose to accept his predecessor's burdens under it as to the dyke, then Somerleyton was responsible to renew but not to repair or maintain a 4.5 to 5 ton electric water pump at the bottom of Green's land, but nothing further; its exclusion proviso was extensive such as a breach in the sea wall (below) or exceptional rainfall. The old main drainage channel was long silted up at the tidal sluice which occurred .... within the length which the claimant's predecessors had undertaken to maintain.

Green's re-amended particulars of claim before the hearings plead that Fritton Lake is not "present naturally" on the Upper Land...a "reservoir" which Lord Somerleyton has at all material times "maintained"; that it is of such a size that it is reasonably foreseeable that water escaping from it is likely to damage Priory Marshes; and that Lord Somerleyton is accordingly liable for the damage to Priory Marshes caused by the flooding, under the rule in Rylands v Fletcher (1868). The judge rejected that claim, and the Court of Appeal refused grounds to appeal against that part of the decision.

The trustees of Lord Somerleyton's land counterclaimed that they had an easement for the water drainage from a 1921 conveyance by implied reservation, showing it attempted to incorporate a deed of covenant and to bind the property.

Green countered (by amended reply and defence to counterclaim) that any such easement would be of a limited nature, and not such as to vest in the upper land owners a general right to discharge water (including, in particular, water emanating from the lake) into the dykes on Priory Marshes.

The judge held there was no remedy in nuisance for naturally flowing water, applying Leakey v National Trust [1980].

== Judgment ==
Jonathan Parker LJ's judgment approved by the rest of the panel, held that nuisance could cover floodwater relating to a shared conduit. But Green had not made clear what action they ought to take, nor had he taken action to reduce risk himself. As the downstream owner he had abrogated his responsibilities.

Somerleyton's counterclaim was upheld. The provisions in the drainage deed were incorporated by reference into the conveyance to Green – the test in the final court of appeal's decision in Pwllbach Colliery Co Ltd v Woodman was expressly applied (similar to section 54 of the Law of Property Act 1925), and by implication those drainage rights were intended to be proprietary. So Somerleyton did have an easement of drainage.

115. By those words, the 1921 Conveyance effectively incorporates by reference the entirety of the provisions of the 1921 Drainage Deed. To my mind, the clear inference to be drawn from this is that the provisions of the 1921 Drainage Deed were intended to have the character of proprietary, as opposed to merely contractual, rights. The 1921 Drainage Deed itself imposed obligations on Lord Somerleyton and his successors (a further indication that the parties were concerned with something more than merely contractual rights) to maintain and work the pump:

"... whenever requisite for the purpose of draining the said lands [i.e. Scale Marshes and Priory Marshes] and effectually drain the same."

116. It also imposed obligations on the purchaser, Mr Mallett, to keep the dykes on Priory Marshes "cleansed and open and in proper order".

117. Given the terms of the 1921 Drainage Deed, and their express incorporation by reference into the 1921 Conveyance, the conclusion seems to me to be inescapable that the 1921 Conveyance impliedly reserved to Lord Somerleyton and his successors in title to Scale Marshes an easement of drainage through the existing dykes in the terms claimed by the Trustees.

The Court of Appeal held also the defendant's land enjoyed a duplicative easement by prescription, applying the test for that set in Honey v Silversprings [1992] EWHC that the use(r) relied on had the requisite certainty and uniformity to establish a prescriptive right.

== Cases distinguished ==
- Palmer v Bowman [2000] EWCA (runoff is an essential incident of ownership of land, incapable of grant by easement), distinguished on the basis its rule applies to land outside of shared drains/ditches/dykes
- Rees v Skerrett [2001] 1 WLR 1541 (EWCA Civ)
- Abbahall Ltd v Smee [2002] EWCA Civ 1831
- Holbeck Hall Hotel Ltd v Scarborough Borough Council [2000] QB 836
- Marcic v Thames Water Utilities Ltd [2002] QB 929 EWCA Civ
- Nitro-Phosphate and Odam's Chemical Manure Co v London and St Katharine Docks Co 9 Ch D 512 (concerning a sea wall, partly taken down, distinguished by Thomas below)

== Cases considered and approved ==
- Leakey v National Trust [1980] QB 485 (EWCA Civ)
- Honey v Siversprings Bleaching and Dyeing Co Ltd [1992] Ch 268
- Home Brewery Co Ltd v William Davis & Co [1987] QB 339
- Bybrook Barn Centre Ltd v Kent County Council [2000] CA (unreported)
- Delaware Mansions Ltd v. Westminster County Council [2002] 1 AC 321 HL
- L. E. Jones Ltd v. Portsmouth City Council [2003] 1 WLR 427

== Cases followed ==
- Thomas & Evans Ltd v. Mid-Rhondda Co-operative Society [1941] 1 KB 381 (EWCA Civ)
- Elston v Dore (1982) ALR 577 (Australia) (applies and approves Thomas)
- Loring v Brightwood Golf & Country Club Ltd (1974) 44 DLR (3d) 161 (Canada) (applies and approves Thomas)

== See also ==
- English land law
- English trusts law
- English property law
