= Colin Rimer =

English judge

Sir Colin Percy Farquharson Rimer (born 30 January 1944) is a former judge of the English Court of Appeal; he retired in 2014.

== Education ==
He was educated at Dulwich College from 1954 to 1962 and at Trinity Hall, Cambridge.

== Legal career ==
Rimer was called to the bar (Lincoln’s Inn) in 1968 and made a Bencher in 1994. He was appointed a Queen's Counsel in 1988. He was appointed a Justice of the High Court on 3 October 1994 and was assigned to the Chancery Division. On 1 October 2007, he became a Lord Justice of Appeal, on the retirement of Robin Auld. He retired on 7 October 2014.

== Cases ==
- Hunter v Moss [1994] 1 WLR 452 (overturned on reasoning)
- Gencor ACP Ltd v Dalby [2000] 2 BCLC 734
- Sinclair Investment Holdings SA v Versailles Trade Finance (No. 3) [2007] EWHC 915
- Consistent Group Ltd v Kalwak [2008] EWCA Civ 430 (reversed by Autoclenz Ltd v Belcher [2011] UKSC 41)
- Moore Stephens v Stone Rolls Ltd [2008] EWCA Civ 644
- Chartbrook Ltd v Persimmon Homes Ltd [2008] EWCA Civ 183 (overturned)
- Re Sigma Finance Corporation [2008] EWCA Civ 1303
- Revenue and Customs Commissioners v Annabel’s (Berkeley Square) Ltd [2009] EWCA Civ 361
- O'Donnell v Shanahan [2009] EWCA Civ 751
- Williams v British Airways plc [2009] EWCA Civ 281 (overturned)
- Parkwood Leisure Ltd v Alemo-Herron [2010] EWCA Civ 24
- Jones v Kernott [2010] EWCA Civ 578 (overturned)
- Revenue and Customs Commissioners v Banerjee [2011] 1 WLR 702
- Petrodel Resources Ltd v Prest [2012] EWCA Civ 1395 (overturned)
- Hounga v Allen [2014] UKSC 47 (overturned)
- Home Office v Essop [2017] UKSC 27 (overturned)

== Arms ==
Coat of arms of Colin Rimer

Motto
Ratione Et Humanitate
