= Kaur v MG Rover Group Ltd =

- Court: Court of Appeal of England and Wales
- Decided: 17 November 2004
- Citation: [2004] EWCA 1507

Court membership
- Judges sitting: Brooke LJ, Parker LJ and Keene LJ

Keywords
- Employment contract

Kaur v MG Rover Group Ltd [2004] EWCA Civ 1507 is a UK labour law case concerning the contract of employment. It held that promises to make no compulsory redundancies in a collective agreement were "aspirational" and not apt for being incorporated into individual contracts of employment. This meant that, aside from the collective agreement being unenforceable under the Trade Union and Labour Relations (Consolidation) Act 1992, section 179, the promises to employees could be broken.

== Facts ==
The car manufacturer, MG Rover was in trouble. Mrs Kaur's contract said,

Employment with the company is in accordance with and, where appropriate, subject to… collective agreements…

Her work place collective agreement was called 'The Way Ahead Partnership Agreement' signed in 1997, which in 'Job Security 2.1.' said the following.

As with the successful introduction of "Rover Tomorrow-The New Deal', THERE WILL BE NO COMPULSORY REDUNDANCY.

Mrs Kaur was threatened with redundancy in 2003. She claimed an injunction against being dismissed.

== Judgment ==
Keene LJ said that even when there were express words, the question was whether the context and character of the agreement made them apt for incorporation into individual contracts. Therefore, the agreement was not intended to create individual rights.

31. I can accept that The Way Ahead does generally have the character of a bargain, struck between the appellant and the unions, and that what is said in it about compulsory redundancy reflected the statements about more flexible working by the workforce. But that does not get the respondent very far at all. It is what one would expect of a collective agreement, which as both sides accept is an agreement but not something which is in itself normally enforceable at law. At a collective level, various assurances and statements as to the future were undoubtedly made by both the employer and the trade unions. But the fact that paragraph 2.1 was not unilateral but part of such a package tells one nothing about its aptness for incorporation as a term of individual contracts of employment.

32. That issue is one to be resolved by looking at the words relied on in their context. That context contains a number of features, which seem to me to indicate that those words are expressing an aspiration rather than a binding contractual term. First, the preceding sentence in the same paragraph is important. It describes enabling employees who want to work for Rover to stay with Rover as "an objective," something therefore which it is hoped to achieve. But that objective is the very same thing as saying that there will be no compulsory redundancy. It is only if the objective is achieved that there would be no compulsory redundancy. It follows that the character of the crucial second sentence is to be viewed in the light of the first sentence, indicating that this is an objective, rather than a binding promise.

33. Secondly, that is reinforced by the opening words of the second sentence, "as with the successful introduction of 'Rover Tomorrow – The New Deal'," which suggest that the statement about no compulsory redundancy is to be seen as a repeat of the earlier position in The New Deal. Yet, as I have already concluded, the position under The New Deal was one where the statements about employees being able to stay with Rover were not contractual commitments. Thirdly, paragraph 2.3 of The Way Ahead is relevant, as it is the positive counterpart of the statement about no compulsory redundancy. Paragraph 2.3 spells out how future reductions in manpower will be achieved and so, implicitly, how compulsory redundancies can be avoided. It is the other side of the coin to paragraph 2.1. But it states that such reductions "will be achieved in future, with the co-operation of all employees, through natural wastage … (etc)." As Mr Goudie submits, this indicates that avoiding compulsory redundancies is contingent on the co-operation of the workforce as a whole, whatever that may mean. That makes it very difficult to see the reference to "no compulsory redundancy" as an enforceable term in each employee's contract of employment, both because of the vagueness of the language of paragraph 2.3 and because any entitlement would depend on the activities of others in the workforce. I regard paragraph 2.3 as highly relevant when one comes to consider the significance of paragraph 2.1. Seen together, the aspirational nature of the company's statement is plain, as indeed is its collective rather than individual character.

34. I conclude, therefore, that the words relied on by the respondent in paragraph 2.1 of The Way Ahead were not intended to be incorporated into the contracts of employment of individual employees and were not apt for such incorporation. In so far as they formed part of a bargain with the unions, the commitment was solely on a collective basis. For these reasons and, in respect of the cross-appeal, for the reasons given earlier in this judgment, I would allow the appeal and dismiss the cross-appeal.

Jonathan Parker LJ and Brooke LJ agreed.

== See also ==
- Employment contract in English law
- Autoclenz Ltd v Belcher [2011] UKSC 41
- Nanjing Automobile (Group) Corporation
