= Guth v. Loft Inc. =

Guth v. Loft Inc
- Court: Delaware Court of Chancery
- Decided: April 11, 1939
- Citation: 5 A.2d 503, 23 Del. Ch. 255 (Del. 1939)

Court membership
- Judges sitting: Daniel J. Layton, Richards, Rodney, Speakman, Terry

Case opinions
- Layton

Keywords
- Directors' duties, conflicts of interest

Guth v. Loft Inc, 5 A.2d 503, 23 Del. Ch. 255 (Del. 1939) is a Delaware corporation law case, important for United States corporate law, on corporate opportunities and the duty of loyalty. It deviated from the year 1726 rule laid down in Keech v Sandford that a fiduciary should leave open no possibility of conflict of interest between his private dealings and the job he is entrusted to do.

== Facts ==
Charles Guth was the president of Loft, Inc., a candy and syrup manufacturer, which served a cola drink at its fountain stores. Loft Inc's soda fountains purchased cola syrup from The Coca-Cola Company, but Guth decided it would be cheaper to buy from The Pepsi-Cola Company after Coke declined to give him a larger jobber discount. Pepsi went bankrupt before Guth (and Loft Inc) could inquire about obtaining syrup from Pepsi.

Guth then personally bought the Pepsi company and its syrup recipe. With the aid of Loft Inc chemists, he reformulated the recipe, and soon purported to sell the syrup to Loft Inc.

He was sued by Loft Inc's shareholders, who alleged that he breached his fiduciary duty of loyalty to the company by failing to offer that opportunity to Loft Inc, instead appropriating it for himself.

== Judgment ==
The Delaware Supreme Court, Chief Justice Daniel J. Layton, held that Guth had breached his fiduciary duties to Loft Inc, by taking an opportunity that the company was interested in, and could itself have exploited.

Corporate officers and directors are not permitted to use their position of trust and confidence to further their private interests. While technically not trustees, they stand in a fiduciary relation to the corporation and its stockholders. A public policy, existing through the years, and derived from a profound knowledge of human characteristics and motives, has established a rule that demands of a corporate officer or director, peremptorily and inexorably, the most scrupulous observance of his duty, not only affirmatively to protect the interest of the corporation committed to his charge, but also to refrain from doing anything that would work injury to the corporation, or to deprive it of profit or advantage which his skill and ability might properly bring to it, or to enable it to make in the reasonable and lawful exercise of its powers.

...

On the other hand, it is equally true that, if there is presented to a corporate officer or director a business opportunity which the corporation is financially able to undertake, which is, from its nature, in the line of the corporation's business and is of practical advantage to it, is one in which the corporation has an interest or a reasonable expectancy, and, by embracing the opportunity, the self-interest of the officer or director will be brought into conflict with that of his corporation, the law will not permit him to seize the opportunity for himself.

...

The occasions for the determination of honesty, good faith and loyal conduct are many and varied, and no hard and fast rule can be formulated. The standard of loyalty is measured by no fixed scale.

It followed that where a corporation cannot take an opportunity because (1) it has no money (2) it has a different business, and/or (3) it has not "interest or reasonable expectancy" in taking the opportunity, then a director will be found to have legitimately taken an opportunity for itself. Layton felt that there was no real standard for loyalty and it depends on the facts of the case. The court may enquire and will decide upon the fairness of any transaction.

== Significance ==
This has been followed in the Delaware General Corporation Law §144, although authorities differ as to whether §144 covers the Guth v. Loft situation.
