= Boardman v Phipps =

Landmark English trusts law case

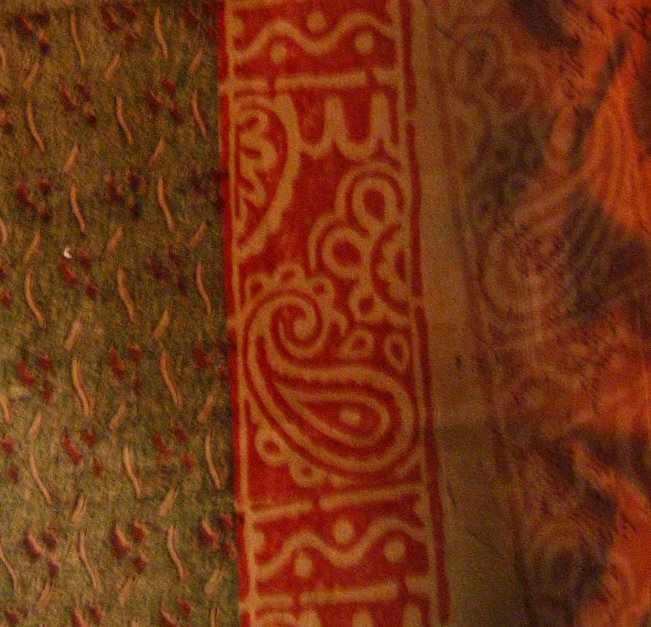
- Court: House of Lords
- Decided: 3 November 1966
- Citations: [1966] UKHL 2, [1967] 2 AC 46, [1966] 3 WLR 1009, [1966] 3 All ER 721
- Transcript: Full text of judgment

Case history
- Prior actions: [1965] Ch 992, [1965] 2 WLR 839 and [1964] 1 WLR 993

Court membership
- Judges sitting: Viscount Dilhorne, Lord Cohen, Lord Hodson, Lord Guest and Lord Upjohn

Keywords
- conflict of interest, trusts, fiduciary duties

Boardman v Phipps [1966] UKHL 2 is a landmark English trusts law case concerning the duty of loyalty and the duty to avoid conflicts of interest.

== Facts ==
Mr Tom Boardman was the solicitor of a family trust. The trust assets include a 27% holding in a company (a textile company with factories in Coventry, Nuneaton and in Australia through a subsidiary). Boardman was concerned about the accounts of the company, and thought that to protect the trust a majority shareholding is required. He and a beneficiary, Tom Phipps, went to a shareholders' general meeting of the company. They realised together that they could turn the company around. They suggested to a trustee (Mr Fox) that it would be desirable to acquire a majority shareholding, but Fox said it was completely out of the question for the trustees to do so. With the knowledge of the trustees, Boardman and Phipps decided to purchase the shares themselves. They bought a majority stake. But they did not obtain the fully informed consent of all the beneficiaries. By capitalizing some of the assets, the company made a distribution of capital without reducing the values of the shares. The trust benefited by this distribution £47,000, while Boardman and Phipps made £75,000. But then John Phipps, another beneficiary, sued for their profits, alleging a conflict of interest.

== Judgment ==
=== High Court ===
Wilberforce J held that Boardman was liable to pay for his breach of the duty of loyalty by not accounting to the company for that amount of money, but that he could be paid for his services.

=== Court of Appeal ===
Lord Denning MR, Russell LJ and Pearson LJ upheld Wilberforce J's decision and held that Boardman and Phipps had breached his duty of loyalty, which arose as they had become self-appointed agents representing the trust, by putting themselves in a conflict of interest. They were therefore liable for the profits earned. However, they would be able to retain a generous remuneration for the services they had performed. On this, Lord Denning MR said (at 1021)

Ought Boardman and Tom Phipps to be allowed remuneration for their work and skill in these negotiations? The plaintiff is ready to concede it, but in case the other beneficiaries are interested in the account, I think we should determine it on principle. This species of action is an action for restitution such as Lord Wright described in the Fibrosa case. The gist of it is that the defendant has unjustly enriched himself, and it is against conscience that he should be allowed to keep the money. The claim for repayment cannot, however, be allowed to extend further than the justice of the case demands. If the defendant has done valuable work in making the profit, then the court in its discretion may allow him a recompense. It depends on the circumstances. If the agent has been guilty of any dishonesty or bad faith, or surreptitious dealing, he might not be allowed any remuneration or reward. But when, as in this case, the agents acted openly and above board, but mistakenly, then it would be only just that they should be allowed remuneration. As the judge said:

"it would be inequitable now for the beneficiaries to step in and take the profit without paying for the skill and labour which has produced it."

I think there should be a generous remuneration allowed to the agents.

=== House of Lords ===
The majority of the House of Lords (Lords Cohen, Guest and Hodson) held that there was a possibility of a conflict of interest, because the solicitor and beneficiary might have come to Boardman for advice as to the purchases of the shares. They owed fiduciary duties (to avoid any possibility of a conflict of interest) because they were negotiating over use of the trust's shares. The majority disagreed about the nature and relevance of information used by Boardman and Phipps. Lord Cohen said the information is not truly property and it does not necessarily follow that, because an agent acquired information and opportunity while acting in a fiduciary capacity, he is accountable. His liability to account depends on the facts. His Lordship regarded Boardman to be liable because he acquired the information in the course of the fiduciary relationship and because of the fiduciary relationship. The other two members of the majority, Lord Hodson and Lord Guest, opined that information can constitute property in appropriate circumstances and in the current case, the confidential information acquired can be properly regarded as property of the trust. Therefore, Boardman was speculating with trust property and should be liable. The majority agreed unanimously that liability to account for the profits made by virtue of a fiduciary relationship is strict and does not depend on fraud or absence of bona fides, and so Phipps and Boardman would have to account for their profits. However, they were generously remunerated for their services to the trust.

Lord Upjohn dissented, and held that Phipps and Boardman should not be liable because a reasonable man would not have thought there was any real sensible possibility of a conflict of interest. This is because there is no possibility the trustee would seek Boardman's advice to purchase the shares and at any rate Boardman could have declined to act if given such request.

"It is perhaps stated most highly against trustees or directors in the celebrated speech of Lord Cranworth L.C. in Aberdeen Railway v. Blaikie, 136 where he said:

"And it is a rule of universal application, that no one, having such duties to discharge, shall be allowed to enter into engagements in which he has, or can have, a personal interest conflicting, or which possibly may conflict, with the interests of those whom he is bound to protect."

The phrase "possibly may conflict" requires consideration. In my view it means that the reasonable man looking at the relevant facts and circumstances of the particular case would think that there was a real sensible possibility of conflict; not that you could imagine some situation arising which might, in some conceivable possibility in events not contemplated as real sensible possibilities by any reasonable person, result in a conflict."

His Lordship distinguished Regal (Hastings) v Gulliver by restricting Regal Hastings to circumstances concerned with property of which the principals were contemplating a purchase. In the present case, as the purchase of the shares was entirely out of the question, Regal Hastings was said to be inapplicable.

Lord Upjohn also agreed with Lord Cohen that information is not property at all, although equity will restrain its transmission if it has been acquired by a breach of confidence. He said unequivocally that knowledge learnt by a trustee in the course of his duties is not property of the trust and may be used for his own benefit unless it is confidential information which is given to him (i) in circumstances which, regardless of his position as a trustee, would make it a breach of confidence to communicate it to anyone or (ii) in a fiduciary capacity.

== See also ==
- English trusts law
- Corporate law
- Business judgment rule

UK case law

- Keech v Sandford (1724) 2 Sel Cas Ch 16
- Whelpdale v Cookson (1747) 1 Ves Sen 9
- Regal (Hastings) Ltd v Gulliver [1967] 2 AC 134n
- Industrial Development Consultants v Cooley [1972] 1 WLR 443
- Bhullar v Bhullar [2003] 2 BCLC 241
