= Walter Staunton Mack Jr. =

American businessman

Walter Staunton Mack
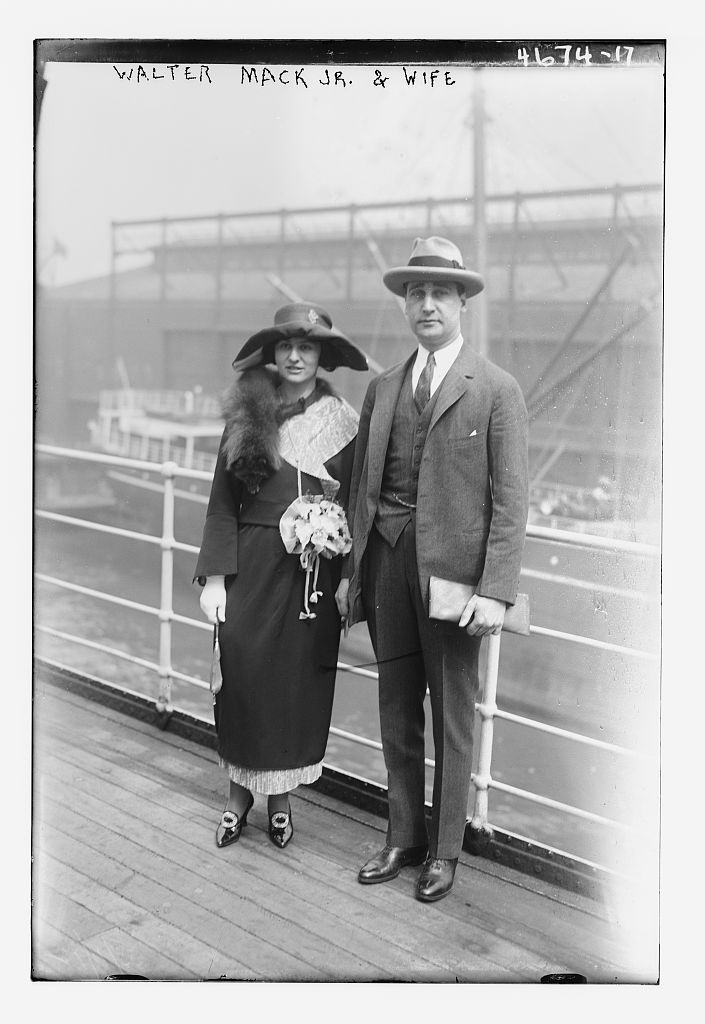

President of Pepsi-Cola
- In office 1938–1951
- Preceded by: Charles Guth

Personal details
- Born: October 19, 1895 Manhattan, New York City
- Died: March 18, 1990 (aged 94) Manhattan, New York City
- Education: DeWitt Clinton High School; Harvard College
- Occupation: Businessman, financier

Walter Staunton Mack (October 19, 1895 – March 18, 1990) was an American drink businessman and financier. He was president of Pepsi-Cola from 1938 until 1951 after taking over from Charles Guth. Walter S Mack Jr, his son, married Consuelo Mack.

== Biography ==
Mack was born on October 19, 1895, in Manhattan, New York City.

He graduated from DeWitt Clinton High School and from Harvard College in 1917. In World War I he joined the United States Navy, and he earned an ensign's commission while he served in the North Atlantic.

He was elected Pepsi's president in 1938, and served as both president and board chairman from 1951 to 1956. When he became president, the cola company had just been spun off from Loft, Inc., a New York candy company that sold its soft drink, in syrup form, to candy store soda fountains. The formula was concocted in 1893 by a North Carolina pharmacist.

Pepsi was only one of scores of cola drinks when he became president, and like all the others, was making little headway against the giant Coca-Cola bottling concern. But Pepsi made $3 million in 1938, increased profits an impressive 76 percent, and saw its stock increase in value from $70 to $190 a share.

Mack decided that real success would only come at the expense of Coke. In the late 1930s, in a notable court case, Pepsi won from Coke the right to add "cola" to its name. By the 1940s, Pepsi too was an international giant and second only to Coca-Cola in sales.

Another noted move he made was to dispense with long, wordy advertisements on radio and broadcast memorable commercial jingles. One famous spot, "Pepsi-Cola Hits the Spot", launched in 1939, went:

Pepsi-Cola hits the spot,
Twelve full ounces, that's a lot,
Twice as much for a nickel, too,
Pepsi-Cola is the drink for you.

Under Mack's direction, Pepsi also became known for its aggressive promotion campaigns. Before he stepped down, the company was financing nearly 120 new scholarships each year. It began a national program of scholarships for black students in 1945. The company also financed art exhibits, and built gathering places for city youths and for servicemen.

He resigned after a fight with the board of directors over his promotion campaigns and the stream of innovations he was bringing to the company. These included selling soft drinks in cans in the early 1950s, the first large firm to do so.

After leaving Pepsi, he directed a variety of companies. In 1978, he came out of retirement to set up King-Cola Corp., which went bankrupt in 1981.

Mack, who was born in New York City, graduated from Harvard University in 1917. He then served as a Navy officer aboard destroyers and transports in the Atlantic during World War I.

His 1982 autobiography, "No Time Lost," published by Atheneum, included other details of his wartime duty. He remembered Newport, R.I., as "a continuous round . . . of cocktail parties, banquets, holiday balls and especially coming-out parties for the debutantes."

After the war, he became a salesman with the Bedford Mills textile firm, and rose to its presidency in 1926. Five years later, he resigned to enter the investment banking business. During the Great Depression, he gained a reputation as a businessman and financer who could turn around troubled companies. He and his companies would pump money into failing firms where they saw promise, after gaining stock options and a say in management. It was while working with the Loft's candy chain that Mack discovered its Pepsi syrup and saw its potential.

Over the years, he also was active in New York civic affairs and in the Republican Party. He ran unsuccessfully for the state Senate from Manhattan in 1932 and worked on New York Mayor Fiorello LaGuardia's mayoral campaigns. He also served as chairman of the New York County Republican Committee and was active in most Republican presidential races from the early 1940s to the early 1960s.

In his later years, Mack was a vocal advocate for older workers. "Work keeps me alive, as it does a great many people," he testified before the House Select Committee on Aging in 1981. He remained active in business ventures until about two years ago.

He died on March 18, 1990, of heart disease at his home in Manhattan, New York City.
