= Industrial Development Consultants Ltd v Cooley =

1972 UK law case

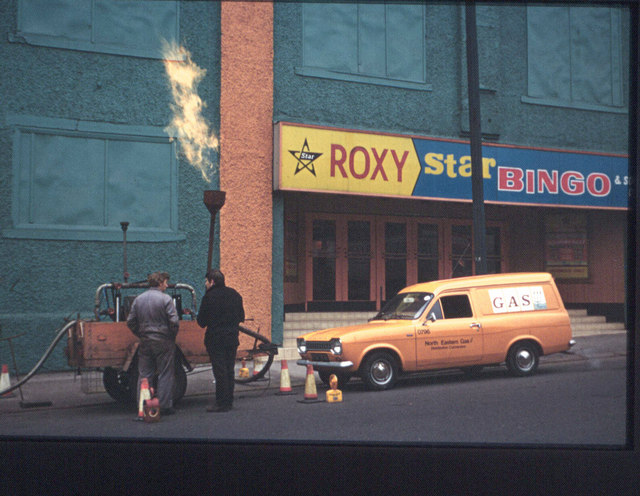
- Court: High Court
- Citation: [1972] 1 WLR 443

Court membership
- Judge sitting: Roskill J

Keywords
- resigning director, conflict of interest, trusts, fiduciary duties

Industrial Development Consultants Ltd v Cooley [1972] 1 WLR 443 is a UK company law case on the corporate opportunities doctrine, and the duty of loyalty from the law of trusts.

It is also applicable for fiduciary duty of an agent under agency law which states that an agent has a fiduciary relationship with his principal. This is a position which is similar to that of a trustee.

== Facts ==
Mr Cooley was an architect employed as managing director of Industrial Development Consultants Ltd., part of IDC Group Ltd. The Eastern Gas Board had a lucrative project pending, to design a depot in Letchworth. Mr. Cooley was told that the gas board did not want to contract with a firm, but directly with him. Mr. Cooley then told the board of IDC Group that he was unwell and requested he be allowed to resign from his job on early notice. They acquiesced and accepted his resignation. He then undertook the Letchworth design work for the gas board on his own account. Industrial Development Consultants found out and sued him for breach of his duty of loyalty.

== Judgment ==
Roskill J. held that even though there was no chance of IDC getting the contract, if they had been told they would not have released him. So he was held accountable for the benefits he received. He rejected the argument that because he made it clear in his discussions with the Gas Board that he was speaking in a private capacity, Mr. Cooley was under no fiduciary duty. He had ‘one capacity and one capacity only in which he was carrying on business at that time. That capacity was as managing director of the plaintiffs.’ All information which came to him should have been passed on.

Roskill J, quoted, Parker v McKenna (1874) 10 Ch.App. 96, James L.J. said, at p. 124:

I do not think it is necessary, but it appears to me very important, that we should concur in laying down again and again the general principle that in this court no agent in the course of his agency, in the matter of his agency, can be allowed to make any profit without the knowledge and consent of his principal; that that rule is an inflexible rule, and must be applied inexorably by this court, which is not entitled, in my judgment, to receive evidence, or suggestion, or argument as to whether the principal did or did not suffer any injury in fact by reason of the dealing of the agent; for the safety of mankind requires that no agent shall be able to put his principal to the danger of such an inquiry as that.

Throughout the last century, and also in the present century, courts of the highest authority have always strictly applied this rule.

== See also ==
- Keech v. Sandford (1724) 2 Sel Cas Ch 61
- Whelpdale v. Cookson (1747) 1 Ves Sen 9
- Regal (Hastings) Ltd v. Gulliver [1967] 2 AC 134n
- Boardman v. Phipps [1967] 2 AC 46
- Meinhard v. Salmon, 164 N.E. 545 (N.Y. 1928)
