= Annabel's (Berkeley Square) Ltd v Revenue and Customs Comrs =

Inland Revenue v Annabel's
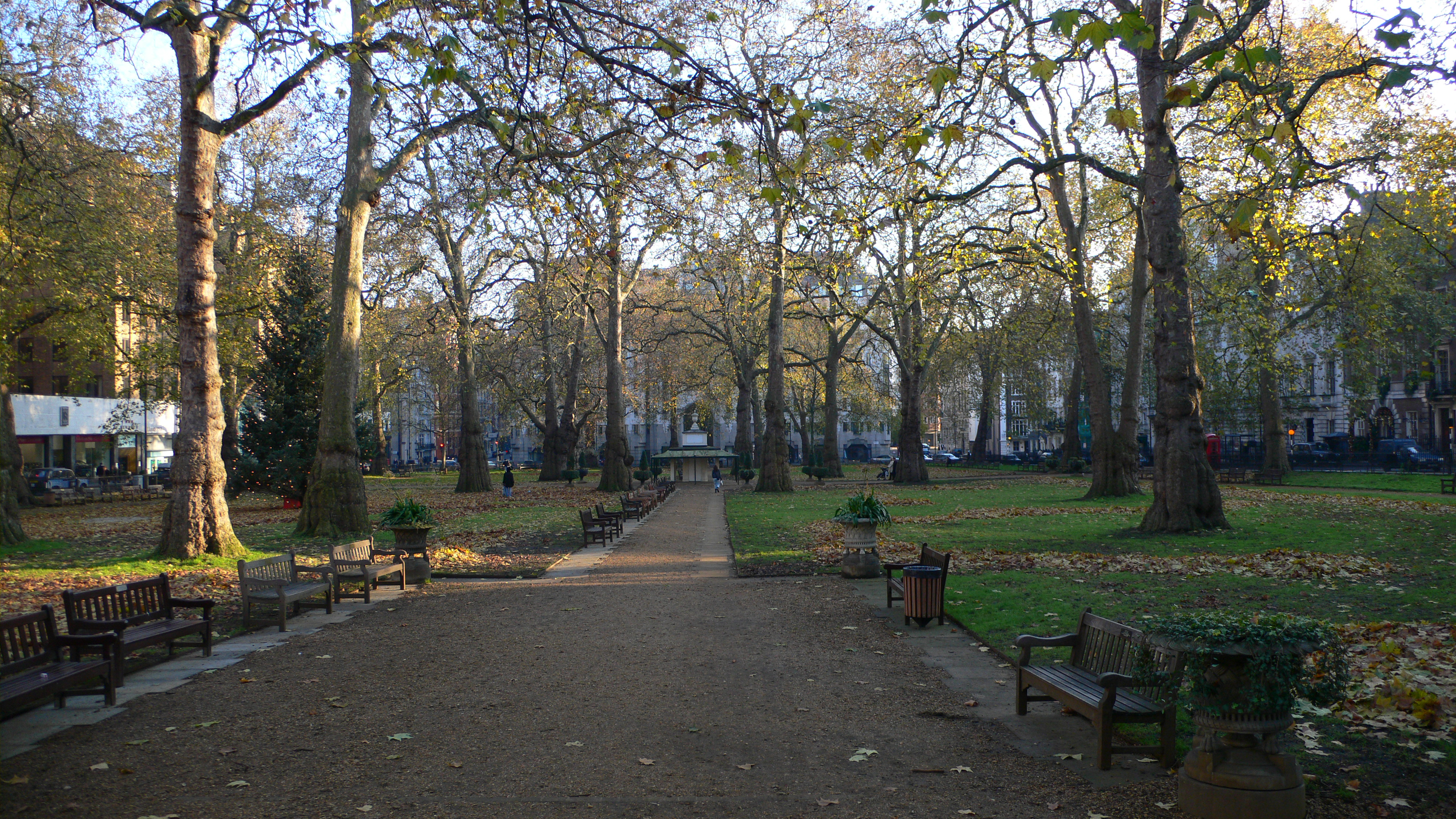
- Court: Court of Appeal of England and Wales
- Decided: 7 May 2009
- Citation: [2009] EWCA Civ 361, [2009] ICR 1123

Court membership
- Judges sitting: Mummery LJ, Rimer LJ and Sullivan LJ

Keywords
- Minimum wage

Revenue and Customs Commissioners v Annabel's (Berkeley Square) Ltd [2009] EWCA Civ 361 is a UK labour law case regarding the treatment of tips under the National Minimum Wage Act 1998. It led to the abolition of tips being considered part of wages for the purpose of assessing compliance with the national minimum wage.

== Facts ==
Workers at a club named Annabel's on Berkeley Square, in London's Mayfair, as well as George (Mount Street) Ltd and Harry's Bar Ltd had a "troncmaster" in charge of tips. Tips would be distributed to all the employees based on length of service under a points system. The troncmasters were the senior managers, and were given the job by the employer.

Her Majesty's Revenue and Customs (HMRC) issued National Minimum Wage Act 1998 (NMWA 1998) s. 19 enforcement notices, saying that the employer was not entitled to deduct the amounts distributed through this system from the workers' wages. It argued that the tronc system did not count under the National Minimum Wage Regulations 1999 (NMWR 1999) r. 30(a) as "money payments paid by the employer to the worker". NMWR 1999 rr. 31–37 set out the reductions allowed and r 31(1)(e) said that money "paid by customers by way of a service charge, tip, gratuity or cover charge that is not paid through the payroll" is not a legitimate reduction.

The amounts claimed to be outstanding were £49,862.45, £48,901.97 and £28,738.47 at the respective restaurants (so around £125,000). The employer's argument was that since the troncmaster was always contractually bound to distribute the money, or was the employer's agent and appeals about the process would always go to the employer, it never became the employees' money. In the alternative, the troncmaster was holding the money on a primary trust to pay the employees, or failing that for the employers, a Quistclose trust. HMR's argument was that when the money was handed over to the troncmaster, in his capacity as such, there was a trust for him to pay the money to the employees. Although the money started as the employer's, when given to the troncmaster, this meant the money was no longer being paid under r. 30(a) "by the employer".

Mr Edge in the Employment Tribunal held that the tronc payments could be a part of the minimum wage and rescinded the enforcement notice, but Wilkie J in the Employment Appeal Tribunal (EAT) held they could not.

== Judgment ==
Rimer LJ upheld the EAT, and preferred HMRC's arguments, holding that the tips were not part of the pay and the restaurants were in breach of the National Minimum Wage Act 1998.

34 It is an irresistible inference that the employers' purpose behind the establishment of the troncmaster arrangements was (at least in part) to take advantage of the exemption from national insurance contributions in respect of gratuities. To achieve that exemption it was essential that the allocation of the gratuities between the employees should be decided upon by someone other than the employer; and, in their skeleton argument to the employment tribunal, the employers emphasised that the troncmasters had been "given full responsibility, free from interference, to determine a fair system of distribution and to apply it".

Mummery LJ and Sullivan LJ concurred.

== Significance ==
Although the 2009 Statutory Instrument changed the law, it has been reported that many employers are breaching the new law and sticking with their old practice of taking their workers' tips.

== See also ==
- National Minimum Wage Act 1998
