= Murad v Al-Saraj =

- Court: Court of Appeal
- Decided: 29 July 2005
- Citations: [2005] EWCA Civ 959, [2005] All ER (D) 503

Court membership
- Judges sitting: Arden LJ; Jonathan Parker LJ; Clarke LJ

Keywords
- Breach of trust

Murad v Al-Saraj [2005] EWCA Civ 959 is an English trusts law case, concerning remedies for breach of trust for a conflict of interest. It exemplifies a restitution claim.

== Facts ==
The Murad sisters and Mr Al-Saraj, who acted through his company called W Co, started a joint venture (which created fiduciary duties among those in the venture) to buy a hotel at £4.1m, through a new company. The Murads would contribute £1m, and £500,000 was meant to come from Mr Al-Saraj. The rest was to come from a bank loan. But Al-Saraj instead set off an unenforceable debt that the seller of the property owed him, and also got a commission for arranging the sale. This was a breach of fiduciary duty, by fraudulently misrepresenting his contribution and failing to disclose his profit. The hotel was then sold at a profit of $2m.

== Judgment ==
=== High Court ===
At first instance Etherton J held that even if the Murads had known, they would have gone ahead with the purchase, although they would have demanded a greater share of the profits. Nevertheless, Mr Al-Saraj and his company had to account for the entire profit made. Mr Al-Saraj argued that his liability should not be his full profits, but only those that he would not have made if the fraud and secret profit were not present.

=== Court of Appeal ===
The Court of Appeal held that a fiduciary had to give up his unauthorised gains. It was irrelevant what he might have done, and not within the ability of Mr Al-Saraj, given his wrongdoing, to argue that some better outcome may have transpired if he had been honest. A fiduciary may retain gains that are properly to be regarded as the product of his own skill and labour, rather than breach of duty. Only actual consent could get rid of the liability to account. Arden LJ said that because of the advances in evidence and civil procedure, there is no reason the courts are incapable of addressing what might have happened.

It may be asked why equity imposes stringent liability of this nature ... equity imposes stringent liability on a fiduciary as a deterrent — pour encourager les autres. Trust law recognises what in company law is now sometimes called the ‘agency’ problem. There is a separation of beneficial ownership and control and the shareholders (who may be numerous and only have small numbers of shares) or beneficial owners cannot easily monitor the actions of those who manage their business or property on a day to day basis. Therefore, in the interests of efficiency and to provide an incentive to fiduciaries to resist the temptation to misconduct themselves, the law imposes exacting standards on fiduciaries and an extensive liability to account.

Jonathan Parker LJ concurred.

Clarke LJ dissented on the extent of Mr Al-Saraj’s liability to account. Where there was an antecedent arrangement for profit sharing, it could be shown that it is inequitable to account for all profits.

On the judge's findings, the sum of GBP 500,000 was treated as a cost of the acquisition in its entirety and was accordingly allowed as a deduction from the profits for which S was to account. But that overlooked the fact that some GBP 369,000 was a commission earned by S on the acquisition of the hotel for which he should account as a secret profit. No objection could be taken to the allowance of the balance of the GBP 500,000 as one of the costs of acquisition. The claim for an account of the GBP 369,000 was unanswerable unless the claim to recover that sum belonged to D and the issue whether that company was the proper claimant in respect of the secret commission should be remitted to the judge on terms that the appellants should join D as a defendant. Therefore the cross appeal was allowed to the extent of the GBP 369,000 for the purpose of remitting to the judge for determination the question whether any claim to recover the commission paid to S in respect of the acquisition of the hotel was vested in D or M.

== See also ==
- English trusts law
