= Bray v Ford =

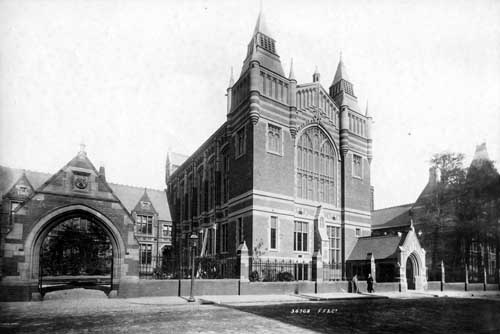
- Great Hall of the University of Leeds. This case involved dispute among the management of its predecessor, Yorkshire College.
- Court: House of Lords
- Citation: [1896] AC 44

Keywords
- Jury misdirection, libel, conflict of interest

Bray v Ford [1896] AC 44 is an English defamation law case, which also concerns some principles of conflict of interest relevant for trusts and company law.

== Facts ==
Mr Bray was a governor of Yorkshire College. Mr Ford was the vice-chairman of the governors and had also been working as a solicitor for the college. Bray sent him a letter, and circulated it to others, saying,

“Sir, during last summer, as you are aware, it came to my knowledge that whilst holding the fiduciary position of vice-chairman of the Yorkshire College you were illegally and improperly, as you know, making profit as its paid solicitor.”

This was held to be libellous by the jury at trial. But Cave J had directed the jury that the college's articles did in fact allow for pay of services as a solicitor. The jury awarded £600 damages, and the question was whether the award could stand in the face of the misdirection.

The Court of Appeal (Lord Esher MR, Lopes LJ and Rigby LJ) held this was a misdirection, but that it was libel anyway, the misdirection was unsubstantial and the jury would have decided the same.

== Judgement ==
The House of Lords, composed of Lord Halsbury LC, Lord Watson, Lord Herschell, Lord Shand unanimously reversed the Court of Appeal's decision, on the basis that the decision of whether a libel existed was peculiarly within the jury's power to decide, and the misdirection did constitute a ‘substantial wrong or miscarriage’ requiring a new trial. Lord Herschell's opinion went as follows..

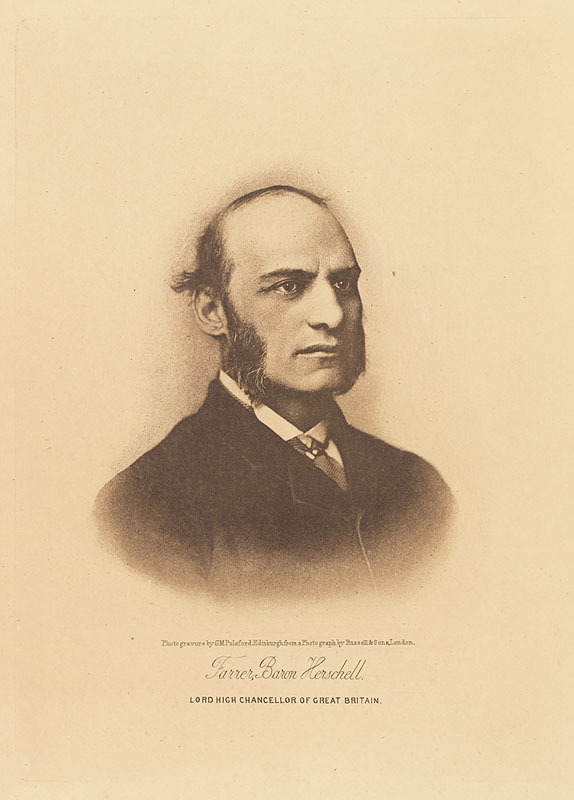
The 1st Lord Herschell.

My Lords, in this case the respondent obtained a verdict for 600l. in an action of libel tried before Cave J. and a special jury at Leeds. The respondent is a solicitor, and has been for some years vice-chairman of the council of the Yorkshire College. He has manifested his interest in the work of the college by large pecuniary contributions. Either alone or in conjunction with his partner he has acted as solicitor to the college since its incorporation nearly twenty years ago. Prior to 1878, in which year he entered into partnership with another solicitor, he made a present of his time and labour to the college. After entering into partnership he considered that he was not at liberty to do so. He informed the college of this, and bills of costs were afterwards delivered to and charged against the college in the usual way. The total amount of the profit received by the respondent on these bills of costs, which covered the period from 1879 to 1893, was 103l. 10s. His annual subscriptions to the college during the same period considerably exceeded that amount.

The libel complained of was a copy of a letter addressed to the respondent, which was sent to more than 300 of the governors of the college and to some other persons. The letter commenced by stating that the respondent, whilst holding the fiduciary position of vice-chairman of the college, had been illegally and improperly, as he knew, making profit as its paid solicitor. On this were founded some comments which a jury would be, to say the least, justified in regarding as gravely libellous.

At the trial it was contended that the respondent was, by virtue of the fourth clause of the college's memorandum of association, entitled to receive remuneration for his services, notwithstanding the position he held as vice-chairman of the council. The learned judge adopted this view, and so directed the jury. The Court of Appeal have held that this was erroneous, and I agree with them. I do not think the words relied on have the effect contended for. It is not now in controversy that if this be so the respondent was not warranted in making a charge for his professional services. It is an inflexible rule of a Court of Equity that a person in a fiduciary position, such as the respondent's, is not, unless otherwise expressly provided, entitled to make a profit; he is not allowed to put himself in a position where his interest and duty conflict. It does not appear to me that this rule is, as has been said, founded upon principles of morality. I regard it rather as based on the consideration that, human nature being what it is, there is danger, in such circumstances, of the person holding a fiduciary position being swayed by interest rather than by duty, and thus prejudicing those whom he was bound to protect. It has, therefore, been deemed expedient to lay down this positive rule. But I am satisfied that it might be departed from in many cases, without any breach of morality, without any wrong being inflicted, and without any consciousness of wrong-doing. Indeed, it is obvious that it might sometimes be to the advantage of the beneficiaries that their trustee should act for them professionally rather than a stranger, even though the trustee were paid for his services. It is clear, however, that the learned judge misdirected the jury, and that, as the misdirection cannot be said to have been on a point wholly immaterial, the appellant would have been entitled, prior to the Judicature Act, to a new trial as of right.

Order XXXIX r 6 provides that a new trial shall not be granted on the ground of misdirection, unless, in the opinion of the Court, some substantial wrong or miscarriage has been thereby occasioned in the trial. The Court of Appeal came to the conclusion that there had been no such wrong or miscarriage in the present case. They thought, as I understand, that the nature of the libel was such that the jury would have been entitled to give, and would probably have given, the same verdict, even if the direction of the learned judge had been the other way. If I had thought that the enactment relied on sanctioned dealing with the case in this way, I am far from saying that I should have differed from the conclusion at which they arrived. But I have come, with some reluctance, I own, to the conclusion that it does not.

The provision is, in my opinion, a very beneficial one, and I should be sorry to say anything to narrow its scope further than the language employed seems to me to render necessary. In cases in which the question is what are the facts, or the proper inferences to be drawn from the facts, if the Court think that the verdict of the jury is in accordance with the true view of the facts and of the inferences to be drawn from them, it may be that they would have done right in refusing to grant a new trial on the ground of misdirection, even where the parties had a right to claim that the action should be tried by a jury. But in the case of an action for libel, not only have the parties a right to trial by jury, but the assessment of damages is peculiarly within the province of that tribunal. The damages cannot be measured by any standard known to the law; they must be determined by a consideration of all the circumstances of the case, viewed in the light of the law applicable to them. The latitude is very wide. It would often be impossible to say that the verdict was a wrong one, whether the damages were assessed at 500l. or 1000l. Where, then, the judge so directs the jury as to lead them to take an erroneous view of any material part of the alleged libel, and this view may have affected their minds in considering what damages they should award, I think there has been a substantial miscarriage within the meaning of the rule. The Court may think, as I might think in the case before your Lordships, that the jury would have given the same damages if the law had been correctly expounded; but this is a mere matter of speculation: it cannot be asserted with the least certainty that they would have done so. The jury have returned their verdict on what they were erroneously led to think was the case, and not on the real case which the defendant was entitled to have submitted to them.

I find it impossible to say that the case upon which the jury ought to have adjudicated ever was wholly before them, and that they were allowed to give to all the circumstances which might legitimately have influenced the verdict their due weight. This seems to me to establish that there has been a substantial miscarriage, and that the appellant is entitled to a new trial.

== See also ==
- Cook v Deeks [1916] 1 AC 554
- Regal (Hastings) Ltd v Gulliver [1942] 1 All ER 378
- Industrial Development Consultants Ltd v Cooley [1972] 1 WLR 443
- Gencor ACP Ltd v Dalby [2000] 2 BCLC 734
- CMS Dolphin Ltd v Simonet [2001] 2 BCLC 704
