= Ex p James =

Ex parte James
- Court: Court of Chancery
- Full case name: Ex parte James or Re James
- Decided: 9 April 1803
- Citation: (1803) 32 ER 385, (1803) 8 Ves 337

Court membership
- Judge sitting: Lord Eldon LC

Keywords
- Conflict of interest

Ex parte James (1803) 32 ER 385 is an insolvency and company law case, concerning conflicts of interest, and the absolute duty to avoid them.

== Facts ==
A bankrupt's estate was purchased by a solicitor to the commission of the bankrupt.

== Judgment ==
Lord Eldon LC stated the following in his judgment:

This doctrine as to purchases by trustees, assignees, and persons having a confidential character, stands much more upon general principle than upon the circumstances of any individual case. It rests upon this, that the purchase is not permitted in any case, however honest the circumstances, the general interests of justice requiring it to be destroyed in every instance; as no court is equal to the examination and ascertainment of the truth in much the greater number of cases.

== See also ==
- Regal (Hastings) Ltd v Gulliver [1942] 1 All ER 378
- Holder v Holder [1968] Ch 353
