= Jonathan Parker (judge) =

British Lord Justice of Appeal

The Right Honourable Sir Jonathan Parker

Lord Justice of Appeal
- In office 2000–2007

Justice of the High Court
- In office 1991–2000

Personal details
- Born: Jonathan Frederic Parker; 8 December 1937 (age 88) Bishop's Stortford, Hertfordshire, England
- Spouse: Maria-Belen Burns (m. 1967)
- Children: 4
- Education: Winchester College
- Alma mater: Magdalene College, Cambridge
- Occupation: Judge
- Profession: Barrister

Sir Jonathan Frederic Parker, PC (born 8 December 1937) is a retired British Lord Justice of Appeal.

== Education ==
Sir Jonathan was born in Bishop's Stortford, Hertfordshire, the son of Sir Edmund Parker CBE (1908–1981) and Elizabeth Mary Butterfield (died 1984). His father was a distinguished accountant who was senior partner of Price Waterhouse & Co. and president of the Institute of Chartered Accountants in England and Wales from 1967–68. He was educated at Winchester College and then Magdalene College, Cambridge.

== Career ==
He was called to the Bar in 1962. He was appointed as Queen's Counsel in 1979. He became a Bencher of the Inner Temple in 1985, and served as head of chambers at 11 Old Square, Lincoln's Inn.

He became a High Court Judge in the Chancery Division in 1991 when he received the customary knighthood. He then became a Lord Justice of Appeal in 2000, whereupon he was appointed to the Privy Council in the usual way. He retired from the bench in 2007.

He also served as the Attorney-General of the Duchy of Lancaster from 1989 to 1991 and as Vice-Chancellor of the County Palatine of Lancaster from 1994 to 1998.

== Judicial decisions ==
As a Lord Justice of Appeal and as a judge at first instance, Sir Jonathan Parker was involved a number of important judicial decisions, including:

- In Plus Group Ltd v Pyke [2002] EWCA Civ 370
- Kaur v MG Rover Group Ltd [2004] EWCA Civ 1507
- Re Barings plc (No 5) [1999] 1 BCLC 433 (High Court)
- Oldham v Kyrris [2003] EWCA Civ 1506
- Green v Lord Somerleyton [2003] EWCA Civ 198
- Murad v Al-Saraj [2005] EWCA Civ 959
- Regentcrest plc v Cohen [2001] 2 BCLC 80
- Rock (Nominees) Ltd v RCO Holdings Ltd [2004] EWCA Civ 118
- Bhullar v Bhullar [2003] EWCA Civ 424
- Royal Trust Bank v National Westminster Bank plc (High Court)
- Lipkin Gorman v Karpnale Ltd [1989] 1 WLR 1340 (Court of Appeal)
- Re Spectrum Plus Ltd [2004] EWCA Civ 670 (Court of Appeal)

== Personal life ==
Sir Jonathan is married to Maria-Belen Burns, daughter of publisher Thomas Ferrier Burns OBE. He and Lady Parker have three sons: James (born 1968), Oliver (born 1969), and Peter (born 1971), and a daughter, Clare (born 1972).

Legal offices
Preceded by Sir Donald Rattee	Attorney-General of the Duchy of Lancaster; 1989 - 1991	Succeeded by Dame Mary Arden
Preceded by Sir Andrew Morritt	Vice-Chancellor of the County Palatine of Lancaster; 1994 - 1998	Succeeded by Sir William Blackburne
