= David Keene (judge) =

English judge (born 1941)

The Right Honourable Sir David Keene PC

High Court Judge
- In office 1994–2000

Lord Justice of Appeal
- In office 2000–2009

Personal details
- Born: David Wolfe Keene; 15 April 1941 Sunbury-on-Thames, Surrey, England
- Occupation: Judge
- Profession: Barrister

Sir David Wolfe Keene PC (born 15 April 1941) is a retired Lord Justice of Appeal.

== Career ==
David Keene was called to the English Bar in 1964 by the Inner Temple. He was appointed Queen's Counsel in 1980, and appointed a Recorder in 1989. He practised mainly in public law cases and at planning inquiries. In his career as a barrister he obtained planning permission for a number of large developments, including London City Airport, and the second runway at Manchester Airport.

He was chairman of the Planning Bar in 1994, in which year he was also appointed as a High Court judge and assigned to the Queen's Bench Division. In 2000, he was appointed to the Court of Appeal where he served until he retired in 2009.

Sir David Keene was also a bencher and ultimately the Treasurer of the Inner Temple. He also served as Chairman of the Judicial Studies Board, and is an Honorary Fellow of Balliol College, Oxford.

From 2003 to 2007 he was Chairman of the Judicial Studies Board, responsible for the training of all Judges and Magistrates in England and Wales, having previously been chairman of its Equal Treatment Committee for five years. He was a member of the QC Selection Panel from 2010 to 2012. He is an Honorary Fellow of Balliol College, Oxford and the Society of Advanced Legal Studies, and is a member of the Chartered Institute of Arbitrators. He was Deputy President of the QFC Civil and Commercial Court in Qatar between 2010 and 2013 and since 2013 has been the Chairman of the Qatar Financial Centre Regulatory Tribunal.

From 2011 to 2014 non-executive chairman of Third-party litigation funder Argentum Capital.

Sir David Keene was regarded as being a close friend of former British Prime Minister, Tony Blair and his wife Cherie Blair QC.
