= Self-dealing =

Professional fraud

Self-dealing is the conduct of a trustee, attorney, corporate officer, or other fiduciary that consists of taking advantage of their position in a transaction and acting in their own interests rather than in the interests of the beneficiaries of the trust, corporate shareholders, or their clients. According to the political scientist Andrew Stark, "[i]n self-dealing, an officeholder's official role allows her to affect one or more of her own personal interests." It is a form of conflict of interest.

Self-dealing may involve misappropriation or usurpation of corporate assets or opportunities. Political scientists Ken Kernaghan and John Langford define self-dealing as "a situation where one takes an action in an official capacity which involves dealing with oneself in a private capacity and which confers a benefit on oneself."

Examples include "work[ing] for government and us[ing] your official position to secure a contract for a private consulting company you own" or "using your government position to get a summer job for your daughter."

Where a fiduciary has engaged in self-dealing, this constitutes a breach of the fiduciary relationship. The principal of that fiduciary (the person to whom duties are owed) may sue and both recover the principal's lost profits and disgorge the fiduciary's wrongful profits.

In the United States, repeated self-dealing by a private foundation can result in the involuntary termination of its tax-exempt status.

== See also ==
- Emoluments clause
