= Loft, Inc. =

American company

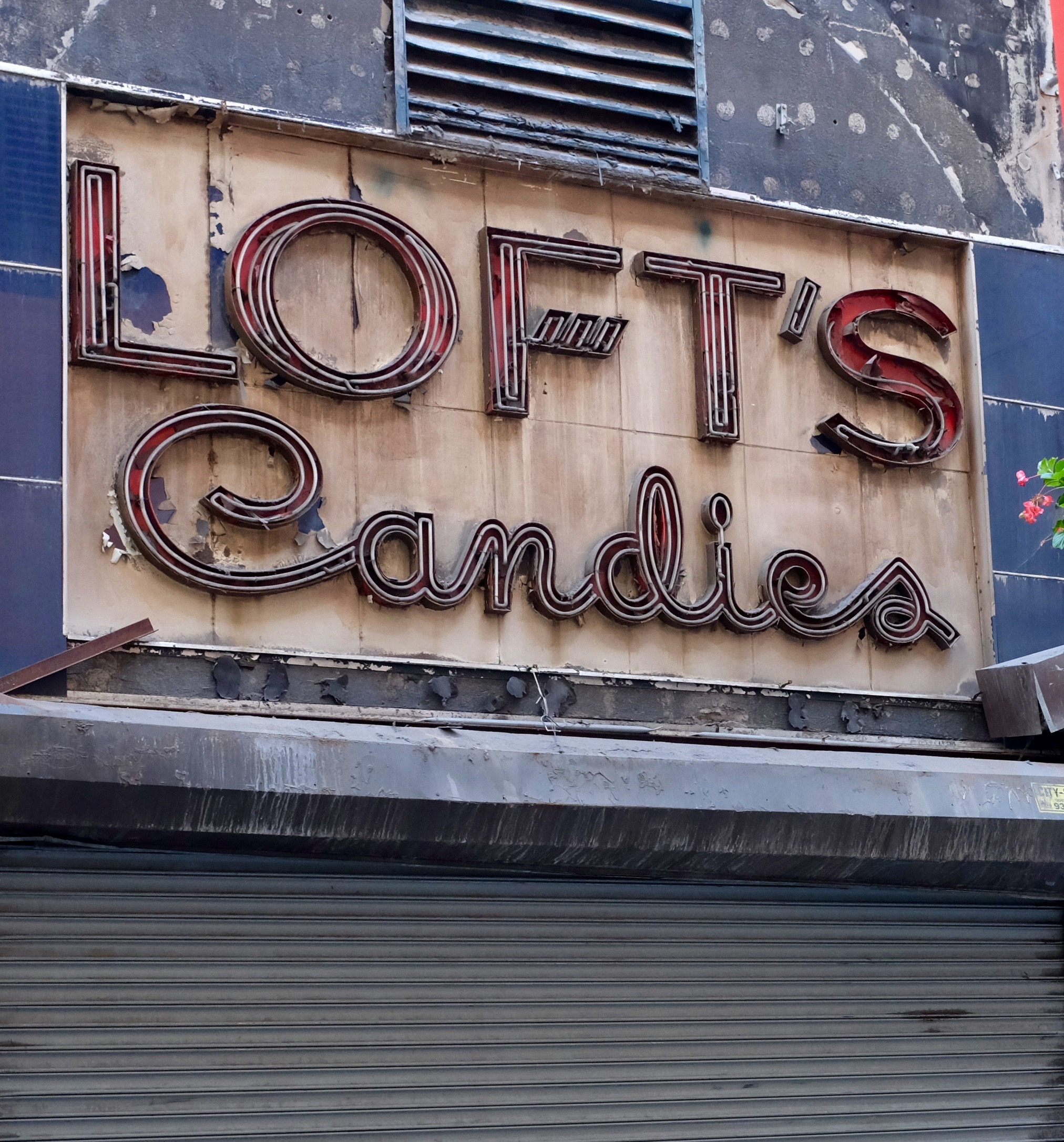
- An old neon sign for Loft's Candies at 86½ Nassau Street, Manhattan
- Trade name: Loft
- Founded: 1920
- Defunct: 1994

Loft, Inc. was the world's largest maker and seller of candy in the 1920s. It manufactured its own products and distributed them throughout greater New York City and Newark, New Jersey. Happiness Candy Stores, Inc., was controlled by Loft, Inc. Loft, Inc., merged with The Pepsi-Cola Company following an agreement of merger filed in Wilmington, Delaware in June 1941. Loft Candy Corporation was shortly spun off, acquired by Philadelphia retail magnate Albert M. Greenfield's City Stores Company chain. Rapid expansion followed, with Loft's 2,100 employees making 350 products that were distributed over fifteen states along the Eastern Seaboard and Midwest.

A decade of multiple ownership and management changes led to the company declining, accelerated by an acquisition in 1971 by the Southland Corporation. An attempt to stem the issues with the acquisition of and merger with prominent Northeastern confectioner Barricini Candies, Inc., the following year failed, and mass store closures and layoffs began. A 1976 sell-off of the combined operation to Long Island City-based B.L. Candy Company proved disastrous. By 1985 only 40 stores remained in the New York area, with all company retail outlets closing in 1988, followed by cessation of production, and corporate dissolution in 1994.

== Business history ==
In 1860, English immigrant William Loft opened a candy store in Lower Manhattan. Loft's two sons followed in his footsteps, with his eldest son George W. Loft taking charge of the company in the 1890s. George Loft soon opened two more stores, then added more in New York City as he moved production out of the family kitchen into a series of increasingly large factories, the latter of which culminated in a location in Long Island City.

On March 31, 1921, Loft, Inc., declared its initial dividend of .25 per share.

In 1934 and 1935, the company conducted an advertising and sales campaign against its competitors which was judged to be disparaging by the Federal Trade Commission. The regulatory agency ordered it to cease and desist from representing glucose used in candy, as being impure, harmful to the health, or unwholesome, or unsafe.

In 1939, a notable case, Guth v. Loft Inc., was decided in favor of Loft and against Charles Guth, president and general manager.

Loft, Inc., owned ten factory and office buildings at the northeast corner of Fortieth Avenue and Vernon Boulevard, extending to Ninth Street in Long Island City. They were sold to the Loft Realty Corporation in April 1941. The structures stood on an irregular plot which measured 400 by 450 feet. They also had a store on 55th Street and 5th Avenue in Sunset Park, Brooklyn.

Loft's candy operations were spun off from the new Pepsi-Cola Corporation in 1941, an immediate result of the Loft-Pepsi merger. The newly independent Loft Candy Corporation attracted the attention of Philadelphia magnate Albert M. Greenfield, whose City Stores Company (CSCo) rapidly acquired control of the new company. Under CSCo management (appointed by Greenfield), Loft Candy expanded into New York, New Jersey, and New England. The company also opened stores in some of the larger New York City Subway stations. By 1958, approaching the centennial of Loft's, the company owned or controlled stores in the Eastern Seaboard and the Midwest, in 11 states and the District of Columbia, with over $17 million in sales and 2,100 employees. Loft's 350 different candy products were also sold in CSCo and independent department (and smaller variety and drug) stores in an area covering 15 states and the nation's capitol.

In 1971, after having had several different managements and owners over the previous decade, the Loft Candy Corporation was acquired by Southland Corporation. A year later, Southland purchased Barricini Candies, Inc., combining it into a single operational unit with Loft Candy. In 1973, Southland closed 31 Barricini and Loft's stores in 11 states. In 1976, Southland sold the Loft-Barricini operations, along with the Long Island City manufacturing plant and approximately 200 New York area stores, to the B.L. Candy Company, Inc., of Long Island City.

By 1985, there were only 40 Loft's Candies stores in the New York area. After renaming itself the Barricini-Loft Co., Inc., in 1988, the company closed all remaining shops and ceased business in 1994.
