= Emoluments Clause =

Emoluments Clause may refer to the following clauses in the United States Constitution:

- Ineligibility Clause, Article I, Section 6, Clause 2, also called the Incompatibility Clause, affecting members of Congress
- Foreign Emoluments Clause, Article I, Section 9, Clause 8, also called the Title of Nobility Clause, affecting the executive branch
- Domestic Emoluments Clause, Article II, Section 1, Clause 7, also called the Presidential Emoluments Clause, affecting the President's salary
