= Charles Guth =

American businessman

Charles Godfrey Guth

President of Pepsi-Cola
- In office 1931-1939
- Preceded by: Roy Megargel
- Succeeded by: Walter Staunton Mack Jr.

Personal details
- Born: June 3, 1877 Philadelphia, Pennsylvania
- Died: May 24, 1948 (aged 70) Baltimore, Maryland

Charles Godfrey Guth (June 3, 1877 – May 24, 1948) was an American businessman, who, as executive of the Loft Candy Company, purchased the trademark and the syrup recipe of the twice-bankrupt Pepsi-Cola Company. He was President of Loft Candy Company from 1930 to 1935 and President of Pepsi-Cola Company from 1931 to 1939.

== Biography ==
He was born on June 3, 1877, in Baltimore, Maryland to Emil Guth of Dresden, Germany.

=== Murder of George A. Murphy ===
While living in Baltimore during September 1913, Guth was arrested for murdering George A. Murphy, an African American man who was employed as his chauffeur. The NAACP-published magazine The Crisis reported on the incident several times, and noted that Guth "killed his colored chauffeur in a dispute which arose because Guth didn't want his milk delivered at the same time as his chauffeur's." In Guth's version of events, he fired the man, and Murphy allegedly responded by trying to attack him with an axe. Guth responded by shooting Murphy dead. Guth was later cleared of all charges by both a coroner's jury and a grand jury. The NAACP noted in its annual newsletter that the "not guilty" verdict in Guth's case was "a woeful miscarriage of justice".

=== Loft Candy Company ===
In April, 1929, Charles Guth became Vice-President of the Loft Candy Company when Loft bought Mavis Candies, of which Guth was president at the time. In 1930, he was elected president at a stockholder conference where the police had to intervene to ensure it did not become a riot. He remained president of Loft until he resigned in 1935 amidst a stockholder revolt arising from his using Loft's resources to build his other company, Pepsi-Cola Company.

=== Pepsi-Cola ===
Charles Guth owned a family business, Grace Company, which made syrups for soft drinks in a plant in Baltimore, Maryland. Then, he became interested in the Pepsi-Cola Company after Coca-Cola refused to give him concessions on the sale of the cola in his drugstore. He stopped selling Coke and started selling Pepsi. When Pepsi-Cola Company went bankrupt (for the second time) on June 8, 1931, he bought the Pepsi-Cola Co. from Roy Megargel, for the price of $10,500. Megargel, however, kept a third of the 300,000 shares. Guth was also supposed to pay him a $25,000 annual royalty. Guth never paid the royalty and Megargel sued him for $11,000, even though the amount Guth owed was near $70,000. The lawsuit was settled out of court with Guth giving Megargel $35,000 and Megargel's giving Guth his 97,000 remaining shares.

However, Guth did not have any success with the company and almost declared bankruptcy himself. In a desperate bid, Guth approached Coca-Cola and offered to sell them the company but officials from Coca-Cola declined his offer, not even placing a bid. In 1935 he moved the entire company to Long Island City, New York.

After Loft chemists changed the recipe "more to his liking", Guth negotiated a contract to bottle Pepsi in a six ounce bottle. After the product still failed to become a success, he introduced Pepsi in a twelve-ounce format but with the same price as the six ounce drink. By 1933, Pepsi-Cola was sold in 313 stores in the United States and in 83 other countries. By 1936, his company was making two million dollars of profit and had become the second largest soda company. That year alone, 500 million bottles of the cola were consumed.

=== Lawsuit ===
In 1935, Loft sued Guth for breaching his duty of loyalty to the company by failing to sell the syrup formula to Loft, and instead appropriating it for himself. Loft argued that while its president, Guth used Loft's assets, credit, finances, facilities and employees to build up the other company. Guth argued that the opportunity came to him personally and that it was out of Loft's business sector. Loft sued for the 237,500 shares that Guth owned (91% of Pepsi-Cola's total shares). He remained president of Pepsi during the process. In 1939, the Delaware Supreme Court rendered the verdict in favor of Loft.

Guth was then removed from the board and replaced with Walter Mack. He was also ordered to give Loft $475,000. However, he remained general manager while he appealed the verdict. He left Pepsi shortly before his appeal was denied. Loft merged with Pepsi in 1941, but kept the Pepsi-Cola name.

In American corporation law, the Guth rule now stipulates that no representative of a company should take a business opportunity for himself if the corporation is doing well enough financially to carry out the action, if the corporation is interested in it or if it is reasonably expected that the opportunity will do well and the opportunity is in the company's line of business.

=== Noxie-Kola ===
After leaving Pepsi he worked for Noxie-Kola.

=== Death ===
He died on May 24, 1948, in Baltimore, Maryland.
