= Konrad Schiemann =

German-British barrister and judge

Sir Konrad Hermann Theodor Schiemann, PC (born 15 September 1937) is a former German-British barrister and judge. He served on the Court of Appeal, and he was also a member of the Court of Justice of the European Union.

Schiemann was born in Berlin in 1937 to Helmut Schiemann and Beate von Simson. His father was killed during the Second World War, but he and his mother escaped to Munich. After his mother died, he emigrated to England to live with an uncle in 1946. He was educated at King Edward's School, Birmingham, Freiburg University, and Pembroke College, Cambridge. In 1965, he married Elisabeth Hanna Eleonore Holroyd-Reece, daughter of publisher John Holroyd-Reece.

== Judgments in Court of Justice of the European Union, the European Court of Human Rights and the Court of Appeal of England and Wales ==
- C338/04 – Placanica – Articles 43 EC and 49 EC precludes national legislation, which imposes a criminal penalty on persons for pursuing the organised activity of collecting bets without a licence or a police authorisation as required under the national legislation, where those persons were unable to obtain licences or authorisations because that Member State, in breach of Community law, refused to grant licences or authorisations to such persons.
- Lucchini C119/05- Community law precludes the application of a provision of national law, such as Article 2909 of the Italian Codice Civile (Civil Code), which seeks to lay down the principle of res judicata in so far as the application of that provision prevents the recovery of State aid granted in breach of Community law which has been found to be incompatible with the common market in a decision of the Commission of the European Communities which has become final.
- C 40/06 – Winner – Organisation of bets on sporting competitions subject to a public monopoly at Land level – Decision of the Bundesverfassungsgericht finding the legislation for such a monopoly incompatible with the German Basic Law, but maintaining the legislation in force during a transitional period designed to allow it to be brought into conformity with the Basic Law – Principle of the primacy of Union law – Admissibility of, and possible conditions for, a transitional period of that type where the national legislation concerned also infringes Articles 43 EC and 49 EC.
- FIAMM C-120-06P – Recommendations and rulings of the World Trade Organisation (WTO) Dispute Settlement Body – Determination of the Dispute Settlement Body that the Community regime governing the import of bananas was incompatible with WTO rules – Imposition by the United States of America of retaliatory measures in the form of increased customs duty levied on imports of certain products from various Member States – Retaliatory measures authorised by the WTO – No non-contractual Community liability – Duration of the proceedings before the Court of First Instance – Reasonable period – Claim for fair compensation)
- ČES C-115/08 – Action for cessation of actual or potential nuisance caused to land by the activities of a nuclear power plant situated on the territory of another Member State – Obligation to tolerate actual or potential nuisance caused by installations which have been officially authorised in the Member State where the action is brought -
- Opinion 1/08 – GATS pursuant to Article 300(6) EC – General Agreement on Trade in Services (GATS) – Schedules of specific commitments – Conclusion of agreements on the grant of compensation for modification and withdrawal of certain commitments following the accession of new Member States to the European Union – Shared competence – Legal bases – Common commercial policy – Common transport policy.
- Chapman v United Kingdom Application 27238/95 – the planning authorities were entitled to come to the conclusion that environmental concerns specific to the site outweighed humanitarian concerns specific to the gypsy applicant who wished to leave her caravan on the site.
- R v S/S for Transport ex p. Factortame [1998] EWCA Civ 1971 – An applicant can be entitled to damages for breach of European Union law even if that damage was inflicted pursuant to a UK Act of Parliament.
- Geraghty v Awad [1999] EWCA Civ 3002 – enforceability of conditional fee agreement
- R v Newham and Manik Bibi [2001] EWCA 607 – a Housing Authority can be under a duty to consider the applicants' applications for suitable housing on the basis that they have a legitimate expectation that they will be provided by the Authority with suitable accommodation on a secure tenancy.
- Vellino v Chief Constable of Greater Manchester [2001] EWCA Civ 1249 – a person escaping from police custody can not sue the police for breach of a duty to detain him.
- Rusbridger v Attorney-General [2002] EWCA Civ 397 – Permission given to argue that a declaration should be made that section 3 of the 1848 TreasonAct is incompatible with the Human Rights Act 1998
