= Keech v Sandford =

English trusts law case

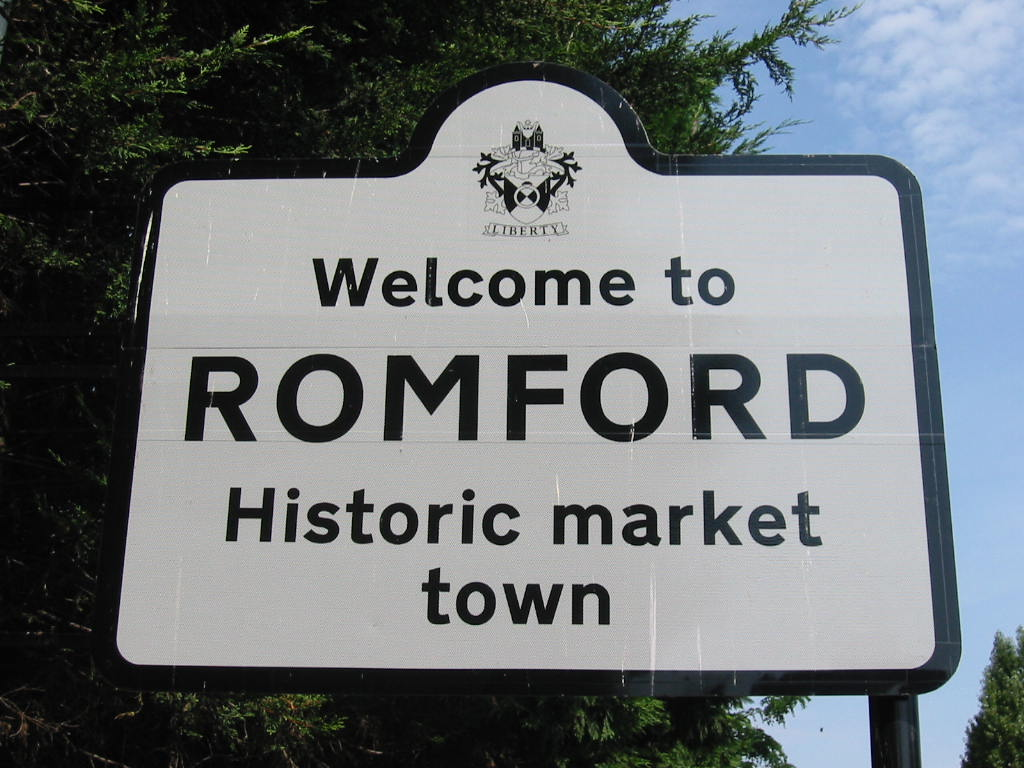
- Court: Exchequer Court
- Decided: 31 October 1726
- Citation: (1726) Sel Cas Ch 61, 25 ER 223, [1558-1774] All ER Rep 230 [1726] EWHC Ch J76
- Transcript: Full text of judgment on Bailii

Court membership
- Judge sitting: Lord King LC

Keywords
- Strict liability, fiduciary duty, conflict of interest

Keech v Sandford [1726] EWHC J76 is a foundational case, deriving from English trusts law, on the fiduciary duty of loyalty. It concerns the law of trusts and has affected much of the thinking on directors' duties in company law. It holds that a trustee owes a strict duty of loyalty so that there can never be a possibility of any conflict of interest.

The case's importance derives partly from its historical context, with the South Sea Bubble. Lord King LC, who decided the case, replaced the former Lord Chancellor, Thomas Parker, 1st Earl of Macclesfield who was tried and found guilty in 1725 for accepting bribes and speculating with and losing client money in the South Sea crash. Lord Macclesfield had, probably not coincidentally, previously held that a fiduciary was entitled to take money from a trust, invest it on their own behalf, and keep the profit, if they restored money to the trust. Keech reversed this, and the law in England and the UK has maintained a strict opposition to any possibility of a conflict of interest ever since. The remedy of granting a constructive trust over property, and the strict approach that all possibility of a conflict of interest was to be avoided, derived from the general outrage at the time.

== Facts ==
A child had inherited the lease on Romford Market near London. Mr Sandford was entrusted to look after this property until the child matured. But before then, the lease expired. The landlord had told Mr Sandford that he did not want the child to have the renewed lease. There was clear evidence of the refusal to renew for the benefit of the infant. Yet the landlord was happy (apparently) to give Mr Sandford the opportunity of the lease instead. Mr Sandford took it. When the child (now Mr Keech) grew up, he sued Mr Sandford for the profit that he had been making by getting the market's lease.

A person being possessed of a lease of … a market, devised his estate to trustee in trust for the infant; before the expiration of the term the trustee applied to the lessor for a renewal for the benefit of the infant, which he refused, … there was clear proof of the refusal to renew for the benefit of the infant, on which the trustee sets a lease made to himself.

== Judgment ==
The Lord Chancellor, Lord King ordered Mr Sandford should disgorge his profits. He wrote,

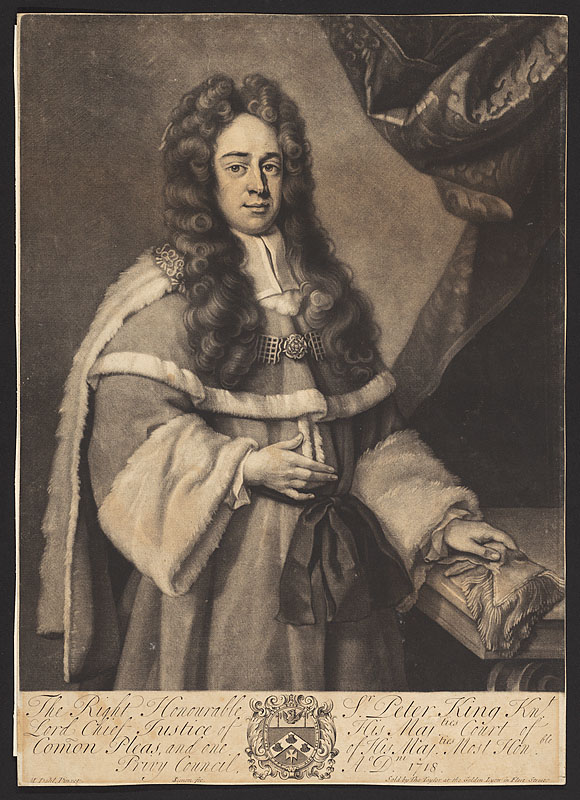
Lord Chancellor King

I must consider this as a trust for the infant, for I very well see, if a trustee, on the refusal to renew, might have a lease to himself, few trust-estates would be renewed to the cestui que use; though I do not say there is a fraud in this case, yet [the trustee] should rather have let it run out, than to have had the lease to himself. This may seem hard, that the trustee is the only person of all mankind who might not have the lease: but it is very proper that rule should be strictly pursued, and not in the least relaxed; for it is very obvious what would be the consequence of letting trustees have the lease, on refusal to renew to cestui que use. So decreed, that the lease should be assigned to the infant, and that the trustee should be indemnified from any covenants comprised in the lease, and an account of the profits made since the renewal.

== Significance ==
Mr Sandford was meant to be trusted, but he put himself in a position of conflict of interest. Lord King LC was worried that trustees might exploit opportunities to use trust property for themselves instead of looking after it. Business speculators using trusts had just recently caused a stock market crash. Strict duties for trustees made their way into company law and were applied to directors and chief executive officers.

The principle of strict and absolute duties of loyalty laid down in Keech was a decisive break with prior case law, seen in Holt v Holt, Rushworth's Case, and Walley v Walley.

The influence of Keech has reached beyond the duties of trustees, into the fiduciary duties of company directors. The approach being taken in England (cf. the position in Delaware corporate law) is that any possibility of a conflict of interest means a breach of trust - unless the beneficiary of the trust consented to the conflict.

== See also ==
- Corporate law
- UK company law
- United States corporate law
- English trusts law
- Business judgment rule
- Whelpdale v Cookson (1747) 1 Ves Sen 9; 27 ER 856
- Parker v McKenna (1874–75) LR 10 Ch App 96, per James LJ that the rule is necessary for "the safety of mankind"
- Re Whiteley (1886) 33 Ch D 347
- Bray v Ford [1896] AC 44 at 51–52, per Lord Herschell, the no possibility of conflict rule is "based upon the consideration that, human nature being what it is, there is danger of the person holding a fiduciary position being swayed by interest rather than duty…."
- Regal (Hastings) Ltd v Gulliver [1942] 1 ALL ER 378
- Boardman v Phipps [1967] 2 AC 46
- Industrial Development Consultants v Cooley [1972] 1 WLR 443
- Oxford v Moss (1978) 68 Cr App R 183, information is not property under Theft Act 1968 s 4
- Guinness plc v Saunders [1990] 2 AC 663
- Bhullar v Bhullar [2003] EWCA Civ 424; 2 BCLC 241
