= Gencor ACP Ltd v Dalby =

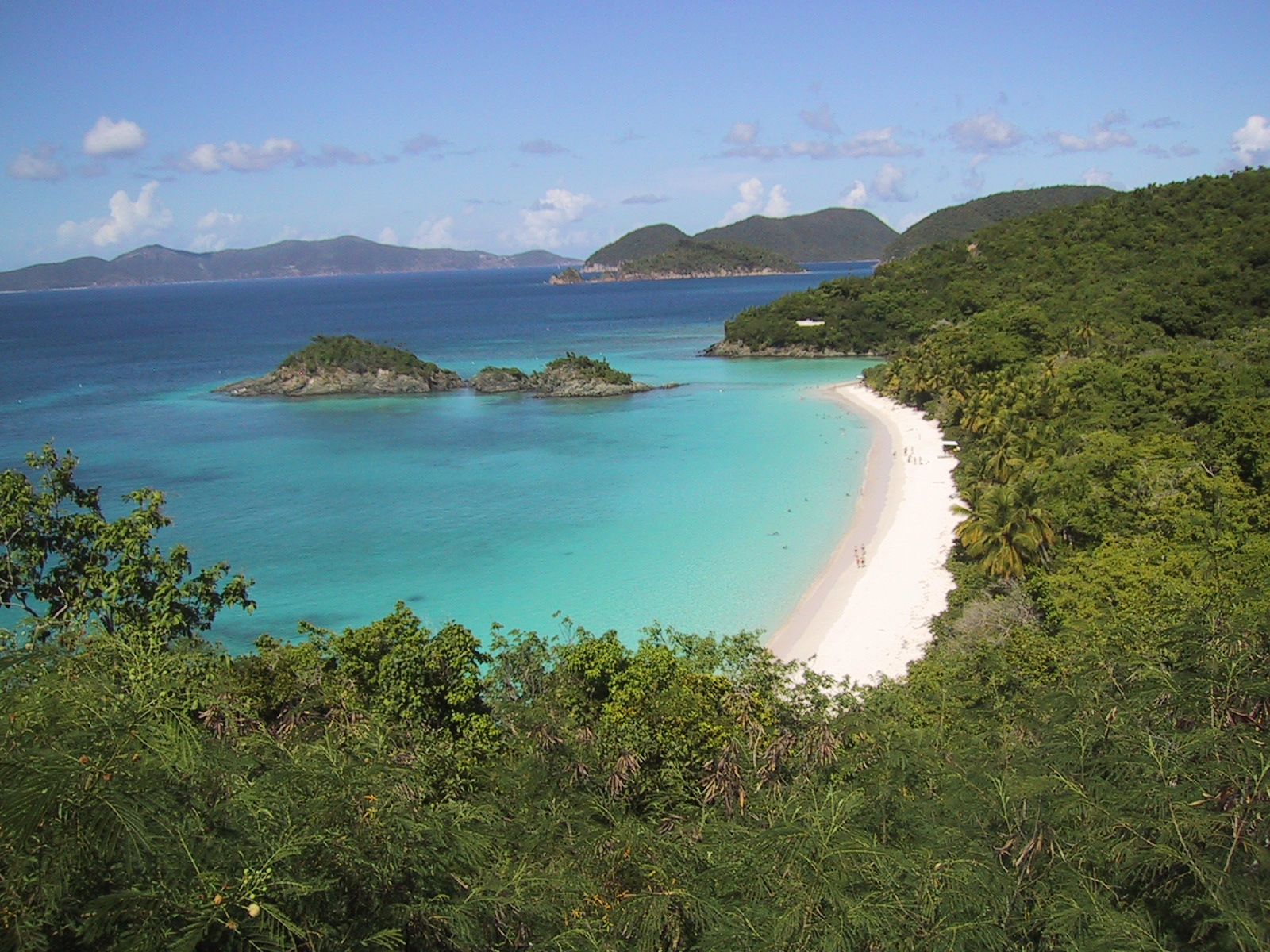
- Court: High Court of Justice, Chancery Division
- Full case name: Gencor ACP Ltd & Others v Dalby & Others
- Decided: July 27, 2000
- Citations: [2000] EWHC 1560 (Ch), [2000] 2 BCLC 734

Court membership
- Judge sitting: Rimer J

Case opinions
- Rimer J

Keywords
- Piercing the corporate veil, dishonest assistance

Gencor ACP Ltd v Dalby [2000] EWHC 1560 (Ch) is a UK company law case concerning piercing the corporate veil.

== Facts ==
Mr Dalby was a director of the ACP group of companies, including Gencor ACP Ltd. He dishonestly diverted assets and opportunities to his British Virgin Islands company. Gencor ACP sought to force him and his company to repay the money. He also paid his son £24,000 a year for work, even though the son was still in school.

== Judgment ==
Rimer J held that Mr Dalby and the offshore company must return the benefits. Mr Dalby could only have escaped liability if he had obtained the consent of ACP's shareholders for his actions. Both Mr Dalby and his Virgin Islands company were liable to account to ACP for the diverted money and lifting the corporate veil on the Virgin Islands company was appropriate since it was directly controlled by Mr Dalby and in reality functioned as his offshore bank account.

The payment to Mr Dalby's son was invalid because it was an unauthorised salary increase, in effect, for Mr Dalby. He had made the arrangement to reduce his tax liability.

== See also ==
- UK company law
- Lifting the corporate veil
