= Corporate opportunity =

Legal obligation on corporate officials

The corporate opportunity doctrine is the legal principle providing that directors, officers, and controlling shareholders of a corporation must not take for themselves any business opportunity that could benefit the corporation. The corporate opportunity doctrine is one application of the fiduciary duty of loyalty.

== Application ==
The corporate opportunity doctrine does not apply to all fiduciaries of a corporation; rather, it is limited to directors, officers, and controlling shareholders. The doctrine applies regardless of whether the corporation is harmed by the transaction; indeed, it applies even if the corporation benefits from the transaction. The corporate opportunity doctrine only applies if the opportunity was not disclosed to the corporation. If the opportunity was disclosed to the board of directors and the board declined to take the opportunity for the corporation, the fiduciary may take the opportunity for themself. When the corporate opportunity doctrine applies, the corporation is entitled to all profits earned by the fiduciary from the transaction. In the leading English law case of Regal (Hastings) Ltd v Gulliver [1942] UKHL 1 it was held that "The rule of equity which insists on those who by use of a fiduciary position make a profit, being liable to account for that profit, in no way depends on fraud, or absence of bona fides ... or whether the plaintiff has in fact been damaged or benefited by his action."

== Elements ==
A business opportunity is a corporate opportunity if the corporation is financially able to undertake the opportunity, the opportunity is within the corporation's line of business, and the corporation has an interest or expectancy in the opportunity. The Delaware Court of Chancery has stated, "An opportunity is within a corporation's line of business . . . if it is an activity as to which the corporation has fundamental knowledge, practical experience and ability to pursue." In In re eBay, Inc. Shareholders Litigation, investing in various securities was held to be in a line of business of eBay despite the fact that eBay's primary purpose is to provide an online auction platform. Investing was in a line of business of eBay because eBay "consistently invested a portion of its cash on hand in marketable securities." A corporation has an interest or expectancy in a business opportunity if the opportunity would further an established business policy of the corporation.

== See also ==
- Fiduciary duty
- Duty of loyalty
- Self-dealing
