= Parker v McKenna =

- Court: Court of Appeal of England and Wales
- Decided: 14 December 1874
- Citation: (1874-75) LR 10 Ch App 96

Court membership
- Judges sitting: Lord Cairns LC, Sir WM James LJ and Sir G Mellish LJ

Parker v McKenna (1874–75) LR 10 Ch App 96 is a UK company law case, concerning the rule against having any conflict of interest.

== Facts ==
Mr McKenna was one of four directors of the National Bank of Ireland, a joint stock bank. In 1864 resolutions were passed to increase the capital by issuing 20,000 £50 shares. They were to be offered to old shareholders first according to how many they already held, for a £25 premium and £5 as a first call. Any not bought would be sold by directors at a £30 premium. The directors allotted 9778 shares to a Mr Stock, who paid only £5 a share. It was arranged that the certificates would be withheld, the bank had a lien on the shares for the premiums and no transfer could be made till £30 was paid up. He then said he could not take so many and asked the directors to relieve him. They took many at £30 a share, and then sold them on at a profit. The £30 per share was always paid to the bank.

== Judgment ==
Lord Cairns LC, Sir WM James LJ and Sir G Mellish LJ held that the directors had to account for all profits made through the sale of the shares.

James LJ made this famous statement:

I desire to add but little to what the Lord Chancellor has said. I do not think it is necessary, but it appears to me very important, that we should concur in laying down again and again the general principle that in this Court no agent in the course of his agency, in the matter of his agency, can be allowed to make any profit without the knowledge and consent of his principal; that that rule is an inflexible rule, and must be applied inexorably by this Court, which is not entitled, in my judgment, to receive evidence, or suggestion, or argument as to whether the principal did or did not suffer any injury in fact by reason of the dealing of the agent; for the safety of mankind requires that no agent shall be able to put his principal to the danger of such an inquiry as that.

There is, however, on the other side a general principle as to the costs of the suit. It is not because a person has made himself liable to proceedings in equity or proceedings at law that the adverse litigant is entitled to make the Court the place, and the proceedings of the Court the means, by which personal spite or party hostility is enabled to indulge itself in unfounded aspersions upon character. In my opinion that has been done here. Unfounded aspersions have been wantonly and recklessly made, and the consequence of that is that this Court is obliged to give effect to what it has so often said it would do—make persons so dealing with the proceedings of this Court pay, and pay fully, in costs for it. I am of opinion, therefore, that the Plaintiff must pay the costs of so much of the proceedings as the Lord Chancellor has pointed out, and that he has so mixed that up with the rest of the suit that he has forfeited, in my opinion, his title to the costs which he otherwise would have been entitled to receive. I am of opinion, therefore, that the decree proposed by the Lord Chancellor is right in both those respects.

I also say for myself that I agree in what has been said with regard to the dealings with the Fox shares, that I could not satisfactorily to my own mind have disposed of that part of the case upon the materials before us.

== See also ==
- Companies Act 2006, s 175
- Bray v Ford
