= Whelpdale v Cookson =

English trusts law case

- Court: Court of Chancery
- Citation: (1747) 1 Ves Sen 9; 27 ER 856

Case opinions
- Lord Hardwicke

Keywords
- Trusts

Whelpdale v Cookson (1747) 27 ER 856 is an English trusts law case, also relevant for UK company law, on the duty of loyalty owed by a trustee to beneficiaries of the trust.

== Facts ==
A trustee purchased land that was owned by the trust.

== Judgment ==
Lord Hardwicke gave the judgment of the court. The text in the English Report reads as follows.

Trustee not to derive advantage from a purchase of trust property.

On devise of lands in trust for payment of debts, the trustee himself parchases part. Lord Chancellor said, he would not allow it to stand good, although another person being the best bidder bought it for him at a public sale; for he knew the dangerous consequence: nor is it enough for the trustee to say, you cannot prove any fraud as it is in his own power to conceal it; but if the majority of creditors agreed to allow it, he should not be afraid of making the precedent. (Reg. Lib. 1746, B. fol. 552)

(Note: The substance of the decree is in 5 Ves. 682. For a statement of the particulars of the case, the directions more at length, and a reference to the general law on such subjects, see the Supplement, p.8, &c., to which add Gibson v. Jeyes, 6 Ves. 266. Wood v. Downes, 18 Ves. 120. Montesquieu v. Sandy, 18 Ves. 302, 313.)

== See also ==
- Keech v Sandford
