= Regal (Hastings) Ltd v Gulliver =

Leading case in UK company law

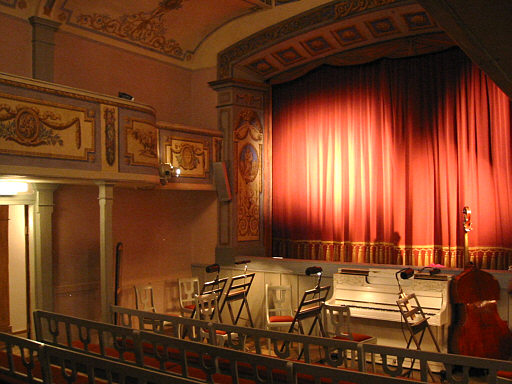
- Court: House of Lords
- Decided: 20 February 1942
- Citation: [1942] UKHL 1, [1942] 1 All ER 378, [1967] 2 AC 134,
- Transcript: Full text of decision from BAILII.org

Court membership
- Judges sitting: Viscount Sankey; Lord Russell of Killowen; Lord Macmillan; Lord Wright; Lord Porter

Case opinions
- Lord Russell, Lord Wright

Keywords
- Conflict of interest, directors' duties, corporate opportunity

Regal (Hastings) Ltd v Gulliver [1967] 1 All ER 37 is a leading case in UK company law regarding the rule against directors and officers from taking personal advantage of a corporate opportunity in violation of their duty of loyalty to the company. Reversing the decisions of the High Court and the Court of Appeal, the House of Lords held in 1942 that a director is in breach of his duties if he takes advantage of an opportunity that the corporation would otherwise be interested in but was unable to take advantage. However the breach could have been resolved by ratification by the shareholders, which those involved neglected to do.

== Facts ==
The plaintiff company, Regal, owned and operated a cinema in Hastings, Sussex. On 26 September 1935, the directors of the company formed a new subsidiary, Hastings Amalgamated Cinemas Limited, to acquire the leases of two other local cinemas – the Cinema de Luxe in Hastings and the Elite in St Leonards-on-Sea. However, the landlord of the two cinemas did not want to grant the leases to Amalgamated without a personal guarantee from the directors, which they were unwilling to provide.

Instead the landlord said they could up share capital to £5,000. Regal itself put in £2,000, but could not afford more (though it could have got a loan). Four directors each put in £500, the Chairman, Mr Gulliver, got outside subscribers to put in £500 and the board asked the company solicitor, Mr Garten, to put in the last £500. They sold the business and made a profit of nearly £3 per share.

== Proceedings ==
The beneficiaries brought an action against the directors, saying that this profit was in breach of their fiduciary duty to the company. They had not fully obtained the consent from the shareholders.

== Judgment ==
The House of Lords, reversing the High Court and the Court of Appeal, held that the defendants had made their profits “by reason of the fact that they were directors of Regal and in the course of the execution of that office”. They therefore had to account for their profits to the company. The governing principle was succinctly stated by Lord Russell of Killowen:

“The rule of equity which insists on those who by use of a fiduciary position make a profit, being liable to account for that profit, in no way depends on fraud, or absence of bona fides; or upon questions or considerations as whether the property would or should otherwise have gone to the plaintiff, or whether he took a risk or acted as he did for the benefit of the plaintiff, or whether the plaintiff has in fact been damaged or benefited by his action. The liability arises from the mere fact of a profit having, in the stated circumstances, been made.”

Lord Wright said (at 157),

"The Court of Appeal held that, in the absence of any dishonest intention, or negligence, or breach of a specific duty to acquire the shares for the appellant company, the respondents as directors were entitled to buy the shares themselves. Once, it was said, they came to a bona fide decision that the appellant company could not provide the money to take up the shares, their obligation to refrain from acquiring those shares for themselves came to an end. With the greatest respect, I feel bound to regard such a conclusion as dead in the teeth of the wise and salutary rule so stringently enforced in the authorities. It is suggested that it would have been mere quixotic folly for the four respondents to let such an occasion pass when the appellant company could not avail itself of it; Lord King, L.C., faced that very position when he accepted that the person in the fiduciary position might be the only person in the world who could not avail himself of the opportunity."

== Reporting ==
Even though it was a House of Lords decision, and is now regarded as one of the seminal cases on directors' duties, the decision was not reported in the official law reports until nearly 26 years after the decision was handed down. During the intervening period, it was only reported in the All England Law Reports.

The judgments of the High Court and the Court of Appeals were never reported, possibly due to difficulties during the Second World War. The oral judgment of the High Court was interrupted by an air raid warning.

== See also ==
- Guth v. Loft, the Delaware decision that deviated from the strict approach.
- Keech v Sandford, the rule of equity that has been the bedrock of fiduciary duties for 280 years.
- Ex parte James (1803) 32 ER 385
