= Canadian corporate law =

Operation of corporations in Canada

Canadian corporate law concerns the operation of corporations in Canada, which can be established under either federal or provincial authority.

Federal incorporation of for-profit corporations is governed by Corporations Canada under the Canada Business Corporations Act. All of the Canadian provinces and territories also have laws permitting (and governing) the incorporation of corporations within their area of jurisdiction. Often, the choice of whether to incorporate federally or provincially will be based on many business considerations, such as scope of business and the desire for application of particular rules which may be available under one corporate statute but not another.

== History ==
Prior to Canadian Confederation, companies were organized through several procedures:

- through contract as a partnership or unincorporated company
- through royal charter, as was done for the Hudson's Bay Company
- through an Act of the Parliament of the United Kingdom, as for the Canada Company
- by an Act of the local legislature
- formation as a joint stock company without limited liability under the laws of the applicable colony (first introduced in Lower Canada in 1849 for limited purposes, extended to other types of business in the Province of Canada in 1850)

Before 1862, limited liability was the exception, being conferred on specific companies through royal charter or special Act. When it was introduced into UK company law by the Companies Act 1862 as a matter of general application, the Canadian colonies introduced legislation to enable the same locally.

Upon Confederation, s. 92(11) of the Constitution Act, 1867 gave provinces jurisdiction over "Incorporation of Companies with Provincial Objects." The judicial construction of this phrase has been the subject of several significant cases in the courts, and most notably at the Judicial Committee of the Privy Council:

- In 1881, in Citizen's Insurance Co. v. Parsons, it was held that the Parliament of Canada had authority to incorporate companies with objects of greater scope.
- In 1914, in John Deere, it was held that the provinces could not interfere with a federally incorporated company by requiring them to be registered locally in order to conduct business.
- In 1916, in Bonanza Creek, it was held that "provincial objects" did not restrict a company's operations to the province of incorporation, so long as it was licensed or registered to operate in another jurisdiction, and its incorporating Act allowed for that to occur.

The first Federal and Provincial Acts generally provided for incorporation through letters patent, but the procedure was excluded federally for certain classes of company (such as railways and banks), which still had to be incorporated by special Act of Parliament. It was in this manner that the Canadian Pacific Railway was originally formed.

Current Acts (such as the Canada Business Corporations Act) generally provide for formation by articles of incorporation, but Prince Edward Island still retains the letters patent procedure and Nova Scotia provides for incorporation by memorandum of association.

== Corporations Canada ==
Corporations Canada
Agency overview
- Headquarters: Ottawa, Ontario
- Parent department: Innovation, Science and Economic Development Canada
- Key document: Canada Business Corporations Act
- Website: ic.gc.ca/eic/site/cd-dgc.nsf/

Corporations Canada is Canada's federal corporate regulator, operating under Innovation, Science and Economic Development Canada. It is responsible for administering laws regarding the incorporation of Canadian businesses as well as "corporate laws governing federal companies, except for financial intermediaries." (Financial institutions are incorporated by the Office of the Superintendent of Financial Institutions.)

It has the authority to dissolve a corporation that has not filed its annual returns. Corporations Canada is responsible for the administering the following laws:

- Canada Business Corporations Act
- Canada Cooperatives Act
- Boards of Trade Act
- Canada Not-for-Profit Corporations Act

== Corporate governance ==
=== Board of directors ===
The articles of incorporation can provide for different classes of shares (which may carry the right to elect separate directors). Like most of the Commonwealth and Europe, the "one share, one vote" principle prevails in public companies, but cumulative voting can occur where the articles of incorporation so provide.

Shareholders must elect directors at each annual meeting, and, where the articles are silent, directors remain in office until the annual meeting after their election. after incorporation (at which time the initial directors are simply registered). There can be staggered boards, but any director's term is limited to three annual meetings. Directors elected by a particular class cannot be removed without consent of that class. All changes in directors have to be filed with the registrar.

Where a company's securities are traded publicly on the Toronto Stock Exchange, from 31 December 2012, it is required to:

- elect its directors individually, as opposed to electing a slate,
- hold annual elections, as opposed elections for multi-year and/or staggered terms,
- disclose annually whether it has adopted a majority voting policy for uncontested director elections, and if not, explain why, and
- after each meeting at which directors have been elected, notify the TSX if a director has received a majority of "withhold" votes (if it has not adopted such a policy), and promptly issue a press release disclosing the voting results.

In October 2012, the TSX also issued a proposal to require majority voting at uncontested elections.

The larger pension plans and other investment funds have instituted practices relating to the behaviour that is expected of the companies they invest in. Publications in that regard include:

- Proxy Voting Principles and Guidelines
- 2013 Best Practices for Proxy Circular Disclosure
- Proxy Voting by Canadian Mutual Funds 2006–2009

On September 29, 2016 the Financial Post reported that a "Bill introduced in Parliament would vanquish 'zombie' directors who fail to win majority shareholder votes"

=== Board structure ===
Directors set their own remuneration. They have a fiduciary duty to not put their own interests first when setting it. Some case law exists where decisions about remuneration were not reached fairly, or where directors' fees are unusually high, thus attracting oppression remedy claims under the various corporate statutes. Otherwise the remuneration committee should be composed of independent directors. There is no say on pay rule in the CBCA. However, a large number of Canadian companies have been having say on pay votes, as a result of shareholder proposals to change company constitutions in order to introduce them.

For publicly traded companies, the Canadian Securities Administrators have issued various National Instruments that have been implemented to varying degrees by the provincial and territorial securities regulators in order to assure better-functioning boards. They include:

- 51-102: Continuous Disclosure Obligations
- 52-109: Certification of Disclosure in Issuers' Annual and Interim Filings
- 52-110: Audit Committees
- 58-101: Disclosure of Corporate Governance Practices, the Canadian implementation of the practices recommended by the UK Cadbury Report, made mandatory by the Toronto Stock Exchange for listed companies.

=== Shareholder rights ===
Under s. 140(1) of the CBCA, all shareholders have the right to vote. Shareholders holding the same class of shares must be treated equally, and so, for instance, no voting ceilings are allowed.

With 5% of the voting rights, known as a requisition, shareholders may require directors to call a meeting. Uniquely, under s. 137 of the CBCA:

- a beneficial holder of shares may submit a proposal (which may include nominations to the board of directors), even though she is not a registered owner of shares. This means a broad group of people who sit behind investment dealers or other intermediaries in the investment chain are now enfranchised.
- any shareholder can make a proposal, a brief statement of which must be included with notices of meetings, but it can be refused if it "does not relate in a significant way to the business or affairs of the corporation," or "the rights conferred by this section are being abused to secure publicity" and under s. 137(8) the only way to challenge this is by application to a court. The proposal also has to not have been submitted within the last 5 years, if the last time it got less than 3%, 6% or 10% of the votes (depending on how often it had previously been submitted). Before 2001 there was a prohibition on proposals for economic, political, racial, religious or social causes, but this has since been repealed.
- careful preparation is required in order to succeed in getting a proposal approved at a shareholders' meeting, especially where it calls for the replacement of the existing board
- otherwise, the directors determine what goes on the meeting and proxy solicitation agenda

While a starting point of Canadian companies is that directors "manage or supervise the management of, the business and affairs of a corporation", shareholders may unanimously agree to do a corporate act, regardless of what directors think. Shareholders can amend the articles with a three-quarters majority vote.

Political donations by corporations (and trade unions) have been prohibited since the Federal Accountability Act repealed s. 404.1 of the Canada Elections Act in 2006.

=== Directors' duties ===
The laws in the various jurisdictions governing the duties of directors generally follow that laid out in s. 122 of the CBCA:

122. (1) Every director and officer of a corporation in exercising their powers and discharging their duties shall

(a) act honestly and in good faith with a view to the best interests of the corporation; and
(b) exercise the care, diligence and skill that a reasonably prudent person would exercise in comparable circumstances.

(2) Every director and officer of a corporation shall comply with this Act, the regulations, articles, by-laws and any unanimous shareholder agreement.
(3) Subject to subsection 146(5), no provision in a contract, the articles, the by-laws or a resolution relieves a director or officer from the duty to act in accordance with this Act or the regulations or relieves them from liability for a breach thereof.

Extensive jurisprudence in the Canadian courts have expanded on the matter:

- In Peoples Department Stores Inc. (Trustee of) v. Wise it was held that the duty is not merely owed to the corporation itself, but also to corporate stakeholders, namely "shareholders, employees, suppliers, creditors, consumers, governments and the environment.: This duty is not mandatory. The main directors' duties under Canadian corporate law is the duty of care, and then avoiding conflicts of interest, which include primarily of engaging in undisclosed self-dealing, taking unauthorized corporate opportunities, competing with the company, and being enriched in a takeover bid.
- A director has to meet a minimum standard of care, regardless of how clever or incompetent he is. It has also been implied by the case law, that if directors have special skills or qualifications, this will raise the standard expected further above the minimum. In UPM-Kymmene Corp v UPM-Kymmene Miramichi Inc the board approved a large pay package for the chair and major shareholder, Mr Berg, after a seven-minute meeting of the compensation committee, and a 30-minute discussion on the full board. This was not long enough to consider the issues, properly inform themselves about the package, especially given their own compensation consultants, and the former compensation committee, had expressed serious concerns. Neither was this an issue of "business judgment" because that can logically only apply where some real judgment has in fact been exercised, where the board has "been scrupulous in its deliberations and demonstrated diligence in arriving at decisions."

Within the general duty to avoid conflicts of interest there is a duty for directors and officers to disclose self-dealing. A director has to disclose a material interest in any transaction the company enters into. The same strict standard as in the UK applies to this day, so even having a close friendship with someone that benefits from a company contract counts. They must state any conflict of interest that may result from the conclusion of a contract with a third party, and if they do not respect this obligation any shareholder or interested person may ask for the annulment of the decision taken. If a breach of duty has already taken place, the Canadian rules on ex post shareholder approval provide that a shareholder resolution does not affect the invalidity of a transaction and the liability of the director, but it may be taken into account when the court decides whether or not to let a derivative action continue by a minority shareholder. The position on taking corporate opportunities begins with the case of Cook v Deeks, where directors must have authorization by independent directors before they try to make any profit out of their office, when the company itself could possibly have an interest in the same deal.

More modern cases show some differences in the strictness of the courts' approach:

- In Peso Silver Mines Ltd. (N.P.L.) v. Cropper the board, after getting advice, turned down mining claims because it lacked funds. A director, Mr Cropper, formed a company and bought them. Later, the company sued him. The Supreme Court of Canada held that there had been no breach in this case, since the company had positively decided not to take that opportunity, and just because the director found out about the opportunity whilst in his office did not mean the opportunity had to be turned over to the company.
- Another leading case is Canadian Aero Service Ltd. v. O'Malley where two directors, Mr O'Malley and Mr Zarzacki worked for a mapping and exploring business, and got involved in a project to map Guyana. They resigned, started a new company, Terra Surveys, and bid for a government tender to continue the work. The Supreme Court of Canada held that the proper questions to ask were whether the opportunity was closely connected to the company, and what relationship the directors had to the opportunity.

Tripartite Fiduciary Duty and the Principle of Fair Treatment

A detailed examination of the Court's language [in BCE Inc. v. 1976 Debentureholders] reveals that the duty of directors in Canada to 'act honestly and in good faith with a view to the best interests of the corporation' is an implied three-part fiduciary duty, which operationalizes the principle of fair treatment.

== Corporate litigation ==
In addition to being initiated by the corporation, litigation can be exercised through either derivative actions or the oppression remedy (the latter available federally and in all provinces other than Prince Edward Island). The two types of action are not mutually exclusive, and the differences between them were noted in 1991:

A derivative action is commonly said to arise where it is the corporation that is injured by the alleged wrongdoing. The "corporation" will be injured when all shareholders are affected equally, with none experiencing any special harm. By contrast, in a personal (or "direct") action, the harm has a differential impact on shareholders, whether the difference arises amongst members of different classes of shareholders or as between members of a single class. It has also been said that in a derivative action, the injury to shareholders is only indirect; that is, it arises only because the corporation is injured, and not otherwise.

Access to derivative actions and the oppression remedy is available to any complainant, which in the case of the CBCA includes current and former shareholders, current and former directors and officers, the Director, and "any other person who, in the discretion of a court, is a proper person to make an application under this Part." In that regard, it can include a creditor of the corporation, but not every creditor will qualify. The court has discretion to dismiss an action where it is found to be frivolous, vexatious, or bound to be unsuccessful.

Shareholders can also bring claims based on breaches for personal rights directly, such as having one's right to vote obstructed.

=== Derivative actions ===
Derivative actions may be pursued by a complainant if:

1. fourteen days' notice is given to the directors,
2. the complainant is acting in good faith, and
3. it appears to be in the interests of the corporation or its subsidiary that the action be brought, prosecuted, defended or discontinued.

=== Oppression remedy ===
Canadian legislation provides for a broad approach to the oppression remedy. In Peoples Department Stores Inc. (Trustee of) v. Wise, the Supreme Court of Canada noted:

48. ... The oppression remedy of s. 241(2)(c) of the CBCA and the similar provisions of provincial legislation regarding corporations grant the broadest rights to creditors of any common law jurisdiction. One commentator describes the oppression remedy as "the broadest, most comprehensive and most open-ended shareholder remedy in the common law world."

In BCE Inc. v. 1976 Debentureholders, the Supreme Court of Canada stated that, in assessing a claim of oppression, a court must answer two questions:

- Does the evidence support the reasonable expectation asserted by the claimant? and
- Does the evidence establish that the reasonable expectation was violated by conduct falling within the terms "oppression", "unfair prejudice" or "unfair disregard" of a relevant interest?

Where conflicting interests arise, it falls to the directors of the corporation to resolve them in accordance with their fiduciary duty to act in the best interests of the corporation. There are no absolute rules and no principle that one set of interests should prevail over another. This is defined as a "tripartite fiduciary duty", composed of (1) an overarching duty to the corporation, which contains two component duties — (2) a duty to protect shareholder interests from harm, and (3) a procedural duty of "fair treatment" for relevant stakeholder interests. This tripartite structure encapsulates the duty of directors to act in the "best interests of the corporation, viewed as a good corporate citizen". Following BCE, the Court of Appeal of British Columbia noted that "breach of fiduciary duty ... 'may assist in characterizing particular conduct as tending as well to be 'oppressive', 'unfair', or 'prejudicial'". More recently, scholarly literature has clarified the connection between the oppression remedy and the fiduciary duty in Canadian law:

84. Upholding the reasonable expectations of corporate constituents is the cornerstone of the oppression remedy. Establishing a breach of the tripartite fiduciary duty has the effect of raising a presumption of conduct contrary to the reasonable expectations of a complainant.

Under the business judgment rule, deference should be accorded to the business decisions of directors acting in good faith in performing the functions they were elected to perform, but such deference is not absolute.

The remedy can extend to a wide variety of scenarios:

- It can be potentially used by any stakeholder to deal with any type of unfair conduct by a corporation
- It can cover an affiliate not incorporated under the same Act
- It has been used to enforce unpaid judgments against the corporation's directors, where the corporation had been subject to asset stripping
- It has also been used in conjunction with other remedies — including the threatened winding up of a company by the court — in order to resolve shareholder disputes in closely held companies.
- The Crown has employed the oppression remedy in its status as a creditor under the Income Tax Act, in order to set aside dividend payments that rendered a corporation unable to pay its tax liability.
- Where a company has made excessive salary payments to a controlling shareholder, a judgment creditor has been permitted to be a complainant.
- A wrongfully dismissed employee can make a claim in order to thwart a corporation from conducting asset stripping in order to make itself judgment proof.

The court's discretion is not unlimited, as the Court of Appeal of Newfoundland and Labrador observed in 2003:

- The result of the exercise of the discretion contained in subsection 371(3) must be the rectification of the oppressive conduct. If it has some other result the remedy would be one which is not authorized by law.
- Any rectification of a matter complained of can only be made with respect to the person's interest as a shareholder, creditor, director or officer.
- Persons who are shareholders, officers and directors of companies may have other personal interests which are intimately connected to a transaction. However, it is only their interests as shareholder, officer or director as such which are protected by section 371 of the Act. The provisions of that section cannot be used to protect or to advance directly or indirectly their other personal interests.
- The law is clear that when determining whether there has been oppression of a minority shareholder, the court must determine what the reasonable expectations of that person were according to the arrangements which existed between the principals.
- They must be expectations which could be said to have been, or ought to have been, considered as part of the compact of the shareholders.
- The determination of reasonable expectations will also[...] have an important bearing upon the decision as to what is a just remedy in a particular case.
- The remedy must not be unjust to the others involved.

== Takeover bids ==
In takeover situations, Canada gives shareholders no straightforward right to extinguish a frustrating measure. However, ordinary directors' duties regarding conflicts of interest apply.

Rules governing takeover bids come from various sources:

- provisions in the incorporating statutes,
- rules found in the provincial and territorial securities laws (where the corporation's shares are publicly traded), and
- special requirements of the listing exchange (either the Toronto Stock Exchange or the TSX Venture Exchange).

Relatively little litigation has taken place in this matter in the Canadian courts. The current régime (which has been described as being quite lax in comparison to that in the United States) came into effect in 2008. The Canadian Securities Administrators issued proposals in 2013 on tightening early warning requirements in their rules, while in Quebec the Autorité des marchés financiers issued a proposal favouring an alternative approach concerning all take-over bid defensive tactics.

== Corporate reorganizations ==
Canadian corporate law offers a variety of options in which to conduct reorganizations, depending on whether the context concerns mergers and acquisitions or insolvency.

=== Companies' Creditors Arrangement Act ===
A unique feature of Canadian law is found in the Companies' Creditors Arrangement Act, which provides a scheme for allowing insolvent corporations, which owe in excess of $5 million to their creditors, a method for restructuring their business and financial affairs.

Under the CCAA, the court has broad discretion in administering any issues that may arise. As the Act says,

...the court, on the application of any person interested in the matter, may ... make any order that it considers appropriate in the circumstances.

This has allowed for very creative applications for resolving difficult scenarios, including:

- the packaging and orderly resolution of holdings of asset-backed commercial paper by multiple investors, which can include the release of claims against third parties who are themselves solvent and not creditors of the debtor company
- dealing with limited partnerships managed by an insolvent general partner
- arranging for disposal of the company through a stalking horse offer
- providing a more effective way for arranging merger and acquisition transactions involving distressed companies
- administering the liquidation of the company
- declining to approve restructuring plans, either because they are poorly conceived or contrary to the best interests of the parties concerned

=== Plans of arrangement ===
The various Canadian statutes also allow for plans of arrangement to be devised for companies that are solvent. In that regard, the CBCA defines arrangements as including:

- an amendment to the articles of a corporation;
- an amalgamation of two or more corporations;
- an amalgamation of a body corporate with a corporation that results in an amalgamated corporation subject to this Act;
- a division of the business carried on by a corporation;
- a transfer of all or substantially all the property of a corporation to another body corporate in exchange for property, money or securities of the body corporate;
- an exchange of securities of a corporation for property, money or other securities of the corporation or property, money or securities of another body corporate;
- a going-private transaction or a squeeze-out transaction in relation to a corporation;
- a liquidation and dissolution of a corporation; and
- any combination of the foregoing.

Plans of arrangement have been employed in cross-border mergers to great success. They have also been used for debt restructuring in insolvency situations, which is a recent innovation in Canadian proceedings.

The Supreme Court of Canada, in its ruling in BCE Inc. v. 1976 Debentureholders, stated that, in seeking court approval of an arrangement, the onus is on the corporation to establish that

- the statutory procedures have been met;
- the application has been put forth in good faith; and
- the arrangement is "fair and reasonable".

To approve a plan of arrangement as fair and reasonable, courts must be satisfied that

- the arrangement has a valid business purpose, and
- the objections of those whose legal rights are being arranged are being resolved in a fair and balanced way.

Courts should refrain from substituting their views of the "best" arrangement, but should not surrender their duty to scrutinize the arrangement. Only security holders whose legal rights stand to be affected by the proposal are envisioned. It is a fact that the corporation is permitted to alter individual rights that places the matter beyond the power of the directors and creates the need for shareholder and court approval. However, in some circumstances, interests that are not strictly legal could be considered. The fact that a group whose legal rights are left intact faces a reduction in the trading value of its securities generally does not constitute a circumstance where non‑legal interests should be considered on an application for an arrangement.

The courts take their duty seriously in assessing such plans, as was evidenced in Ontario in 2014. In determining that a plan of arrangement was fair, no weight was given by the court to the fairness opinion obtained by the directors, as:

- shareholders considering the fairness opinion did not have disclosure of the fees payable to the advisor to assess how much work was performed, and
- it did not include any of the underlying financial analysis performed by the advisor, so
- it could not be considered to comply with procedural requirements for expert evidence.

However, such concern may not apply where a transaction is not being contested, in which case the opinion may considered as evidence that the board had "considered the fairness and reasonableness of the proposed transaction on the basis of objective criteria to the extent possible."

=== Liquidation and dissolution ===
Liquidation (also known as winding up) can occur in several ways:

- under provisions of the incorporating statute, where the corporation is solvent,
- under the Bankruptcy and Insolvency Act, where it is insolvent or has committed an act of bankruptcy, or
- under the Winding-Up and Restructuring Act, where it is an insolvent financial institution or an insolvent corporation incorporated under provincial law (although the latter case is only rarely seen in recent times).

Liquidation under the incorporating statute can occur with or without an accompanying court order that provides for the orderly payment of debts and/or the dissolution of the corporation. Under the BIA, an insolvent corporation exits bankruptcy after the court approves its discharge (but it may not apply for discharge until its debts are paid in full). Under the WURA the corporation is required to cease business.

Dissolution is a separate process, which may occur:

- with or without liquidation (although liquidation under court order will extinguish all debts), or
- where it is not in compliance with the incorporating statute.

== See also ==
- UK company law
- US corporate law
- Australian corporations law
- German company law
- French company law
- European company law
- List of acts of the Parliament of Canada
- Unlimited liability corporation
- List of company registers

Jurisdiction	For-profit corporations	Not-for-profit corporations	Registry or agent	Corporate tax rates (Standard/Small business)
Canada (Federal incorporation)	Canada Business Corporations Act (R.S.C., 1985, c. C-44)	Canada Not-for-profit Corporations Act (S.C. 2009, c. 23)	Corporations Canada	15%/11%
British Columbia	Business Corporations Act (SBC 2002, c. 57)	Societies Act (SBC 2015, c. 18	BC Registry Services - Corporate Registry	10%/2.5%
Alberta	Business Corporations Act (RSA 2000, c. B-9)	Companies Act (RSA 2000, c. C-21)	Service Alberta - Corporate Registry	10%/3%
Saskatchewan	Business Corporations Act (RSS 1978, c. B-10)	Non-profit Corporations Act, 1995 (SS 1995, c. N-4.2)	Saskatchewan Corporate Registry	12%/2%
Manitoba	Corporations Act, (CCSM, c. C225)		Entrepreneurship Manitoba - Companies Office	12%/0%
Ontario	Business Corporations Act (RSO 1990, c. B.16)	Corporations Act, 2010 (RSO 1990, c. C.38)	ServiceOntario - Companies and Personal Property Security Branch	11.5%/4.5%
Quebec	Business Corporations Act (c S-31.1)	Companies Act (CQLR c C-38)	Registraire des Entreprises	11.9%/3.9%
New Brunswick	Business Corporations Act (S.N.B. 1981, c. B-9.1)	Companies Act (R.S.N.B. 1973, c. C-13)	Service New Brunswick - Corporate Registry	12%/4.5%
Nova Scotia	Companies Act (RSNS 1989, c. 81)	Societies Act (RSNS 1989, c. 435)	Access Nova Scotia - Registry of Joint Stock Companies	16%/3.5%
Prince Edward Island	Companies Act (RSPEI 1988, c. C-14)		Department of Environment, Labour and Justice	16%/1%
Newfoundland and Labrador	Corporations Act (RSNL 1990, c. C-36)		Service NL - Registry of Companies	14%/4%
Yukon	Business Corporations Act (RSY 2002, c. 20)	Societies Act (RSY 2002, c. 206)	Department of Community Services - Corporate Affairs	15%/4%
Northwest Territories	Business Corporations Act (SWNT 1996, c. 19)	Societies Act (RSNWT 1988, c. S-11)	Department of Justice - Corporate Registry	11.5%/4%
Nunavut	Business Corporations Act (SWNT 1996, c. 19, as modified)	Societies Act (RSNWT 1988, c. S-11, as modified)	Department of Justice - Corporate Registries	12%/4%
