= Oppression remedy in Canadian corporate law =

The oppression remedy in Canadian corporate law is a powerful tool available in Canadian courts, unique in breadth and scope compared to other examples of the oppression remedy found elsewhere in the world.

== Origin ==
Provisions similar to s. 210 of the UK Companies Act 1948 were first introduced into Canadian law through the 1975 passage of the Canada Business Corporations Act. It incorporated recommendations made in 1962 by the UK Jenkins Committee on Company Law for removing the linkage of the remedy with that of winding-up and for broadening its scope. Most provinces later adopted similar provisions.

== Scope ==
Canadian legislation (both federally and in all provinces) (Note: Prince Edward Island was the last jurisdiction to introduce the remedy when its corporate law reform came into effect on May 3, 2019, subject to a three-year transitional period for present PEI companies to apply for continuance under the new Act) provides for a broad approach to the oppression remedy (French: recours en oppression). In Peoples Department Stores Inc. (Trustee of) v. Wise, the Supreme Court of Canada noted:

48. ...The oppression remedy of s. 241(2)(c) of the CBCA and the similar provisions of provincial legislation regarding corporations grant the broadest rights to creditors of any common law jurisdiction. One commentator describes the oppression remedy as “the broadest, most comprehensive and most open-ended shareholder remedy in the common law world.”

In the CBCA, s. 241 states:

241. (1) A complainant may apply to a court for an order under this section.

(2) If, on an application under subsection (1), the court is satisfied that in respect of a corporation or any of its affiliates

(a) any act or omission of the corporation or any of its affiliates effects a result,
(b) the business or affairs of the corporation or any of its affiliates are or have been carried on or conducted in a manner, or
(c) the powers of the directors of the corporation or any of its affiliates are or have been exercised in a manner

that is oppressive or unfairly prejudicial to or that unfairly disregards the interests of any security holder, creditor, director or officer, the court may make an order to rectify the matters complained of.

(3) In connection with an application under this section, the court may make any interim or final order it thinks fit including, without limiting the generality of the foregoing,

(a) an order restraining the conduct complained of;
(b) an order appointing a receiver or receiver-manager;
(c) an order to regulate a corporation’s affairs by amending the articles or by-laws or creating or amending a unanimous shareholder agreement;
(d) an order directing an issue or exchange of securities;
(e) an order appointing directors in place of or in addition to all or any of the directors then in office;
(f) an order directing a corporation, subject to subsection (6), or any other person, to purchase securities of a security holder;
(g) an order directing a corporation, subject to subsection (6), or any other person, to pay a security holder any part of the monies that the security holder paid for securities;
(h) an order varying or setting aside a transaction or contract to which a corporation is a party and compensating the corporation or any other party to the transaction or contract;
(i) an order requiring a corporation, within a time specified by the court, to produce to the court or an interested person financial statements in the form required by section 155 or an accounting in such other form as the court may determine;
(j) an order compensating an aggrieved person;
(k) an order directing rectification of the registers or other records of a corporation under section 243;
(l) an order liquidating and dissolving the corporation;
(m) an order directing an investigation under Part XIX to be made; and
(n) an order requiring the trial of any issue.

A "complainant" is deemed to be a current or former registered security holder, a current or former director or officer, the Director appointed under the CBCA, or "any other person who, in the discretion of a court, is a proper person to make an application under this Part." In that regard, it can include a creditor of the corporation (but not every creditor will qualify), as well as a trustee appointed under the Bankruptcy and Insolvency Act or (in some circumstances) a monitor appointed under the Companies' Creditors Arrangement Act.

As in the United Kingdom, oppressive conduct is not restricted to that committed by corporations. In the case of corporate directors, the Supreme Court of Canada in 2017 held that they can be held personally liable for such conduct, but only where:

1. the oppression remedy request is a fair way of dealing with the situation;
2. any order made under s. 241(3) should go no further than necessary to rectify the oppression; and
3. any such order may serve only to vindicate the reasonable expectations of security holders, creditors, directors or officers in their capacity as corporate stakeholders; but
4. director liability cannot be a surrogate for other forms of statutory or common law relief, particularly where such other relief may be more fitting in the circumstances.

== Jurisprudence ==
In BCE Inc v 1976 Debentureholders, the Supreme Court of Canada stated that, in assessing a claim of oppression, a court must answer two questions:

- Does the evidence support the reasonable expectation asserted by the claimant? and
- Does the evidence establish that the reasonable expectation was violated by conduct falling within the terms “oppression”, “unfair prejudice” or “unfair disregard” of a relevant interest?

Where conflicting interests arise, it falls to the directors of the corporation to resolve them in accordance with their fiduciary duty. This is defined as a "tripartite fiduciary duty", composed of (1) an overarching duty to the corporation, which contains two component duties — (2) a duty to protect shareholder interests from harm, and (3) a procedural duty of "fair treatment" for relevant stakeholder interests. This tripartite structure encapsulates the duty of directors to act in the "best interests of the corporation, viewed as a good corporate citizen". Following BCE, the Court of Appeal of British Columbia noted that "breach of fiduciary duty ... 'may assist in characterizing particular conduct as tending as well to be 'oppressive', 'unfair', or 'prejudicial'". More recently, scholarly literature has clarified the connection between the oppression remedy and the fiduciary duty in Canadian law:

Upholding the reasonable expectations of corporate constituents is the cornerstone of the oppression remedy. Establishing a breach of the tripartite fiduciary duty has the effect of raising a presumption of conduct contrary to the reasonable expectations of a complainant.

Under the business judgment rule, deference should be accorded to the business decisions of directors acting in good faith in performing the functions they were elected to perform.

== Extent of application ==
Applications to the Court have been successful where:

1. there was lack of a valid corporate purpose for the transaction;
2. the corporation and its controlling shareholders failed to take reasonable steps to simulate an arm's length transaction;
3. there was lack of good faith on the part of the corporation's directors;
4. there was discrimination among shareholders which benefited the majority to the exclusion of the minority;
5. there was a lack of adequate and appropriate disclosure of material information to minority shareholders; and
6. there was a plan to eliminate a minority shareholder.

The types of behaviour that such actions encompass have included the diversion of corporate profits, the personal use of such profits by a controlling shareholder, the exclusion of the applicant from the corporation's operations, and changing the proportionate holdings by different shareholders.

The remedy can extend to a wide variety of scenarios:

- It can be potentially used by any stakeholder to deal with any type of unfair conduct by a corporation
- It can cover an affiliate not incorporated under the same Act
- It has been used to enforce unpaid judgments against the corporation's directors, where the corporation had been subject to asset stripping
- It has also been used in conjunction with other remedies — including the threatened winding up of a company by the court — in order to resolve shareholder disputes in closely held companies.
- The Crown has employed the oppression remedy in its status as a creditor under the Income Tax Act, in order to set aside dividend payments that rendered a corporation unable to pay its tax liability.
- Where a company has made excessive salary payments to a controlling shareholder, a judgment creditor has been permitted to be a complainant.
- A wrongfully dismissed employee can make a claim in order to thwart a corporation from conducting asset stripping in order to make itself judgment proof. The remedy has also been extended to scenarios where such a dismissal has been followed by directors ceasing operations and migrating to a phoenix company.
- Where representations have been made by officers of a parent corporation to an officer of a subsidiary about the terms of a stock option plan, such representations may create a reasonable expectation and give rise to an oppression remedy complaint if they are subsequently breached.
- Where a controlling shareholder engaged in asset stripping in breach of his fiduciary duty to the corporation, an order was made for his removal as a director and officer, the mandatory redemption of the shares he controlled and of a shareholder loan due to him, and his removal as a trustee from a trust controlling other shares in the corporation.

The court's discretion is not unlimited, as the Court of Appeal of Newfoundland and Labrador observed in 2003:

- The result of the exercise of the discretion contained in subsection 371(3) must be the rectification of the oppressive conduct. If it has some other result the remedy would be one which is not authorized by law.
- Any rectification of a matter complained of can only be made with respect to the person’s interest as a shareholder, creditor, director or officer.
- Persons who are shareholders, officers and directors of companies may have other personal interests which are intimately connected to a transaction. However, it is only their interests as shareholder, officer or director as such which are protected by section 371 of the Act. The provisions of that section cannot be used to protect or to advance directly or indirectly their other personal interests.
- The law is clear that when determining whether there has been oppression of a minority shareholder, the court must determine what the reasonable expectations of that person were according to the arrangements which existed between the principals.
- They must be expectations which could be said to have been, or ought to have been, considered as part of the compact of the shareholders.
- The determination of reasonable expectations will also[...] have an important bearing upon the decision as to what is a just remedy in a particular case.
- The remedy must not be unjust to the others involved.

== Comparison with derivative actions ==
Oppression claims are separate from derivative actions, but the two are not mutually exclusive. However, a derivative action claim can only be instituted by leave of the court, as it is brought by a complainant to sue on behalf of the corporation for a wrong done to the corporation, and any successful claim is binding on all shareholders. This is in contrast to the oppression remedy claim, where a complainant sues on behalf of himself for a wrong he suffers personally as a result of corporate conduct.

In 2015, the Ontario Court of Appeal dismissed an oppression remedy claim, because the claimant was only seeking recovery of funds for the benefit of the corporation. As a result of the discussion within the judgment, the following general principles can be drawn for determining which remedy is more appropriate:

1. To claim oppression, a plaintiff must plead that they suffered personal harm distinct from that suffered by the corporation itself.
2. The focus of the oppression remedy is on the effects of the impugned conduct on the complainant, not on the corporation.
3. If the relief sought is for the benefit of the corporation, then the action will most likely have to be brought as a derivative action, and leave will be required.
4. The causes of action overlap where the corporation is small and closely held, and where the impugned conduct directly affects the complainant in a way that differs from the effects on other shareholders. In such cases, a claim may be brought either as a derivative action or a claim for oppression.
