= Insolvency law of Canada =

The Parliament of Canada has exclusive jurisdiction to regulate matters relating to bankruptcy and insolvency, by virtue of Section 91(2) of the Constitution Act, 1867. It has passed the following statutes as a result:

- The Bankruptcy and Insolvency Act ("BIA")
- The Companies' Creditors Arrangement Act ("CCAA")
- The Farm Debt Mediation Act
- The Wage Earner Protection Program Act
- The Winding-Up and Restructuring Act (which essentially applies only to financial institutions under federal jurisdiction)

In applying these statutes, provincial law has important consequences. Section 67(1)(b) of the BIA provides that "any property that as against the bankrupt is exempt from execution or seizure under any laws applicable in the province within which the property is situated and within which the bankrupt resides".

Provincial legislation under the property and civil rights power of the Constitution Act, 1867 regulates the resolution of financial difficulties that occur before the onset of insolvency. Notable legislation is in effect for governing:

- creation of security interests (with notable caveats)
- absconding debtors
- bulk sales (in Ontario only)
- fraudulent conveyances
- relief of creditors
- seizure of assets
- assignments and preferences

== Administration of insolvency law ==
The Office of the Superintendent of Bankruptcy is charged with the administration of the BIA and the CCAA. All records relating to matters under those Acts are accessible at their website. The Office also licenses insolvency trustees (LITs), who are authorized to:

- administer estates of bankrupts
- handle consumer and commercial proposals in order to forestall an assignment in bankruptcy
- act as a monitor under the CCAA
- act as a receiver under Part XI of the BIA, to take possession and administer property as a consequence of provisions in a security agreement or by virtue of any federal or provincial law that authorizes the appointment of a receiver or receiver-manager

== See also ==
- Commercial insolvency in Canada
- Consumer bankruptcy in Canada
- Bankruptcy and Insolvency Act
