= Commercial insolvency in Canada =

Business insolvency in Canada

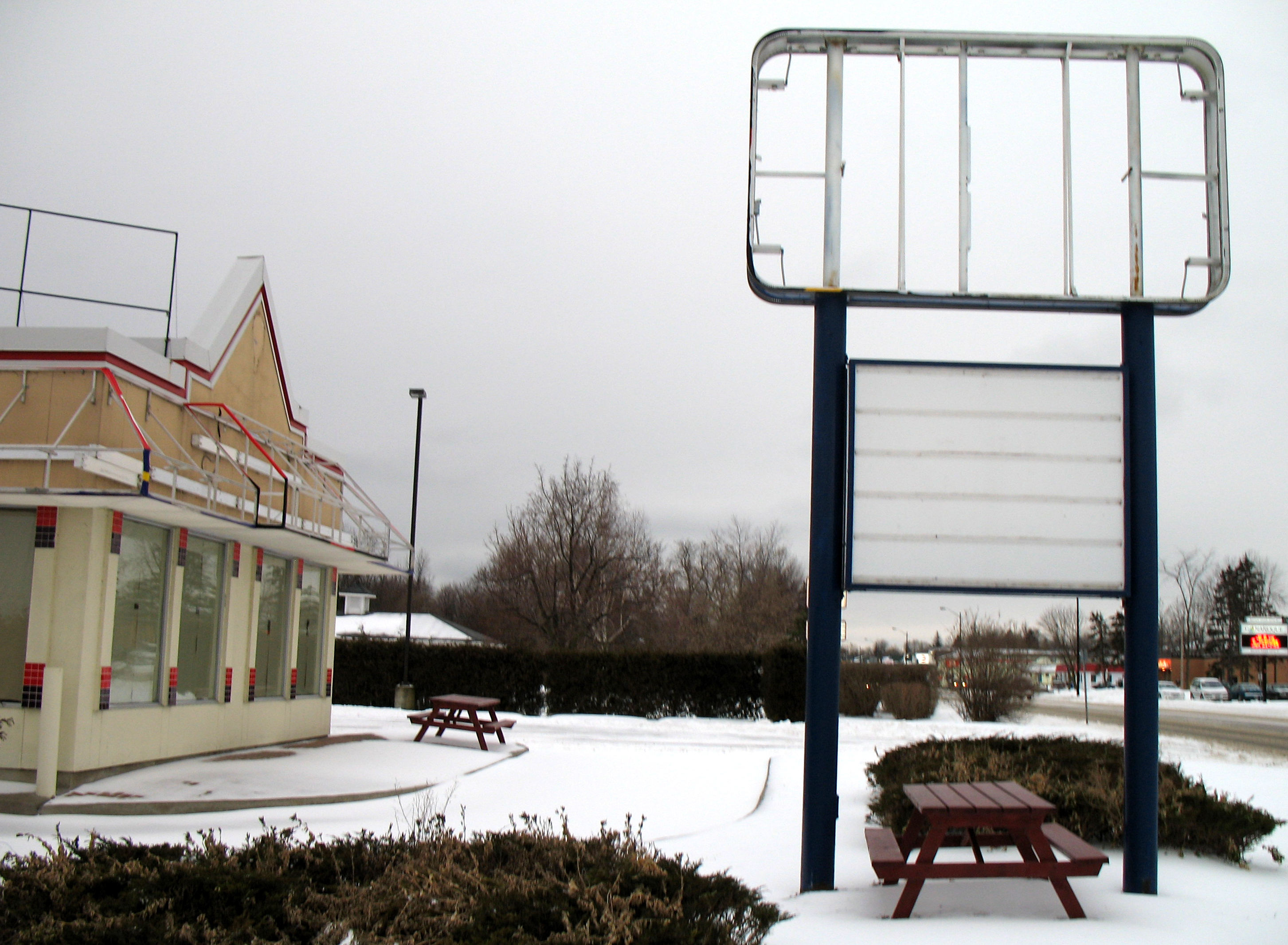
A closed restaurant in Gananoque, Ontario

Commercial insolvency in Canada has options and procedures that are distinct from those available in consumer insolvency proceedings. It is governed by the following statutes:

- The Bankruptcy and Insolvency Act ("BIA")
- The Companies' Creditors Arrangement Act ("CCAA")
- The Winding-Up and Restructuring Act

The following discussion concentrates on insolvency as it applies to corporations, but the rules apply to individuals and other entities involved in commercial matters as well, with necessary modifications.

== Financial difficulties prior to insolvency ==
Provincial legislation under the property and civil rights power of the Constitution Act, 1867 regulates the resolution of financial difficulties that occur before the onset of insolvency, and the BIA incorporates many of them by reference in the application of its provisions. Notable legislation is in effect for governing:

- absconding debtors
- fraudulent conveyances
- relief of creditors
- seizure of assets

As well, corporate directors have a statutory duty of loyalty to the corporation and a duty of care to all of its stakeholders. It follows that directors have a duty to ensure that their corporation carries on business only if it can meet its liabilities as they become due and if there is a reasonable expectation of newly incurred obligations being satisfied.

== Alternatives to resolving financial difficulties ==
Where a commercial debtor is experiencing financial difficulties, it is generally in his best interests to work with the secured lenders. The following options may be considered in order to seek a resolution to the matter:

- informal compromise with creditors
- out-of court restructuring agreements
- plans of arrangement under the Canada Business Corporations Act or similar provincial corporations legislation
- the debtor making an assignment for the general benefit of creditors under the pertinent provincial legislation
- the creditor(s) securing appointment of a receiver or interim receiver to seize and administer any of the debtor's property
- the debtor making a proposal to creditors (known as a "Division I proposal")
- the debtor making an application under the CCAA to make a compromise or arrangement with its creditors
- an insolvent debtor making an assignment under the BIA for the general benefit of his creditors
- creditors applying for a bankruptcy order where the debtor owes at least $1,000 and has committed an act of bankruptcy

All options other than the first four have the effect of staying any proceedings that can be brought against the debtor.

Insolvent persons have the choice of making an assignment immediately, or to seek protection from creditors in order to reorganize their affairs and continue as a going concern. For the latter option, companies owing less than $5 million generally opt to file a Division I proposal, while those owing more can also opt for the CCAA proceeding.

== Entities subject to insolvency regime ==
With certain exceptions, the BIA covers a wide range of entities:

- it covers anyone who has resided or carried on business in Canada
- it "includes a partnership, an unincorporated association, a corporation, a cooperative society or a cooperative organization, the successors of a partnership, of an association, of a corporation, of a society or of an organization and the heirs, executors, liquidators of the succession, administrators or other legal representatives of a person;" but
- it does not apply to banks, insurance companies, trust companies, or loan companies.
- Insolvent financial institutions are governed by the Winding-Up and Restructuring Act.
- partners in a partnership may be placed into bankruptcy with that partnership, but that can only occur where the partnership is located in one of the common-law jurisdictions; the Civil Code of Quebec defines partnership property as being a patrimony independent from its partners
- The Farm Debt Mediation Act provides that farmers cannot be forced into bankruptcy, but they can make a voluntary assignment.

The CCAA covers insolvent companies (together with their affiliates) with debts greater than $5 million.

The Winding-Up and Restructuring Act, in addition to its application to financial institutions, also offers a little-used alternative to the BIA for certain groups of insolvent companies.

== Settlement of the insolvent person's estate ==
The trustee/receiver/monitor must first realize the amount of the proceeds from the property that is available for payment to the different classes of creditors, and different rules apply according to the type of proceeding. They are summarized as follows:

Starting with the property under the possession or control of the insolvent person
Type	Notice of intention, or proposal	Bankruptcy	Receivership	CCAA
Held in trust for another person	Exclude	Exclude	Exclude	
Exempt from execution or seizure	Exclude	Exclude	Exclude	
Income tax refunds for the fiscal year of the event	Add	Add	Add	
Such powers over property as are exercised for the insolvent person's own benefit	Add	Add	Add	
Garnishments for enforcing notices of assessment for income tax, CPP and EI liability	Exclude	Exclude	Exclude	
Withholding taxes deducted at source	Exclude	Exclude	Exclude	
Funds constituting a deemed trust for the Crown (other than for garnishments and withholding taxes deducted at source)			Exclude	
Third party's property in possession of bankrupt		Exclude		
Goods shipped in 30 days prior to the event, and still unpaid	Exclude	Exclude	Exclude	
Produce of farmer, fisherman or aquaculturist shipped in 15 days prior to the event, and still unpaid	Exclude	Exclude	Exclude	
Copyrights and manuscripts for works not yet published		Revert to owner		
Property transferred at undervalue	Add	Add	Add	Add

The estate is then settled, using the priority of claims outlined in the BIA.

== Creation of security interests ==
It is in the lender's or supplier's best interest to minimize his financial exposure should his client experience financial difficulties. To that end, there is a range of remedies available to establish his status as a secured (vs unsecured) creditor under both provincial and federal legislation.

In the common law provinces, security interests are created through the registration of mortgages and charges against the real property concerned. In Quebec, this is done by way of hypothecs against immoveable property.

For personal property (moveable property in Quebec), secured creditors create their security interests through registration under the Personal Property Security Act ("PPSA") in force in their province, or under the Civil Code in Quebec by way of hypothec through the Registre des droits personnels et réels mobiliers. Banks can also create security interests under SS. 426-427 of the Bank Act, which normally have priority over PPSA registrations. However, as noted by the Supreme Court of Canada in Bank of Montreal v. Innovation Credit Union, with regard to unperfected security interests, this depends on the provisions of the PPSA in effect in the province concerned.

There can be complex interplay between insolvency law and other legal regimes, such as admiralty law.

In the common law provinces and territories, legislation in place for specific security interests is as follows:

Province	Personal Property Security Act	Securities Transfer Act	Builders' liens	Repair and storage liens	Workers' liens
British Columbia	RSBC 1996, c. 359	SBC 2007, c. 10	Builders Lien Act	Repairers Lien Act, Warehouse Lien Act	Livestock Lien Act, Tugboat Worker Lien Act, Woodworker Lien Act
Alberta	RSA 2000, c. P‑7	SA 2006, c. S-4.5	Builders' Lien Act	Possessory Liens Act, Warehousemen's Lien Act, Garage Keepers' Lien Act	Woodmen's Lien Act
Saskatchewan	SS 1993, c. P-6.2	SS 2007, c. S-42.3	Builders' Lien Act	Commercial Liens Act	Threshers' Lien Act, Woodmen's Lien Act
Manitoba	CCSM c. P35	SM 2008, c. 14, also referred to as CCSM c. S60	Builders' Liens Act	Garage Keepers Act, Warehousemen's Liens Act	Threshers' Liens Act, Woodmen's Liens Act
Ontario	RSO 1990, c. P.10	SO 2006, c. 8	Construction Lien Act	Repair and Storage Lien Act	Forestry Workers Lien for Wages Act
New Brunswick	SNB 1993, c. P-7.1	SNB 2008, c. S-5.8		Liens on Goods and Chattels Act, Mechanics' Lien Act, Storer's Lien Act	Woods Workers' Lien Act
Nova Scotia	SNS 1995-96, c. 13	SNS 2010, c. 8	Builders' Lien Act		Woodmen's Lien Act
Prince Edward Island	SPEI 1997, c.33, also referred to as c. P-3.1			Garage Keepers' Lien Act, Mechanics' Lien Act, Warehousemen's Lien Act	
Newfoundland and Labrador	SNL 1998, c. P-7.1	SNL 2007, c. S-13.01		Mechanics' Lien Act, Warehouser's Lien Act	
Yukon	RSY 2002, c. 169	SY 2010, c. 16	Builders Lien Act	Garage Keepers Lien Act, Warehouse Keepers Lien Act	Miners Lien Act
Northwest Territories	SNWT 1998, c.8	SNWT 2009, c.14		Garage Keepers Lien Act, Mechanics Lien Act, Warehouse Keepers Lien Act	Miners Lien Act
Nunavut	As NWT	SNu 2010, c. 15		As for NWT	As for NWT

== Debtor protection provisions ==
=== Stay of proceedings ===
No person may terminate or amend — or claim an accelerated payment or forfeiture of the term under — any agreement, including a security agreement, with a bankrupt individual by reason only of the individual's bankruptcy or insolvency. Similar provision is made with respect to any insolvent person upon filing a notice of intention or a proposal, as well as for any debtor company subject to the CCAA by reason only that proceedings commenced under the CCA or that the company is insolvent. Because of these restrictions on what are called "ipso facto" clauses, creditors must be careful in specifying appropriate trigger events in their contracts' termination clauses. The Canadian courts have extended this further through application of the common law principle of fraud upon the bankruptcy law, declaring that termination clauses that are triggered where non-payment of obligations is indirectly caused by the debtor's insolvency should be deemed to have been caused by the insolvency.

A notice of intention or a Division I proposal will automatically create a stay of proceedings and "no creditor has any remedy against the debtor or the debtor's property, or shall commence or continue any action, execution or other proceedings, for the recovery of a claim provable in bankruptcy". Similar provision is also made on the bankruptcy of any debtor. Directors of insolvent companies that have filed a notice of intention or a proposal have similar protection.

=== Suspension of attachments ===
S. 70(1) of the BIA provides that bankruptcy orders and assignments take precedence over "all judicial or other attachments, garnishments, certificates having the effect of judgments, judgments, certificates of judgment, legal hypothecs of judgment creditors, executions or other process against the property of a bankrupt," but that does not extend to:

- those that have been completely executed by payment to the creditor or the creditor's representative, or
- the rights of a secured creditor.

The Ontario Court of Appeal has ruled that, in the case of a "requirement to pay" under the Income Tax Act (Canada) that was issued after a notice of application to appoint a receiver (but before the court heard the application), supported by an ex parte "jeopardy order" issued by the Federal Court of Canada under s. 225.1(1) of that Act, the "requirement to pay" was considered to have been completely executed on the date of its issue, and thus took precedence over other creditors' claims.

=== Contractual arrangements ===
Contracts may be assigned elsewhere in the event of a notice of intention of a Division I proposal, bankruptcy or CCAA proceeding. Agreements of any kind can be disclaimed in the event of a Division I proposal or CCAA proceeding, as well as leases in a bankruptcy proceeding.

Critical suppliers may be ordered to continue dealing with companies undergoing a CCAA proceeding, if the goods or services supplied are critical to the company's continued operation.

== Anti-avoidance provisions ==
=== Attacking questionable behaviour ===
As in other countries, certain debtors may be tempted to bypass the process outlined above through the transfer of assets from an insolvent company to a phoenix company, thus abandoning outstanding liabilities to creditors. Recent legal developments have made this procedure unattractive, through creditors using the oppression remedy available under the CBCA and similar provincial corporations legislation.

Several procedures are available for investigating companies' behaviour during times of insolvency or other financial difficulty. The BIA provides for examination of relevant parties during the administration of the estate, and the CBCA and similar provincial corporations legislation provides for the court to appoint inspectors to investigate and report back on fraudulent, dishonest, oppressive or unfairly prejudicial behaviour of a corporation. A typical inspector's report can be viewed here.

The court has power to remove one or more of the company's directors, if the court is satisfied that the director is unreasonably impairing or is likely to unreasonably impair the possibility of a viable proposal (or in the case of the CCAA, a compromise or arrangement) being made in respect of the company or is acting or is likely to act inappropriately as a director in the circumstances.

=== Protection of creditors ===
Where bankruptcy is sought, it does not necessarily wipe the slate clean on certain debts. Some liabilities are not released upon discharge. Directors and parties related to the bankrupt may still be held personally liable for certain tax debts, (Note: Whether through non-arm's-length transfers of property at less than fair market value when the debt is outstanding or distribution of property from the estate without a clearance certificate.)and directors can be held accountable for other liabilities.

Certain bankruptcy and CCAA proceedings involve the issue of unpaid wages, severance and termination pay, and other payroll liabilities. The Wage Earner Protection Program Act provides a procedure to claim a portion of the amount due, against which the "super-priority" of the employees on the assets of the estate is subrogated.

== See also ==
- Bankruptcy and Insolvency Act
- Companies' Creditors Arrangement Act
- Insolvency law of Canada
