= Bulk transfer =

Bulk transfer may refer to:

- Bulk sale, an ownership transfer of inventory to another company
- Bulk transport, the transportation of bulk cargo
