= BCE Inc v 1976 Debentureholders =

- Supreme Court of Canada

Hearing: June 17, 2008 Judgment: June 20, 2008
- Citations: 2008 SCC 69; [2008] 3 SCR 560; 301 DLR (4th) 80; 52 BLR (4th) 1; 71 CPR (4th) 303
- Docket No.: 32647
- Prior history: APPEALS and CROSS‑APPEALS from judgments of the Quebec Court of Appeal (Robert C.J.Q. and Otis, Nuss, Pelletier and Dalphond JJ.A.), 2008 QCCA 934 (CanLII), setting aside decisions by Silcoff J., 2008 QCCS 907 (CanLII)
- Ruling: Appeals allowed and cross‑appeals dismissed.

Holding
- Under the CBCA, the s. 241 oppression action and the s. 192 requirement for court approval of a change to the corporate structure are different types of proceedings, engaging different inquiries.

Court membership
- Chief Justice: Beverley McLachlin; Puisne Justices: Michel Bastarache, Ian Binnie, Louis LeBel, Marie Deschamps, Morris Fish, Rosalie Abella, Louise Charron, Marshall Rothstein

Reasons given
- Unanimous reasons by: The Court
- Bastarache J. took no part in the consideration or decision of the case.

Laws applied
- Canada Business Corporations Act

BCE Inc v 1976 Debentureholders, 2008 SCC 69 (CanLII), [2008] 3 SCR 560 is a leading decision of the Supreme Court of Canada on the nature of the duties of corporate directors to act in the best interests of the corporation, "viewed as a good corporate citizen". This case introduced the principle of fair treatment as an organizing principle in Canadian corporate law.

== Facts ==
BCE Inc. was the subject of multiple offers involving a leveraged buyout, for which an auction process was held and offers were submitted by three groups. All three offers contemplated the addition of a substantial amount of new debt for which Bell Canada, a whollyowned subsidiary of BCE, would be liable. One of the offers, which involved a consortium of three investors, was determined by BCE's directors to be in the best interests of BCE and BCE's shareholders. That was to be implemented by a plan of arrangement under s. 192 of the Canada Business Corporations Act, which was approved by 97.93% of BCE's shareholders but opposed by a group of financial and other institutions that held debentures issued by Bell Canada and sought relief under the oppression remedy under s. 241 of the CBCA. They also alleged that the arrangement was not "fair and reasonable" and opposed s. 192 approval by the court. Their main complaint was that, upon the completion of the arrangement, the short‑term trading value of the debentures would decline by an average of 20 percent and could lose investment grade status.

== Judgment ==
=== Superior Court of Quebec ===
Silcoff J. of the Superior Court of Quebec approved the arrangement as fair and dismissed the claim for oppression.

On appeal, the Quebec Court of Appeal held:

- the arrangement had not been shown to be fair and held that it should not have been approved,
- the directors had not only the duty to ensure that the debentureholders' contractual rights would be respected, but also to consider their reasonable expectations, and
- since the requirements of s. 192 of the CBCA were not met, the court found it unnecessary to consider the oppression claim.

BCE and Bell Canada appealed the overturning of the trial judge's approval of the plan of arrangement, and the debentureholders cross‑appealed the dismissal of the claims for oppression.

=== Supreme Court ===
In a unanimous decision, the SCC ruled that the appeals should be allowed and the cross‑appeals dismissed. In summary, it held that the s. 241 oppression action and the s. 192 requirement for court approval of a change to the corporate structure are different types of proceedings, engaging different inquiries. The Court of Appeal's decision rested on an approach that erroneously combined the substance of the s. 241 oppression remedy with the onus of the s. 192 arrangement approval process, resulting in a conclusion that could not have been sustained under either provision, read on its own terms.

Remedies under the CBCA

The SCC reviewed the various remedies available to shareholders that have developed under the common law, and that have subsequently been expanded upon in the CBCA:

- a derivative action under s. 239
- a civil action against the directors for breach of duty of care
- an oppression action under s. 241
- contesting a plan of arrangement under s. 192

In the present case, only ss. 192 and 241 were being raised.

Nature of the oppression remedy

In assessing a claim of oppression, a court must answer two questions:

- Does the evidence support the reasonable expectation asserted by the claimant? and
- Does the evidence establish that the reasonable expectation was violated by conduct falling within the terms "oppression", "unfair prejudice" or "unfair disregard" of a relevant interest?

Where conflicting interests arise, it falls to the directors of the corporation to resolve them in accordance with their fiduciary duty to act in the best interests of the corporation, "viewed as a good corporate citizen".

Approval process for a plan of arrangement

In seeking court approval of an arrangement, the onus is on the corporation to establish that

- the statutory procedures have been met;
- the application has been put forth in good faith; and
- the arrangement is "fair and reasonable".

To approve a plan of arrangement as fair and reasonable, courts must be satisfied that

(a) the arrangement has a valid business purpose, and
(b) the objections of those whose legal rights are being arranged are being resolved in a fair and balanced way.

Courts on a s. 192 application should refrain from substituting their views of the "best" arrangement, but should not surrender their duty to scrutinize the arrangement. Under s. 192, only security holders whose legal rights stand to be affected by the proposal are envisioned. It is a fact that the corporation is permitted to alter individual rights that places the matter beyond the power of the directors and creates the need for shareholder and court approval. However, in some circumstances, interests that are not strictly legal could be considered. The fact that a group whose legal rights are left intact faces a reduction in the trading value of its securities generally does not, without more, constitute a circumstance where non‑legal interests should be considered on a s. 192 application.

In this case, the debentureholders did not constitute an affected class under s. 192, and the trial judge was correct in concluding that they should not be permitted to veto almost 98 percent of the shareholders simply because the trading value of their securities would be affected. It was clear to the judge that the continuance of the corporation required acceptance of an arrangement that would entail increased debt and debt guarantees by Bell Canada. No superior arrangement had been put forward and BCE had been assisted throughout by expert legal and financial advisors. Recognizing that there is no such thing as a perfect arrangement, the trial judge correctly concluded that the arrangement had been shown to be fair and reasonable.

== Significance ==
The judgment expanded on the SCC's previous ruling in Peoples Department Stores Inc. (Trustee of) v. Wise concerning the latitude of discretion accorded to corporate directors, providing they follow certain procedural steps. There has been discussion as to whether these two judgments provide a coherent or complete summary of the law in that area.

There has also been extensive debate about the Court's obiter comment on the duties of directors:

[66] The fact that the conduct of the directors is often at the centre of oppression actions might seem to suggest that directors are under a direct duty to individual shareholders who may be affected by a corporate decision. Directors, acting in the best interests of the corporation, may be obliged to consider the impact of their decisions on corporate stakeholders, such as the debentureholders in these appeals. This is what we mean when we speak of a director being required to act in the best interests of the corporation viewed as a good corporate citizen. However, the directors owe a fiduciary duty to the corporation, and only to the corporation. People sometimes speak in terms of directors owing a duty to both the corporation and to stakeholders. Usually this is harmless, since the reasonable expectations of the stakeholder in a particular outcome often coincide with what is in the best interests of the corporation. However, cases (such as these appeals) may arise where these interests do not coincide. In such cases, it is important to be clear that the directors owe their duty to the corporation, not to stakeholders, and that the reasonable expectation of stakeholders is simply that the directors act in the best interests of the corporation.

In addition, BCE Inc. effectively mandates the use of fairness hearings by courts in consideration of plans of arrangements, as was notably practiced during the litigation that took place on the 2010 share buyout by Magna International.

=== The principle of fair treatment ===
Canadian corporate law contains an organizing principle of fair treatment within the Supreme Court's notion that directors are to act in the business interests of the corporation, "viewed as a good corporate citizen". A connection exists between corporate law's principle of fair treatment and contract law's principle of good faith established in Bhasin v. Hrynew – the Court's concern for standards of conduct that are both ethical and commercially reasonable. The much higher fiduciary duty has strong conceptual differences from the principle of good faith, yet shares this common underlying policy governing corporate and commercial relationships.

Rojas, 2014 (p. 67 at note 38), quoting the Supreme Court of Canada in BCE:

This case does involve the fiduciary duty of the directors to the corporation, and particularly the fair treatment component of this duty, which ... is fundamental to the reasonable expectations of stakeholders claiming an

oppression remedy" (para 36) ... [t]he corporation and shareholders are entitled to maximize profit and share value, to be sure, but not by treating individual stakeholders unfairly. Fair treatment – the central theme running through the oppression jurisprudence – is most fundamentally what stakeholders are entitled to 'reasonably expect' (para 64) ... it may be readily inferred that a stakeholder has a reasonable expectation of fair treatment (para 70) (emphasis added).

=== Relationship with the fiduciary duty ===
Where conflicting interests arise, it falls to the directors of the corporation to resolve them in accordance with their fiduciary duty. This is defined as a "tripartite fiduciary duty", composed of:

1. an overarching duty to the corporation, which contains
2. a duty to protect shareholder interests from harm, and
3. a procedural duty of "fair treatment" for relevant stakeholder interests.

This tripartite structure encapsulates the duty of directors to act in the "best interests of the corporation, viewed as a good corporate citizen". Following BCE, the Court of Appeal of British Columbia noted that "breach of fiduciary duty ... 'may assist in characterizing particular conduct as tending as well to be 'oppressive', 'unfair', or 'prejudicial'". More recently, scholarly literature has clarified the connection between the oppression remedy and the fiduciary duty:

Upholding the reasonable expectations of corporate constituents is the cornerstone of the oppression remedy. Establishing a breach of the tripartite fiduciary duty has the effect of raising a presumption of conduct contrary to the reasonable expectations of a complainant.
