= Shareholder oppression =

Shareholder oppression occurs when the majority shareholders in a corporation take action that unfairly prejudices the minority. It most commonly occurs in non-publicly traded companies, because the lack of a public market for shares leaves minority shareholders particularly vulnerable, since minority shareholders cannot escape mistreatment by selling their stock and exiting the corporation. The majority shareholders may harm the economic interests of the minority by refusing to declare dividends or attempting a squeezeout. The majority may physically lock the minority out of the corporate premises and even deny the minority the right to inspect corporate records and books, making it necessary for the minority to sue every time it wants to look at them. An important concept in law pertaining to shareholder oppression is the "reasonable expectations" of the minority shareholder. The "fair dealing" standard is also sometimes used by courts.

The potential for shareholder oppression arguably increased when corporate law was changed to eliminate the common law right of minority shareholders to veto fundamental corporate changes such as mergers. It has been said that the business judgment rule and notions of majority rule have allowed shareholder majorities to use the minority's investment without paying for it. It has also been said, however, that it is difficult to determine how to deal with the rights of the minority shareholder without destroying the corporation, while still respecting the rights of the majority shareholder.

The courts sometimes make oppression remedies available. An oppressed minority shareholder can ask the court to dissolve the corporation or hold the corporation's leaders accountable for their fiduciary responsibilities. Another remedy sometimes used is the court-ordered purchase of shares. As of 1997, the European Union still had not harmonized laws for dealing with shareholder oppression. In the United Kingdom, the Companies Act 2006 governs remedies for minority shareholder oppression. In Australia, section 232 of the Corporations Act sets out the grounds for the making of an order. Contractual protections, such as buyout provisions in a shareholder agreement, have been cited as a potential alternative to statutory protections for minority shareholders. Occasionally, the oppressive conduct may even justify the involuntary dissolution of the corporation in order to protect the minority shareholders.
