= Unlimited liability corporation =

Canadian corporation designation

An unlimited liability corporation (ULC) within Canadian corporate law is a Canadian corporation designation, wherein shareholders are liable up to unlimited amounts for any liability, act or default of the corporation. By comparison, in most corporations, shareholders are not usually liable due to a limited liability model. ULCs can be used by American corporations for tax planning, as ULCs are treated as corporations for Canadian tax purposes but as flow-through entities for American tax purposes.

By 1997, unlimited liability corporations had been abolished in Canadian corporate law in all Canadian jurisdictions except for the province of Nova Scotia, where ULCs remain available. However, due to their increased use in American companies' tax planning since then, ULCs were permitted in Alberta and British Columbia starting in the mid-2000s.

== Usefulness in foreign direct investments by US corporations ==
ULCs have commonly been used by US companies investing in Canada on a greenfield basis or through corporate acquisitions of Canadian entities or assets, especially if those Canadian assets or operations are expected to generate business losses. This became especially significant after the 1997 introduction of the entity classification rules in the US Internal Revenue Code which provided that:

[(b)(8)(ii)(A)] The following entities will not be treated as corporations under paragraph (b)(8)(i) of this section: (1) With regard to Canada, a Nova Scotia Unlimited Liability Company (or any other company or corporation all of whose owners have unlimited liability pursuant to federal or provincial law)....

In essence, the ULC can act as a “flow-through” or “disregarded” entity for US tax purposes as the US tax rules “look through” the ULC to its shareholder(s). In contrast, the ULC is treated as a corporation, and is subject to tax at the corporate level, for Canadian tax purposes.

Nova Scotia had been the last of the Canadian jurisdictions to allow the incorporation of such corporations at that time. Since then, Alberta allowed such formations in 2005, followed by British Columbia in 2007, to take advantage of this niche provided by US tax law.

=== Changes to Canada–US tax treaty, 2010 ===
Effective January 1, 2010, the Canada–US tax treaty—formally, the Canada–United States Convention with Respect to Taxes on Income and on Capital, signed September 26, 1980—was amended by inserting a new Article IV(7):

7. An amount of income, profit or gain shall be considered not to be paid to or derived by a person who is a resident of a Contracting State where:

(a) The person is considered under the taxation law of the other Contracting State to have derived the amount through an entity that is not a resident of the first-mentioned State, but by reason of the entity not being treated as fiscally transparent under the laws of that State, the treatment of the amount under the taxation law of that State is not the same as its treatment would be if that amount had been derived directly by that person; or

(b) The person is considered under the taxation law of the other Contracting State to have received the amount from an entity that is a resident of that other State, but by reason of the entity being treated as fiscally transparent under the laws of the first-mentioned State, the treatment of the amount under the taxation law of that State is not the same as its treatment would be if that entity were not treated as fiscally transparent under the laws of that State.

As a ULC is generally considered for US tax purposes to be considered "fiscally transparent" under this provision, this will mean that payments (such as interest, royalties and dividends) from a Canadian ULC to its US parent will be subject to a 25% withholding tax under Part XIII of the Income Tax Act (Canada). However, technical guidance issued by the Canada Revenue Agency has indicated that certain strategies are available to mitigate the impact of such changes.

== Applicable law by jurisdiction ==
Relevant rules relating to ULCs
Description	Alberta	British Columbia	Nova Scotia
Framework	Based very closely on modern US corporations statutes		Closely modelled on the United Kingdom Companies Acts
Location of head office	In the province	In the province	In the province
Nature of liability	Unlimited for obligations arising from actions and proceedings commenced by or against the ULC before its dissolution or within 2 years thereafter.	Unlimited for obligations arising from actions and proceedings commenced by or against the ULC before its dissolution or within 1 year thereafter.	Shareholders are liable for all debts and liabilities upon winding up. This liability is unlimited for past or present shareholders (but for past shareholders it is extinguished one year after he ceases to be a shareholder).
Residency requirements for directors	¼ of all directors must be Canadian residents	None	None
Directors' duty of care	Statutorily bound to exercise “the care, diligence and skill that a reasonably prudent person would exercise in comparable circumstances”	As for Alberta	Determined under the common law
Power to manage corporation	Directors can manage “or supervise the management” of the business and affairs of the corporation (with authority to delegate that power to shareholders through a USA corporation or LLC)	Directors must manage or supervise the management of the business and affairs of the company	Shareholders have power to manage the corporation (and the authority to delegate that power to directors)
Amalgamation of corporations	Both short-form (parent and subsidiary amalgamation with only board approval required), and long-form (2/3 shareholder approval) are available	Foreign corporations may not amalgamate with BC ULCs	No Court approval is required if all shareholders approve the amalgamation
Reductions in stated capital	2/3 shareholder approval is needed	By court order or special resolution	2/3 shareholder approval is required
Declaration of dividends	The board may declare dividends if it has reasonable grounds to believe that a corporate solvency test is satisfied	As for Alberta	Dividends must be declared and paid out of the profits of the company
Purchase of own shares	A corporation may hold shares in itself and allow subsidiaries to hold its shares for a maximum of 30 days (without cancellation)	Purchased shares must be cancelled, but none may be purchased if it may make the corporation insolvent. Subsidiaries are allowed to purchase its parent's shares.	Other than redeemable shares, any acquisition by a corporation of its own shares must have requisite shareholder approval
Continuance		Only Alberta and Nova Scotia ULCs, and other corporations prescribed by regulation, may migrate to BC, and a foreign ULC may not migrate into BC as a limited liability corporation	Foreign corporations can continue into Nova Scotia as a ULC, with approval of all shareholders. Nova Scotia ULCs can export to foreign jurisdictions upon 2/3 shareholder approval.
Conversion between limited and unlimited liability status	No restrictions	No restrictions	No restrictions (but subject to shareholder approval)

== See also ==
- List of acts of the Parliament of Canada
