= Licensed Insolvency Trustee =

Occupation
- Occupation type: Professional
- Activity sectors: Insolvency, Bankruptcy, Restructuring

Description
- Education required: Undergraduate degree

A Licensed Insolvency Trustee (LIT; French: Syndic autorisé en insolvabilité; SAI) is a private-sector professional that is federally regulated and authorized by the Superintendent of Bankruptcy to manage insolvency proceedings in accordance with the Canadian Bankruptcy and Insolvency Act. Licensed insolvency Trustees are generally members of the Canadian Association of Insolvency and Restructuring Professionals (CAIRP).

It has been established by various jurisdictional courts that Licensed Insolvency Trustees are officers of the court. As a result, they have the obligation to impartially represent the interests of all creditors of the bankrupt and to act equitably between the competing interests of the different types of creditors.

== Professional designation ==
To preserve the integrity of the insolvency system and reduce confusion in the marketplace, the Superintendent of Bankruptcy adopted by directive the professional designation "Licensed Insolvency Trustee" (French: "Syndic autorisé en insolvabilité") in April 2016. Although the designation does not appear in the Bankruptcy and Insolvency Act or the Companies' Creditors Arrangement Act, it applies to individuals licensed under that regime and distinguishes them from other service providers assisting debtors. Only those holding the designation are listed on the Superintendent's public Registry of Licensed Insolvency Trustees, and the designation is protected as an official mark of a public authority under the Trademarks Act.

Under the Superintendent of Bankruptcy's Directive No. 33, Trustee Designation and Advertising, trustees are required to identify themselves using the professional designation "Licensed Insolvency Trustee" or the acronym "LIT" in all communications and representations relating to activities carried out in their capacity as licensed trustees under the Bankruptcy and Insolvency Act. Additionally, any person who uses the designation "Licensed Insolvency Trustee (LIT)" without being duly licensed may commit an offence under the Bankruptcy and Insolvency Act, punishable on summary conviction by a fine, imprisonment, or both.

== Types of insolvency trustee licences ==
=== i. Individual trustee licences ===
Prior to the 1992 reforms to the Bankruptcy and Insolvency Act, only individuals could be licensed as insolvency trustees under the legislation. Applicants were required to meet prescribed qualifications relating to knowledge, experience, financial standing, and professional reputation, and to satisfy examination requirements. Once licensed, individual trustees were authorized to administer insolvency proceedings in their own name and were subject to regulatory oversight by the Superintendent. It was through the enactment of the 1992 Bankruptcy and Insolvency Act that corporate Licensed Insolvency Trustee structures were first formally recognized.

=== ii. Corporate trustee licences ===
Corporate insolvency trustee licences were introduced with the 1992 reforms to the Bankruptcy and Insolvency Act, which formally recognized the ability of firms to operate as Licensed Insolvency Trustees. Under this framework, corporate licences are granted subject to prescribed conditions, including requirements relating to ownership, control, and professional supervision. In particular, a licensed corporation must act through designated individual trustee(s), who remain responsible for the administration of insolvency proceedings and for compliance with the statutory and regulatory regime. Behind every corporate Licensed Insolvency Trustee there must be at least one individual Licensed Insolvency Trustee.

== Standards of professional conduct ==
=== i. Standards imposed by federal legislation and regulations ===
According to section 13.5 of the Bankruptcy and Insolvency Act, Licensed insolvency trustees are required to comply with the Code of Ethics for trustees set out in Rule 34 to 53 of the Bankruptcy and Insolvency General Rules The Code of Ethics for trustees establishes service and advertising standards, states the information that trustees are required to provide to creditors and contains rules relating to the treatment of funds in trust and to the sale or purchase of a bankrupt's property.

Standards Imposed by the Code of Ethics for Trustees
Reference	Standards / Rules
Section 34 of the Code of Ethics for Trustees	Maintain high ethical standards central to public trust in the insolvency system.
Section 35 of the Code of Ethics for Trustees	Defines "professional engagement" for the Code.
Section 36 of the Code of Ethics for Trustees	Perform duties competently and timely; act with honesty, integrity, and due care.
Section 37 of the Code of Ethics for Trustees	Provide accurate information required by the Superintendent (regulator).
Section 38 of the Code of Ethics for Trustees	Do not assist dishonest, fraudulent, criminal, or illegal conduct.
Section 39 of the Code of Ethics for Trustees	Be honest and impartial; provide full and accurate information as required by the Act.
Section 40 of the Code of Ethics for Trustees	Keep confidential information confidential except where disclosure is required/permitted.
Section 41 of the Code of Ethics for Trustees	Do not use confidential information for personal/third-party benefit.
Section 42 of the Code of Ethics for Trustees	Do not purchase debtor/estate property (with narrow "public offering/normal business" exceptions).
Section 43 of the Code of Ethics for Trustees	Restricts sales of debtor/estate property to insiders/other trustees except under controlled conditions.
Section 44 of the Code of Ethics for Trustees	Avoid influences/interests/relationships that impair or appear to impair professional judgment.
Section 45 of the Code of Ethics for Trustees	Do not sign false/misleading documents; do not use disclaimers to evade responsibility.
Section 46 of the Code of Ethics for Trustees	If transmitting unverified info, it must be clearly identified as unverified and not misleading.
Section 47 of the Code of Ethics for Trustees	Do not engage in business/occupation that compromises ability, integrity, independence, or competence.
Section 48 of the Code of Ethics for Trustees	Hold entrustments (money/property) in trust according to law; administer with due care.
Section 49 of the Code of Ethics for Trustees	No referral fees/kickbacks: do not pay to obtain engagements or accept value for referrals.
Section 50 of the Code of Ethics for Trustees	Do not solicit/accept engagements that would discredit the profession or insolvency system integrity.
Section 51 of the Code of Ethics for Trustees	Advertising must not be false/misleading/incomplete; must not unfairly attack other trustees/process integrity.
Section 52 of the Code of Ethics for Trustees	Ensure employees/agents/contractors are supervised and meet the same ethical standards.
Section 53 of the Code of Ethics for Trustees	Complaints about Code contraventions must be sent in writing to the Superintendent's division office.

=== ii. Standards imposed by the CAIRP ===
Licensed insolvency trustees are also expected to comply with the Standards of Professional Practice and the Rules of Professional Conduct issued by the Canadian Association of Insolvency And Restructuring Professionals (CAIRP). Designed to promote uniformity within the profession, these standards must be interpreted consistently with the Bankruptcy and Insolvency Act, the Bankruptcy and Insolvency General Rules, the Code of Ethics for trustees, the Superintendent of Bankruptcy's directives and all other applicable regulations.
