= Oppression remedy =

Concept in corporate law

In corporate law in Commonwealth countries, an oppression remedy is a statutory right available to oppressed shareholders. It empowers the shareholders to bring an action against the corporation in which they own shares when the conduct of the company has an effect that is oppressive, unfairly prejudicial, or unfairly disregards the interests of a shareholder. It was introduced in response to Foss v Harbottle, which had held that where a company's actions were ratified by a majority of the shareholders, the courts will not generally interfere.

It has been widely copied in companies legislation throughout the Commonwealth, including:

- the Canada Business Corporations Act, and
- the Corporations Act 2001 of Australia
- the Companies Act 1993 of New Zealand
- the Companies Act, 2008 of South Africa
- the Companies Act of Singapore
- the Companies Act 1965 of Malaysia

The Companies Ordinance of Hong Kong also contains similar provisions.

== Introduction in the United Kingdom ==
An oppression remedy, intended to operate as an alternative to winding up a company, was adopted as s. 210 of the Companies Act 1948, which declared:

210. (1) Any member of a company who complains that the affairs of the company are being conducted in a manner oppressive to some part of the members (including himself) or, in a case falling within [s. 169(3)], the Board of Trade, may make an application to the court by petition for an order under this section.

(2) If on any such petition the court is of opinion—

(a) that the company's affairs are being conducted as aforesaid; and
(b) that to wind up the company would unfairly prejudice that part of the members, but otherwise the facts would justify the making of a winding-up order on the ground that it was just and equitable that the company should be wound up;

the court may, with a view to bringing to an end the matters complained of, make such order as it thinks fit, whether for regulating the conduct of the company's affairs in future, or for the purchase of the shares of any members of the company by other members of the company or by the company and, in the case of a purchase by the company, for the reduction accordingly of the company's capital, or otherwise.

In the Companies Act 2006, the relevant provision is expressed in s. 994 (and the Secretary of State has similar authority under s. 995):

994. (1) A member of a company may apply to the court by petition for an order under this Part on the ground—

(a) that the company's affairs are being or have been conducted in a manner that is unfairly prejudicial to the interests of members generally or of some part of its members (including at least himself), or
(b) that an actual or proposed act or omission of the company (including an act or omission on its behalf) is or would be so prejudicial.

Conduct that is considered to constitute "unfair prejudice" has been given a broad interpretation, which can include:

- exclusion from management in circumstances where there is a legitimate expectation of participation;
- the diversion of business to another company in which the majority shareholder holds an interest;
- the awarding by the majority shareholder to himself of excessive financial benefits; and
- abuses of power and breaches of the Articles of Association.

The conduct is not confined to a specific group. In Re HR Harmer Ltd, Jenkins LJ noted that the definition is "wide enough to cover oppression by anyone who is taking part in the conduct of the affairs of the company whether de facto or de jure." Therefore, it can cover the actions of:

- directors,
- a controlling shareholder,
- persons with de facto control of the company,
- a class of shareholders, or
- conduct of a related company.

== Application in Canada ==
Provisions similar to s. 210 of the 1948 UK Act were first introduced into Canadian law through the 1975 passage of the Canada Business Corporations Act. It incorporated recommendations made in 1962 by the UK Jenkins Committee on Company Law for removing the linkage of the remedy with that of winding-up and for broadening its scope. Canadian legislation (both federally and in all provinces) provides for a broad approach to the oppression remedy (French: recours en oppression). In Peoples Department Stores Inc. (Trustee of) v. Wise, the Supreme Court of Canada noted:

48. ...The oppression remedy of s. 241(2)(c) of the CBCA and the similar provisions of provincial legislation regarding corporations grant the broadest rights to creditors of any common law jurisdiction. One commentator describes the oppression remedy as “the broadest, most comprehensive and most open-ended shareholder remedy in the common law world.”

A "complainant" is deemed to be a current or former registered security holder, a current or former director or officer, the Director appointed under the CBCA, or "any other person who, in the discretion of a court, is a proper person to make an application under this Part." In that regard, it can include a creditor of the corporation (but not every creditor will qualify), as well as a trustee appointed under the Bankruptcy and Insolvency Act or a monitor appointed under the Companies' Creditors Arrangement Act.

As in the United Kingdom, oppressive conduct is not restricted to that committed by corporations. In the case of corporate directors, the Supreme Court of Canada in 2017 held that they can be held personally liable for such conduct, but only where:

1. the oppression remedy request is a fair way of dealing with the situation;
2. any order made under s. 241(3) should go no further than necessary to rectify the oppression; and
3. any such order may serve only to vindicate the reasonable expectations of security holders, creditors, directors or officers in their capacity as corporate stakeholders; but
4. director liability cannot be a surrogate for other forms of statutory or common law relief, particularly where such other relief may be more fitting in the circumstances.

Applications to the Court have been successful where:

1. there was lack of a valid corporate purpose for the transaction;
2. the corporate and its controlling shareholders failed to take reasonable steps to simulate an arm's length transaction;
3. there was lack of good faith on the part of the corporation's directors;
4. there was discrimination among shareholders which benefited the majority to the exclusion of the minority;
5. there was a lack of adequate and appropriate disclosure of material information to minority shareholders; and
6. there was a plan to eliminate a minority shareholder.

The court's discretion is not unlimited, as the Court of Appeal of Newfoundland and Labrador observed in 2003:

- The result of the exercise of the discretion contained in subsection 371(3) must be the rectification of the oppressive conduct. If it has some other result the remedy would be one which is not authorized by law.
- Any rectification of a matter complained of can only be made with respect to the person’s interest as a shareholder, creditor, director or officer.
- Persons who are shareholders, officers and directors of companies may have other personal interests which are intimately connected to a transaction. However, it is only their interests as shareholder, officer or director as such which are protected by section 371 of the Act. The provisions of that section cannot be used to protect or to advance directly or indirectly their other personal interests.
- The law is clear that when determining whether there has been oppression of a minority shareholder, the court must determine what the reasonable expectations of that person were according to the arrangements which existed between the principals.
- They must be expectations which could be said to have been, or ought to have been, considered as part of the compact of the shareholders.
- The determination of reasonable expectations will also[...] have an important bearing upon the decision as to what is a just remedy in a particular case.
- The remedy must not be unjust to the others involved.

Oppression claims are separate from derivative actions, but the two are not mutually exclusive. However, a derivative action claim can only be instituted by leave of the court, as it is brought by a complainant to sue on behalf of the corporation for a wrong done to the corporation, and any successful claim is binding on all shareholders. This is in contrast to the oppression remedy claim, where a complainant sues on behalf of himself for a wrong he suffers personally as a result of corporate conduct.

== Application in Australia ==
S. 234 of the Corporations Act 2001 provides that the following can apply for an order seeking relief for oppressive conduct:

- a member of the company, on behalf of himself or another member,
- a person who has been removed from the register of members, or has ceased to be a member under circumstances which are the substance of the application,
- a person to whom a share in the company has been transmitted by will or by operation of law, or
- any other person, with the consent of the Australian Securities and Investments Commission, in connection to a current or prior investigation into the company conducted by ASIC.

S. 232 states that the conduct of the company's affairs, an actual or proposed act or omission by or on behalf of a company, or a resolution or proposed resolution by all, or by a class, of the shareholders, must be:

- contrary to the interests of the shareholders as a whole; or
- oppressive to, unfairly prejudicial to, or unfairly discriminatory against, a shareholder or shareholders whether in that capacity or in any other capacity,

in order for an application to be considered.

The oppression remedy, together with the option available for winding up a company and ASIC's use of the public interest ground in that regard, has received greater exposure and legal development since the 2008 financial crisis.
