= Winding-up and Restructuring Act =

Parliament of Canada
- Citation: R.S.C., 1985, c. W-11
- Enacted by: Parliament of Canada
- Enacted: 1985
- Status: In force

The Winding-up and Restructuring Act (French: Loi sur les liquidations et les restructurations, WURA) is a statute of the Parliament of Canada that provides for the winding up of certain corporations and the restructuring of financial institutions. It was passed in 1985, and has been amended since. Predecessors of the act date back to 1882.

== History ==
Following the 1880 repeal of Canadian insolvency law at the federal level, the Parliament of Canada returned to the field in 1882, passing legislation "for the purpose of winding-up insolvent banks, and insolvent trading companies," known as An Act respecting Insolvent Banks, Insurance Companies, Loan Companies, Building Societies and Trading Corporations. Until the passage of the Bankruptcy Act in 1919, it was the only federal statute governing insolvency, and it only extended to corporations. The 1919 Act covered individuals and corporations, so corporations were given a choice as to how to proceed with the liquidation of their affairs.

In 1899, provision was made for compromises and arrangements to be made during winding-up proceedings, subject to the approval by the creditors and the court. (Note: one commentator has suggested that the provision has been largely unused since that date)

In 1966, bankruptcy proceedings were given precedence over winding-up proceedings, and any of the latter instituted prior to a bankruptcy petition or assignment coming into effect had to be abated forthwith.

In 1996, the Act was retitled as the Winding-up and Restructuring Act, and provision was made for the restructuring of insurance companies.

== Application ==
| The Act applies to: | excepting for: | where any of those bodies are: |
|---|---|---|
| all corporations incorporated under federal jurisdiction, banks and savings banks, authorized foreign banks, trust companies, insurance companies, certain loan companies, building societies with share capital, and; incorporated trading companies doing business in Canada wherever incorporated, | building societies without share capital, railway or telegraph companies, or; corporations incorporated under the Canada Business Corporations Act the Canada Cooperatives Act, or the Canada Not-for-Profit Corporations Act | insolvent, in liquidation or in the process of being wound up, and any interested party petitions to be brought under the act, or; a financial institution, which is under the control, or its assets are under the control, of the Superintendent and is the subject of an application for a winding-up order, |

A company is deemed insolvent when:

- it is unable to pay its debts as they become due (and a debt over $200, for which a demand in writing to pay the amount is not settled within 60 days, is deemed to be so),
- it calls a meeting of its creditors for the purpose of compounding with them,
- it exhibits a statement showing its inability to meet its liabilities,
- it has otherwise acknowledged its insolvency,
- it disposes (or attempts or is about to dispose) of any of its property, in order to defraud or avoid any or all of its creditors,
- it has procured the seizure of any of its assets through any process of execution,
- it has made any general conveyance or assignment of its property for the benefit of its creditors, or, where it cannot pay its debts in full, it conveys any of its assets without the consent of its creditors or without satisfying their claims,
- the Canada Deposit Insurance Corporation, in its capacity as a receiver,

- is unable to arrange a transfer of a financial institution's business to a bridge institution
- is unable to arrange a restructuring plan for such a financial institution
- is only able to transfer part of a financial institution's business to a bridge institution

=== Exceptions ===
The Act cannot be used when proceedings have already been instituted under the Bankruptcy and Insolvency Act, but it is the only route for insolvent financial institutions to take, as they are not covered by the BIA.

It also offers a little-used route for corporations (other than those governed by the CBCA, CCoopA or CNPCA) to seek liquidation or winding-up that does not necessarily call for being insolvent (except for provincially incorporated companies, where the insolvency requirement is mandatory). Companies for which there is no provision for winding-up either within their native statutes or under applicable provincial legislation comprise those incorporated under:

- Special Acts of Parliament
- Special Acts of the Legislative Assembly of Alberta
- the Canada Corporations Act
- the Defence Production Act
- the Pension Fund Societies Act

== Operation ==
=== Nature relative to the Bankruptcy and Insolvency Act ===
The WURA contains several provisions that stand in contrast to the BIA:

1. While the BIA provides that a creditor can only petition a debtor into bankruptcy only where the latter has committed an act of bankruptcy, the WURA provides that a debtor who fails to settle a demand served by a creditor within 60 days is deemed to have committed an act of insolvency and can thus be petitioned immediately into a winding-up proceeding. This is in contrast to any other act of insolvency established under the Act.
2. Crown immunity is not abolished with respect to its proceedings, and by extension Crown claims cannot be compromised in a restructuring.
3. Provisions relating to the avoidance of preferential transactions and contracts do not contain limitation periods, and payments made within thirty days of the commencement of proceedings are automatically presumed to be capable of being set aside.
4. There are only two classes of preferred claims, being the costs of administration and certain wages and salaries due to employees.
5. Inspectors may be appointed by the court in WURA proceedings, although their powers are undefined.

=== Nature of liquidator ===
In Coopérants, Mutual Life Insurance Society (Liquidator of) v Dubois, the Supreme Court of Canada held that a liquidator appointed under the Act was conceptually distinct from a trustee in bankruptcy appointed under the Bankruptcy and Insolvency Act:

Contrary to what occurs in the case of bankruptcy, the company continues to own its property, which is not transferred to the liquidator. Under s. 33 of the Winding‑up Act, the liquidator takes all the company's property, effects and choses in action "into his custody or under his control"... The liquidator is an officer of the court, appointed by the court to perform the functions prescribed by the Act and exercising his powers and performing his duties under the court's supervision. The corporate state and all the powers of the corporation continue after a winding‑up order is made; but from the time of such order the corporation is to cease to carry on business, except in so far as the liquidator considers it necessary for its beneficial winding up (s. 19). Even then, the liquidator must have the court's approval to do so under s. 35.

== See also ==
- Commercial insolvency in Canada
