= Wage Earner Protection Program Act =

Legislation of the Parliament of Canada

Parliament of Canada
- Long title: An Act to establish a program for making payments to individuals in respect of wages owed to them by employers who are bankrupt or subject to a receivership
- Citation: S.C. 2005, c. 47, s. 1
- Considered by: House of Commons of Canada
- Considered by: Senate of Canada
- Royal assent: 2005-11-25

Legislative history

First chamber: House of Commons of Canada
- First reading: June 3, 2005
- Second reading: October 5, 2005
- Third reading: November 21, 2005

Second chamber: Senate of Canada
- First reading: November 22, 2005
- Second reading: November 23, 2005
- Third reading: November 24, 2005
- Status: In force

The Wage Earner Protection Program Act (French: Loi sur le Programme de protection des salariés; S.C. 2005, c. 47, s.1), is an act of the Parliament of Canada. It was part of a package of reforms to the insolvency law of Canada that were brought into force in 2008 and 2009 to compensate employees of companies made bankrupt or placed into receivership under the Bankruptcy and Insolvency Act. It was subsequently expanded in 2011 to cover employees who lose their jobs when their employer's attempt at restructuring subsequently ends in bankruptcy or receivership.

== Background ==
The issue of fairness with respect to employees terminated as a result of business failures was addressed by the Parliament of Canada as early as 1949, when the Bankruptcy Act was amended to provide a limited preferred creditor status to such claims. From 1975, legislative proposals were actively considered for the establishment of a wage protection scheme in the event of the bankruptcy, liquidation or receivership of an employer. The various options discussed for how this could be achieved included:

- super priority for wage claims,
- recognition of existing provincial/territorial priorities within the BIA framework,
- a waiver of the waiting period for employment insurance benefits, and
- a wage earner protection fund financed either out of general tax revenues or as part of the employment insurance regime.

In November 2003, the Senate Committee on Banking, Trade and Commerce reviewed the history of these discussions and recommended that the option for super priority status be adopted. In 2005, the BIA was accordingly amended and the WEPPA enacted. These provisions did not immediately come into force, as several technical amendments needed to be passed in 2007. The act came into force on 7 July 2008.

== Wage Earner Protection Program framework ==
The WEPP is administered by Employment and Social Development Canada, drawing on reports submitted by trustees and receivers of employers undergoing restructuring, bankruptcy or receivership. Under the Program, payouts are made to eligible employees who earned eligible wages during a specified eligibility period, and such payments constitute (in part) a "super-priority" upon the employer's current assets.

- Eligible employees are those whose employer has declared bankruptcy or has been placed into receivership, except those who:

- were an officer or a director of the former employer
- had a controlling interest in the business of the former employer
- were a manager whose responsibilities included making binding financial decisions impacting the business of the former employer, and/or making binding decisions on the payment or non payment of wages by the former employer, or
- were not dealing at arm's length with any of these persons

- Eligible wages are:

- Salaries, commissions, compensation for services rendered, vacation pay, gratuities accounted for by the employer, disbursements of a travelling salesperson properly incurred in and about the business of the former employer, production bonuses and shift premiums that were earned during the eligibility period preceding the bankruptcy or receivership, and
- Severance pay and termination pay for employment that ended in the eligibility period preceding the bankruptcy or receivership.

- The eligibility period starts six months before a restructuring event and ends on the date of bankruptcy or receivership. If the employer did not go through restructuring, the eligibility period is the six-month period ending on the date of bankruptcy or receivership.
- The maximum amount that an eligible individual may receive is equal to four weeks of insurable Employment Insurance (EI) earnings. In 2016, the maximum equals $3,807.68.
- To the extent of the payments made, the WEPP is subrogated to any claims for wages an employee may have against:

- the bankrupt or insolvent employer, and
- where the employer is a corporation, any of its directors

== Controversy over scope and effect of WEPPA ==
As the act only covers wage claims that arise upon bankruptcy or receivership, it does not figure in proceedings conducted only under the Companies' Creditors Arrangement Act.

The phrase "compensation for services rendered" in the definition for "eligible wages" was held by the British Columbia Supreme Court in 2009 to include other amounts that were earned by the employee and which were directed to be paid to a third party pursuant to a contract covering the employee. This ruling was upheld in 2010 by the British Columbia Court of Appeal.

It has also been argued that the WEPPA may also have the counterintuitive effect of reducing manufacturing employment in Canada through automation and offshoring of processes, as well as restricting financing that could be available to manufacturers, because of the super-priority nature of the program.
