= Superintendent of Bankruptcy (Canada) =

- Surintendant des faillites
- Incumbent; Elisabeth Lang since October 7, 2018
- Government of Canada; Innovation, Science and Economic Development
- Type: Head of Agency
- Member of: Public Service of Canada
- Reports to: Minister of Industry
- Appointer: Governor in Council
- Constituting instrument: Bankruptcy and Insolvency Act
- Inaugural holder: W. J. Reilly
- Formation: December 1, 1932; 93 years ago
- Website: Office of the Superintendent of Bankruptcy webpage

The Superintendent of Bankruptcy is a Canadian government official who heads the Office of the Superintendent of Bankruptcy, a regulatory agency operating under the Ministry of Innovation, Science and Economic Development, and exercises independent statutory and quasi‑judicial powers. The Superintendent is responsible for supervising the administration of the Bankruptcy and Insolvency Act, as well as certain duties under the Companies' Creditors Arrangement Act, and ensuring that bankruptcies and insolvencies in Canada are conducted in a fair and orderly manner.

The position of Superintendent of Bankruptcy was established by the federal government with the enactment of the Bankruptcy Act Amendment Act, 1932, pursuant to its constitutional jurisdiction over bankruptcy and insolvency under section 91(21) of the Constitution Act, 1867.

== Appointment ==
The Superintendent of Bankruptcy is appointed by the Governor in Council for a term of not more than five (5) years. However, the Superintendent's term can be renewed by the Governor in Council following those five years. During his term, the Superintendent may also be removed from office for cause by the Governor in Council.

List of nominations since 1932
Nominations	Date of nomination	Term(s)
W. J. Reilly	September 14, 1932	1932-1946
E. H. Coleman	October 17, 1946	1946-1947
Robert Forsyth	April 3, 1947	1947-1949
Thomas D. Macdonald	March 8, 1949	1949-1950
A. J. MacLeod	March 25, 1950	1950-1954
A. H. M. Laidlaw	December 22, 1954	1954-1955
J. S. Larose	October 7, 1955	1955-1965
Roger Tassé	April 2, 1965	1965-1968
Raymond Landry	July 24, 1968	1968-1979
Jacques B. Brazeau	September 6, 1979	1979-1982
Yves Pigeon	November 28, 1982	1982-1985 (acting); 1985-1990
Walter Clare	August 4, 1990	1990-1991
George Frank Redling	June 23, 1992	1991-1992 (acting); 1992-1996
Marc Mayrand*	May 1, 1997	1996-1997 (acting); 1997-2002; 2002-2007
Alain Lafontaine	August 16, 2007	2007 (acting)
Patricia Alférez	2008	2008 (acting)
James Douglas Callon	March 12, 2008	2008-2011
William "Bill" James	March 19, 2013	2011-2013 (acting); 2013-2018
Elisabeth Lang	October 7, 2018	2018-2023; 2023-

*While he was serving as Superintendent of Bankruptcy, Marc Mayrand was nominated by Prime Minister Stephen Harper as the new Chief Electoral Officer of Canada on February 9, 2007. The appointment was approved by the House of Commons on February 21, 2007, and was affective as of the same date.

== Functions and powers ==
The Superintendent of Bankruptcy holds several functions and powers under Canada's Bankruptcy and Insolvency Act.

=== i. Appointing employees to assist the Superintendent ===
The Superintendent of Bankruptcy is permitted to appoint employees to assist her in performing her functions. The Office of the Superintendent of Bankruptcy employs approximately 370 employees across Canada.

The Superintendent is supported by legal counsel from the Department of Justice. In certain circumstances, however, external counsel may be retained, particularly to preserve both the appearance and reality of regulatory independence where the Crown is already involved in a proceeding as a creditor.

=== ii. Licensing of insolvency professionals ===
The Superintendent of Bankruptcy holds exclusive authority to issue insolvency trustee licences in Canada and may impose conditions on the granting of such licences.

The Superintendent receives and decides applications for trustee licences, sets licence conditions, and may refuse, suspend, cancel, reinstate or impose limitations, including security and training requirements, based on statutory criteria. Before exercising most discipline powers the Superintendent must give written notice and a reasonable opportunity for a hearing, and at such hearings may summon witnesses, require production of records, administer oaths, and issue written reasons that are reviewable in Federal Court. Many of these functions can be exercised by a delegate.

=== iii. Oversight, monitoring, and compliance ===
The Superintendent of Bankruptcy's primary role is to supervise the administration of all estates and matters to which the Bankruptcy and Insolvency Act applies. As such, the Bankruptcy and Insolvency Act contemplates that inquiries and investigations “may be made or caused to be made” by persons the Superintendent appoints, and that those appointees have access to relevant books and electronic data. These supervisory functions can be and regularly are carried out by OSB employees under the Superintendent’s authority. Additionally, the Superintendent may engage outside persons to conduct inquiries or investigations, may authorize representatives in writing to examine a trustee’s bank accounts, seek court leave to examine books and records (and, under warrant, search premises), and may obtain freeze orders over trustee or other designated accounts to protect estate funds.

If, after an investigation, there is evidence of an offence connected to a BIA matter, the Superintendent must report it to the provincial Attorney General or their designate and may recover investigation costs from recoveries. These investigative and reporting functions may be performed by authorized OSB staff “on behalf of” the Superintendent as the statute expressly permits.

To run the system consistently, the Superintendent of Bankruptcy may also intervene in court proceedings as if a party and may issue binding directives to official receivers, trustees, consumer-proposal administrators and counsellors regarding record-keeping, information reporting, prescribed forms, and the powers, duties and functions of these actors.

=== iv. Public records and registries ===
The Superintendent of Bankruptcy must keep, or cause to be kept, a public record of proposals, bankruptcies, trustee licences and the Superintendent’s appointments/designations of consumer-proposal administrators, along with receiver notices; on request and payment of the fee, information from that record is provided to the public, and the Superintendent may also agree to provide compiled datasets. This record-keeping obligation is fulfilled operationally by OSB personnel who run the national Bankruptcy and Insolvency Records system.
