= Bulk sale =

Business concept

A bulk sale, sometimes called a bulk transfer, is when a business sells all or nearly all of its inventory to a single buyer and such a sale is not part of the ordinary course of business. This type of action is often used in an attempt to dodge creditors who intend to seize such business's inventory; in order to protect the purchaser from claims made by creditors of the seller, the seller must usually complete an affidavit outlining its secured and unsecured creditors, which must usually be filed with a government department, such as a court office. Such procedures are outlined in the bulk sales act of most jurisdictions. If the buyer does not complete the registration process for a bulk sale, creditors of the seller may obtain a declaration that the sale was invalid against the creditors and the creditors may take possession of the goods or obtain judgment for any proceeds the buyer received from a subsequent sale.

== History ==
Bulk sales legislation came into place to prevent the fraudulent practice of selling the entire inventory of a farm or a store in order to defeat the claims of creditors who would otherwise be able to seize the goods to satisfy a debt. Under traditional fraudulent conveyance law, such a sale was not void against creditors unless it was made in bad faith for insufficient consideration. However, a bulk sale would generally allow a storekeeper to abscond with money while leaving creditors unpaid. However, because such a transaction was generally at arm's length, was for appropriate consideration, and may have been made in good faith, it was generally binding on creditors until bulk sales statutes were passed. Bulk sales legislation, such as Article Six of the Uniform Commercial Code was designed to eliminate this type of fraud.

For example, in the ordinary course of business, a car dealer would sell a number of cars in one day. In extraordinary circumstances, it might sell its entire inventory to different buyers within a short period of time. However, if it attempted to sell all its cars to a single buyer, this would be considered a bulk sale, as it is not something an auto dealer would generally do in the normal course of business.

However, not all sales in bulk are outside of the ordinary course of business. For example, farmers often have agreed well in advance of harvesting their crop to sell it to a single buyer. This is a normal part of farming practice. However, a dairy farmer, although he might sell his milk in bulk, would never sell his dairy cows in bulk in the normal course of business.

== Application ==
Although statutes vary, the legal requirements for a bulk sale generally apply to a sale of all or most of the materials, supplies or inventory of a business in a way not normally done in the ordinary course of the seller's business. Bulk transfers in the United States (U.S.) were generally governed by Article 6 of the Uniform Commercial Code (UCC). However, Article 6 has now been repealed by most states, in favor of revisions to other provisions of the UCC that apply to sales and secured transactions.

The sale of an entire inventory is not a bulk sale if it is sold to buyers in a manner that ensures adequate consideration. For example, if a merchant holds an auction sale for the entire contents of the business and the sale is in good faith, the buyer is not required to comply with bulk sales legislation. However, the buyer of a business with inventory would be expected to complete the bulk sales registration as part of the normal course of closing the sale. Similarly, if a merchant has a deep discount sale, that is not a bulk sale as deep discounts can be made in the ordinary course of business.

In the modern era, many retail businesses operate on consignment or short credit terms and so compliance with bulk sales registration in the purchase of such a business, or its assets, is generally mandatory. For example, in a typical convenience store, generally the terms of sale are on consignment (return for full credit, pay for what you keep) or 30 days net (pay 30 days after delivery), with very little cash up front. As such, little of the inventory in a convenience store has actually been paid for by the merchant, and suppliers expect to be paid out of the ongoing cash flow of the business.
