= Bankruptcy and Insolvency Act =

Canadian statute

Parliament of Canada
- Long title: An Act respecting bankruptcy and insolvency
- Citation: RSC 1985, c. B-3
- Enacted by: Parliament of Canada
- Assented to: 1985

The Bankruptcy and Insolvency Act (BIA; French: Loi sur la faillite et l'insolvabilité) is one of the statutes that regulates the law on bankruptcy and insolvency in Canada. It governs bankruptcies, consumer and commercial proposals, and receiverships in Canada.

It also governs the Office of the Superintendent of Bankruptcy, a federal agency responsible for ensuring that bankruptcies are administered in a fair and orderly manner.

== Purpose and scope ==
The nature of the Act within Canada's legal framework governing insolvency was described by the Supreme Court of Canada in Century Services Inc. v. Canada (Attorney General):

[13] Canadian commercial insolvency law is not codified in one exhaustive statute. Instead, Parliament has enacted multiple insolvency statutes, the main one being the BIA. The BIA offers a self-contained legal regime providing for both reorganization and liquidation.... It is characterized by a rules-based approach to proceedings. The BIA is available to insolvent debtors owing $1000 or more, regardless of whether they are natural or legal persons. It contains mechanisms for debtors to make proposals to their creditors for the adjustment of debts. If a proposal fails, the BIA contains a bridge to bankruptcy whereby the debtor's assets are liquidated and the proceeds paid to creditors in accordance with the statutory scheme of distribution.

With certain exceptions, the Act covers a wide range of entities:

- it covers anyone who has resided or carried on business in Canada
- it "includes a partnership, an unincorporated association, a corporation, a cooperative society or a cooperative organization, the successors of a partnership, of an association, of a corporation, of a society or of an organization and the heirs, executors, liquidators of the succession, administrators or other legal representatives of a person;" but
- partners in a partnership may be placed into bankruptcy with that partnership, but that can only occur where the partnership is located in one of the common-law jurisdictions; the Civil Code of Quebec defines partnership property as being a patrimony independent from its partners
- it does not apply to banks, insurance companies, trust companies or loan companies. (Note: insolvent financial institutions are governed by the Winding-Up and Restructuring Act.) (Note: Insolvent railways previously had a separate régime of schemes of arrangement by way of application to the Exchequer Court of Canada under the Railway Act, beginning in 1901. From 1996, this was replaced by the Canada Transportation Act. This was later repealed upon passage of the Transportation Modernization Act, with coordinating amendments to the BIA and the Companies' Creditors Arrangement Act.)
- The Farm Debt Mediation Act provides that farmers cannot be forced into bankruptcy, but they can make a voluntary assignment.
- The Companies' Creditors Arrangement Act provides that a court may order a stay of proceedings with respect to specified large debtors, whether or not they have already been initiated.

The Act governs bankruptcy proceedings, which are invoked:

- either voluntarily by a person who is insolvent,
- by a debtor's creditors, where the debtor owes at least $1000 and has committed an act of bankruptcy, or
- where a proposal under the Act has failed.

The Act also governs receivership proceedings. Receivers may be appointed by a secured creditor under the terms of a general security agreement (where the debtor voluntarily agrees), or by the court where a secured creditor:

- is enforcing his security, or
- is acting under a court order made under any other federal or provincial statute that authorizes the appointment of a receiver or receiver-manager.

Provision is also made for dealing with cross-border insolvencies and the recognition of foreign proceedings.

=== Relationship with provincial law ===
Several notable cases known as the "bankruptcy quartet" stand for the following propositions about how the Act interacts with provincial legislation:

1. provinces cannot create priorities between creditors or change the scheme of distribution on bankruptcy under s. 136(1) of the Act;
2. while provincial legislation may validly affect priorities in a non-bankruptcy situation, once bankruptcy has occurred section 136(1) of the Act determines the status and priority of the claims specifically dealt with in that section;
3. if the provinces could create their own priorities or affect priorities under the Bankruptcy Act this would invite a different scheme of distribution on bankruptcy from province to province, an unacceptable situation; and
4. the definition of terms such as "secured creditor", if defined under the Bankruptcy Act, must be interpreted in bankruptcy cases as defined by the federal Parliament, not the provincial legislatures. Provinces cannot affect how such terms are defined for purposes of the Act.
5. in determining the relationship between provincial legislation and the Bankruptcy Act, the form of the provincial interest created must not be allowed to triumph over its substance. The provinces are not entitled to do indirectly what they are prohibited from doing directly.
6. there need not be any provincial intention to intrude into the exclusive federal sphere of bankruptcy and to conflict with the order of priorities of the Bankruptcy Act in order to render the provincial law inapplicable. It is sufficient that the effect of provincial legislation is to do so.

However, there are instances where provincial law will continue to apply:

- where the insolvent person is one that plainly falls within provincial jurisdiction (such as a municipal institution), a province has authority to compel reorganizations of bodies and debt obligations
- where a stay under federal law has been lifted in order to allow proceedings to take place, a province can still impose a moratorium on proceedings that fall under provincial law

Issues concerning the extent of federal paramountcy continue to come before the Supreme Court of Canada. In the 2015 "paramountcy trilogy," the boundaries were further explored:

- An Alberta Act was held neither to disqualify a person from driving a motor vehicle or to suspend the registration of such vehicles, because of an unsatisfied personal injury debt that had been discharged in bankruptcy.
- An Ontario Act governing the collection of tolls charged by 407 ETR was held not to apply to bar a discharged bankrupt from renewing his license plates upon payment of normal annual fees.
- However, a Saskatchewan Act that required creditors to serve a notice of intention, engage in mandatory mediation, and prove that the debtor has no reasonable possibility of meeting its obligations or is not making a sincere and reasonable effort to meet its obligations before it can begin an action with respect to farm land was held not to be inconsistent with the BIA, as cooperative federalism dictates that provincial legislative power should not be constrained, absent an actual inconsistency.

== History and development ==
=== Consolidation of pre-Confederation legislation ===
- The Insolvent Act of 1875
  - The Insolvent Act of 1869
    - Province of Canada – Insolvent Act of 1864
  - - Prince Edward Island – An Act for the relief of unfortunate debtors
    - Colony of Vancouver Island – An Act to declare the law relative to Bankruptcy and Insolvency in Vancouver Island and its dependencies
    - Colony of British Columbia – An Ordinance to amend the law relative to Bankruptcy and Insolvency in British Columbia

No specific legislation on bankruptcy and insolvency previously existed in New Brunswick and Nova Scotia.

=== Development of federal legislation ===
Significant amendments to Canadian bankruptcy legislation
Year	Act	In force	Highlights
1869	An Act respecting Insolvency	1 September 1869	applied only to traders (including unincorporated trading companies and copartnerships); allowed voluntary and involuntary bankruptcy
1875	An Act respecting Insolvency	1 September 1875	applies only to traders, trading co-partnerships and incorporated trading companies, except for banks and insurance, telegraph and railway companies; allowed voluntary and involuntary bankruptcy; made official assignees federal cabinet appointees; repealed An Act respecting Insolvency (1869); repealed all other Acts, or parts of Acts, in force in the provinces, that are inconsistent with its provisions
1880	An Act to Repeal the Acts Respecting Insolvency Now in Force in Canada	1 April 1880	subject vacated to the provinces; following this Act and for a period of almost forty years, there was no general Bankruptcy Act at the federal level; repealed An Act respecting Insolvency (1875)
1919	The Bankruptcy Act of 1919	1 July 1920	subject reassumed by the Parliament of Canada; covered all individuals, companies and other entities; voluntary and involuntary bankruptcy allowed
1923	The Bankruptcy Act Amendment Act, 1923		trustee to be selected by the estate's creditors (they were previously appointed by the government); creation of the office of Official Receiver, who could appoint a custodian for the estate to administer until a trustee had been appointed
1932	The Bankruptcy Act Amendment Act, 1932		creation of the Office of the Superintendent of Bankruptcy; provision for the licensing of trustees in bankruptcy
1949	The Bankruptcy Act of 1949	1 July 1950	repealed all prior bankruptcy legislation; introduction of summary administration and debtor proposal procedures; clarification of priorities given to various types of debts; abolition of the position of custodian; increasing control of process by creditors and inspectors
1966	An Act to Amend the Bankruptcy Act		increase of the Superintendent's investigatory powers; extension of anti-fraud and creditor protection measures; discouraging use of debtor proposals as stalling tactics; enabling dissemination of information about bankruptcies, for creditors to be able to assess customers' creditworthiness; added a new Part X to the Act concerning consumer arrangements
1992		30 November 1992	the Bankruptcy Act was renamed as the Bankruptcy and Insolvency Act; provisions for consumer proposals, mandatory counselling for individual debtors, and commercial reorganizations; protection for unpaid suppliers; altering the priority given to Crown claims
1997	An Act to amend the Bankruptcy and Insolvency Act, the Companies’ Creditors Arrangement Act and the Income Tax Act	30 April 1998	provisions on the dischargeability of student loan debt; special rules for international and securities firm insolvencies; provisions regarding a priority status of claims for spousal and child support; provisions for the liability of trustees on environmental damage and claims
2005	An Act to establish the Wage Earner Protection Program Act, to amend the Bankruptcy and Insolvency Act and the Companies’ Creditors Arrangement Act and to make consequential amendments to other Acts (Wage Earner Protection Program Act)	7 July 2008	establishment of the Wage Earner Protection Program; protective provisions for unpaid suppliers, collective agreements and eligible financial contracts; equity claims cannot be settled until all creditors' claims have been satisfied; only licensed trustees may act as receivers
2007	An Act to amend the Bankruptcy and Insolvency Act, the Companies’ Creditors Arrangement Act, the Wage Earner Protection Program Act and chapter 47 of the Statutes of Canada (2005)	18 September 2009	

== Bankruptcy process ==
Bankruptcy process under the BIA
Scenario	Action		Result
if a person is insolvent	he may make an assignment in bankruptcy		the person is declared bankrupt, which will continue until discharge
if a person is a debtor that owes at least $1,000 and has committed an act of bankruptcy	his creditors may apply for a bankruptcy order to be issued against him		the person is declared bankrupt, which will continue until discharge
if an insolvent person makes a proposal under Division I with respect to creditors	and where a default is made in the performance of any provision in a proposal (not waived by the inspectors or creditors) which is not remedied within the prescribed time	the court may annul the proposal	the person is declared bankrupt, which will continue until discharge
if an insolvent person makes a proposal under Division I with respect to creditors	or where it appears to the court that the proposal cannot continue without injustice or undue delay, or that the approval of the court was obtained by fraud	the court may annul the proposal	the person is declared bankrupt, which will continue until discharge
if an insolvent person makes a proposal under Division I with respect to creditors	or where the insolvent person is subsequently convicted of an offense under the Act	the court may annul the proposal	the person is declared bankrupt, which will continue until discharge
if a consumer debtor makes a proposal under Division II with respect to creditors	where a default is made in the performance of any provision in a proposal, there is evidence that the debtor is ineligible to make a proposal, the consumer proposal cannot continue without injustice or undue delay, the approval of the court was obtained by fraud, or the debtor is convicted of an offense under the Act	the court may annul the proposal	the person is declared bankrupt, which will continue until discharge
if a consumer debtor makes a proposal under Division II with respect to creditors	where the debtor is in default for an amount greater than or equal to three payments (where payments are made monthly or more frequently), or (if less frequently) three months after being in default of any payment	the proposal is deemed to be annulled	the person is declared bankrupt, which will continue until discharge

=== Protective provisions ===
A secured creditor cannot enforce security on the business assets of an insolvent person without having given 10 days' advance notice in the prescribed form and manner.

No person may terminate or amend – or claim an accelerated payment or forfeiture of the term under – any agreement, including a security agreement, with a bankrupt individual by reason only of the individual's bankruptcy or insolvency. Similar provision is made with respect to any insolvent person upon filing a notice of intention or a proposal.

A notice of intention, a Division I proposal, or a Division II proposal, will automatically create a stay of proceedings and "no creditor has any remedy against the debtor or the debtor's property, or shall commence or continue any action, execution or other proceedings, for the recovery of a claim provable in bankruptcy". Similar provision is also made on the bankruptcy of any debtor. Directors of insolvent companies that have filed a notice of intention or a proposal have similar protection.

=== Suspension of attachments ===
S. 70(1) of the BIA provides that bankruptcy orders and assignments take precedence over "all judicial or other attachments, garnishments, certificates having the effect of judgments, judgments, certificates of judgment, legal hypothecs of judgment creditors, executions or other process against the property of a bankrupt," but that does not extend to:

- those that have been completely executed by payment to the creditor or the creditor's representative, or
- the rights of a secured creditor.

The Ontario Court of Appeal has ruled that, in the case of a "requirement to pay" under the Income Tax Act that was issued after a notice of application to appoint a receiver (but before the court heard the application), supported by an ex parte "jeopardy order" issued by the Federal Court of Canada under s. 225.1(1) of that Act, the "requirement to pay" was considered to have been completely executed on the date of its issue, and thus took precedence over other creditors' claims.

=== Settlement of the insolvent person's estate ===
The trustee/receiver must first realize the amount of the proceeds from the property that is available for payment to the different classes of creditors, and different rules apply according to the type of proceeding. They are summarized as follows:

Starting with the property under the possession or control of the insolvent person
Type	Notice of intention, or proposal	Bankruptcy	Receivership
Held in trust for another person	Exclude	Exclude	Exclude
Exempt from execution or seizure	Exclude	Exclude	Exclude
Income tax refunds for the fiscal year of the event	Add	Add	Add
Such powers over property as are exercised for the insolvent person's own benefit	Add	Add	Add
Garnishments for enforcing notices of assessment for income tax, CPP and EI liability	Exclude	Exclude	Exclude
Withholding taxes deducted at source	Exclude	Exclude	Exclude
Funds constituting a deemed trust for the Crown (other than for garnishments and withholding taxes deducted at source)			Exclude
Third party's property in possession of bankrupt		Exclude	
Goods shipped in 30 days prior to the event, and still unpaid	Exclude	Exclude	Exclude
Produce of farmer, fisherman or aquaculturist shipped in 15 days prior to the event, and still unpaid	Exclude	Exclude	Exclude
Copyrights and manuscripts for works not yet published		Revert to owner	
Property transferred at undervalue	Add	Add	Add

The estate is then settled, using the priority of claims outlined in the BIA.

The BIA's definition of property is quite broad:

"property" means any type of property, whether situated in Canada or elsewhere, and includes money, goods, things in action, land and every description of property, whether real or personal, legal or equitable, as well as obligations, easements and every description of estate, interest and profit, present or future, vested or contingent, in, arising out of or incident to property;

As a consequence, the Supreme Court of Canada has ruled that direct payment clauses in contracts (allowing contractors to make payments to creditors of a bankrupt subcontractor) do not release the contractor from its obligations to the trustee of the estate.

=== Creditors ===
The resulting amount available from the estate is distributed to the creditors in the following order of priority (with each class/subclass paid in full before proceeding to the next):

Priority of Claims
Type	Description
"Super-priority" creditors	1. wages, salaries, commissions and compensation, to a maximum of $2,000 per employee, plus reimbursement of salesman's expenses, to a maximum of $1,000 each (other than for officers and directors); 2. payroll deductions and normal employer's contributions due but not remitted to a company pension plan
Secured creditors	in order of priority, and to the extent that they have not realized on their security
Preferred creditors	1. expenses and fees of a trustee 2. legal costs 3. levy due to the superintendent 4. wages, salaries, commissions, compensation, and reimbursement of salesmen's expenses, in excess of the "super-priority" amounts shown above (other than for officers and directors); 5. the difference between what secured creditors would have received and what they actually received, because of the operation of the super-priority for wages, etc., and reimbursements 6. the difference between what secured creditors would have received and what they actually received, because of the operation of the super-priority for pension plan contributions 7. alimony, support and maintenance payments 8. municipal taxes due and unpaid for the previous two years, to the extent that they do not constitute a secured claim 9. rent due and unpaid for the previous three months, plus a maximum of three months' accelerated rent due under the terms of the lease (less what is owed by the trustee for occupation rent); 10. legal costs due to the creditor that first filed execution against the property of the bankrupt 11. claims resulting from injuries to employees for which workers' compensation laws do not apply
Unsecured creditors	all remaining creditors (whose claims are not postponed below) subject to any subordination agreements that may be in place
Postponed claims	1. creditors not at arm's length with the debtor 2. silent partners (i.e., lenders who earn interest that varies with the level of profits, or that share in the profits); 3. wages, salaries, commissions, compensation and reimbursements due to officers and directors
equity claims	settled only after all non-equity claims are settled in full

There are several important notes to consider in assessing the above priorities:

- claims may include amounts that would have been statute-barred prior to the bankruptcy
- all claims in each class are paid rateably
- receivership and CCAA proceedings may proceed directly into bankruptcy proceedings after the super-priority and secured creditors have been settled in full, in order to vary the priority in which certain other items must be settled
- participation in the claims process does not preclude any other remedies creditors may have available. For example, guarantees may be called, with the guarantors having the subsequent right to make a claim against the estate for the amounts they were required to pay. Guarantees can normally be demanded by suppliers from officers and directors, and parent company guarantees are also common. Financial institutions, in order to fully realize on secured obligations of a debtor, will normally require guarantors to execute a "Guarantee and Postponement of Claim", which prevents the guarantor from filing a claim against the estate until the secured creditor has been paid in full.

Every creditor must prove his claim and a creditor who does not prove his claim is not entitled to any distribution of the proceeds from bankrupt's estate. The claim must be delivered to the trustee in bankruptcy and the trustee in bankruptcy must examine every proof of claim and can request further proof. The trustee may disallow, in whole or in part, any claim of right to a priority under the BIA or security. Generally, the test of proving the claim before the trustee in bankruptcy is very low, and a claim is proved unless it is too "remote and speculative". The rationale for such a low test is to discharge as many claims as possible to allow the bankrupt to make a fresh start after the discharge.

Creditors also have the ability, with the approval of the court, to take over a cause of action that the trustee has decided not to pursue.

=== Effect of discharge ===
Discharge does not extinguish claims that are provable in bankruptcy. It releases the debtor from such claims, and creditors cease to be able to enforce them.

Some liabilities are not released upon discharge, including:

1. any fine, penalty, restitution or similar order imposed by a court,
2. any award of damages by a court in civil proceedings arising from bodily harm, sexual assault or wrongful death,
3. any debt or liability for alimony or alimentary pension,
4. any debt or liability arising under a judicial decision or agreement relating to maintenance or support,
5. any debt or liability arising out of fraud, embezzlement, misappropriation or defalcation while acting in a fiduciary capacity,
6. any debt or liability resulting from obtaining property or services by false pretences or fraudulent misrepresentation (other than one arising from an equity claim),
7. liability for the dividend that a creditor would have been entitled to receive on any provable claim not disclosed to the trustee (unless the creditor knew of the bankruptcy and failed to take steps to prove his claim),
8. any student loans where the date of bankruptcy occurs while the bankrupt is a student, or within seven years after ceasing to be so (but relief is available where the bankrupt acted in good faith during the bankruptcy and financial difficulties will continue so that such debt can never be paid off), plus
9. any interest accrued with respect to any of the above debts.

Directors and parties related to the bankrupt may still be held personally liable for certain tax debts, and, if a clearance certificate is not obtained from the tax authorities prior to discharge, directors' liability will subsequently resume. Directors can also be held accountable for other liabilities arising from bankruptcy, regulatory and other statutory offences.

=== Preferences and transfers at undervalue ===
In 2009, the Act was amended to reform the rules relating to setting aside any preferences, or transfers at undervalue, occurring before the initial bankruptcy event:

Section	Applies to	At arm's length	Not at arm's length	Additional remedies available
S. 95 (preferences)	A transfer of property made, a provision of services made, a charge on property made, a payment made, an obligation incurred or a judicial proceeding taken or suffered by an insolvent person where: the transferor is insolvent at the time of transfer; the transfer is made with a view to prefer	Applies to any payment made within three months of the initial event, and, in the absence of evidence to the contrary, it is presumed to have been made with intent	Applies to any payment made within 12 months of the initial event, and there is no need to prove intent	A trustee may also make a claim under provincial assignments and preferences legislation where: a debtor mas made a payment to one of its creditors, the debtor was insolvent when the payment took place, and; the debtor intended to prefer that creditor over other creditors
S. 96 (transfers at undervalue)	A disposition of property or provision of services, for which the consideration received by the debtor is either nil or conspicuously less than the fair market value of the consideration given by the debtor.	On application by the trustee, the court may declare a transfer void where: the transfer was at undervalue; it occurred within one year of the initial event; the debtor was insolvent at the time of transfer, or rendered insolvent by the transfer; the debtor intended to defraud, defeat or delay creditors (and such intent must be proved)	The trustee need only prove to the court that: the transfer was under value, and; it occurred within one year of the initial event	A trustee usually makes a claim under provincial fraudulent conveyance legislation at the same time as a s. 96 claim, in order to set aside the transfer. If valuable consideration has been given for the transfer, the trustee must prove that both the bankrupt and the transferee intended to defeat, hinder or delay the creditors.

Recovery actions under ss. 95 and 96, as for other recovery actions with respect to collections, can only be initiated by the trustee, even when they may be of benefit only to a secured creditor (unless creditors seek court approval under s. 38 to pursue the matter directly).

The Act already empowered the court to inquire into circumstances where a bankrupt corporation had paid cash dividends or redeemed shares where the corporation was insolvent, or where the transactions made it so, during the 12 months prior to its bankruptcy. In that regard,

- the directors may be held jointly and severally liable for the amounts in question (unless they prove that they acted in good faith, or individual directors can prove that they had protested such payment)
- shareholders related to any of the directors held liable may also be declared liable for the amount they had received as payment
- existing powers under the applicable incorporating Act allowing the directors to recover such payments are not affected

S. 95(2) provides that, where a preference is given, the fact that it may have been given under pressure is irrelevant. However, the courts have ruled that a payment may withstand challenge by a trustee where it is made in furtherance of a reasonable business imperative.

== Key actors in the procedure ==
=== Bankruptcy court ===
The provincial Superior Courts have "such jurisdiction at law and in equity" as will enable them to exercise bankruptcy process under the Act. The decisions of the court are enforceable in the courts of other Canadian provinces and all courts and the officers of all courts must act and co-operate in all bankruptcy matters. Appeal from the court's orders lies to the provincial Court of Appeal where:

1. the point at issue involves future rights;
2. the order or decision is likely to affect other cases of a similar nature in the bankruptcy proceedings;
3. the property involved in the appeal exceeds $10,000;
4. the aggregate unpaid claims of creditors exceed $500 (from the grant of or refusal to grant a discharge); and
5. in any other case, leave has been granted by a judge of the Court of Appeal (but such appeal is not as of right).

Registrars of the provincial Superior Courts have significant powers in relation to procedural matters, unopposed proceedings and in other matters under the Act.

=== Office of the Superintendent of Bankruptcy ===
The Office of the Superintendent of Bankruptcy ("OSB") is designed to supervise the administration of all estates and matters to which the Act applies. It grants licenses for the trustees in bankruptcy, inspects and/or investigates bankruptcy estates, reviews the conduct of the trustees in bankruptcy and the receivers, and examines trustee's accounts, receipts, disbursements and final statements. It has specific powers to intervene in any matter or proceeding in court as if the OSB were a party thereto, as well as to issue directives providing official interpretation of the bankruptcy process to the trustees in bankruptcy and the receivers.

=== Licensed Insolvency Trustee ===
Trustees — either individuals or corporations — are licensed by the superintendent, and are appointed to administer an estate by virtue of the assignment, bankruptcy order or proposal that has been filed. By special resolution, the creditors of the estate may appoint or substitute another licensed trustee to assume the role. A trustee is not bound to accept an appointment, but, once appointed, he must perform all duties that are legally required until his discharge or removal. Otherwise, any licensed trustee can be appointed to act, subject to the following constraints:

- where, in the previous two years, the trustee had been a director, officer or employee of the debtor (or related to any such director or officer), or had acted as auditor, accountant or legal counsel for the debtor, the appointment is subject to the court's approval and conditions
- where the trustee was a trustee under a debtor's trust indenture, the court has similar authority
- where the trustee is already the trustee with respect to the bankruptcy or proposal of a person related to the debtor, or is already acting as a receiver with respect to any property of such person, he must make full disclosure of that fact and of the potential conflict of interest on his appointment, as well as at the first meeting of creditors
- the trustee must not act on behalf of a secured creditor without first obtaining independent legal advice that the security is valid and enforceable, and he must notify the Superintendent, creditors and inspectors of that fact
- the court, on the application of an interested person, may remove a trustee for cause and appoint another in his place

The trustee acts as receiver for all the estate's property, and is entitled to see its books and records. All moneys he receives must be deposited into a separate trust account. When required, he is obliged to report on the estate's condition, moneys on hand, and property remaining unsold. He is not obliged to continue the business of the bankrupt, where there is no good business case for doing so. When he has completed the duties required of him for administering the estate, he shall apply to the court for a discharge, but any interested person may file an objection to having the discharge take place.

All property of the bankruptcy vests in the trustee from the date of the bankruptcy, and the trustee may register a bankruptcy order against any real property in which the bankrupt has any interest or estate. The courts have held that trustees should clearly communicate to the bankrupt their intent to make a claim against the non-exempt equity in the bankrupt's property at the time of the assignment into bankruptcy. Failure to do so may result in:

- the trustee being unable to realize any of the non-exempt equity, or
- the absolute discharge of the bankrupt, without requiring him to pay to the estate the price agreed upon for the right to sell the property.

The superintendent may undertake conservatory measures in order to protect an estate, as well as the rights of the creditors and debtors, in specified circumstances:

- the death, removal or incapacity of the trustee
- an inquiry or investigation into the trustee's conduct
- the trustee's insolvency
- a trustee having been found guilty of an indictable offence
- circumstances where the Superintendent is considering the cancellation of the trustee's license

=== Inspectors ===
At the first meeting of the creditors, up to five individuals may be appointed to be inspectors of the estate (except where the creditors decide that that is not necessary). No inspector may be appointed if he is a party to any contested action or proceeding against the estate. Where the value of an individual debtor's property is under $15,000, inspectors are not appointed (except where the creditors decide otherwise).

The trustee is required to obtain the inspectors' permission before carrying out many of his responsibilities, such as the sale of property of the estate, the institution or defending of actions relating to the property of the bankrupt, settling any debts owing to the bankrupt and exercising trustee's discretion in retaining and assigning bankrupt's contracts. The inspectors must give their approval to the final statement of receipts and disbursements and trustee's fees.

Inspectors have a fiduciary duty to the creditors and should be impartial though acting in their interest. They should supervise the trustee's compliance with the Act and the superintendent's directives, and may apply for the removal of the trustee.

=== Official Receivers ===
The official receiver is an employee of the Office of the Superintendent of Bankruptcy that is appointed by the Governor in Council.

The official receiver must do what "practicality demands" to preserve the assets and must not go beyond what is necessary in the circumstances.

=== Interim receivers ===
The court may appoint an interim receiver:

- at any time after the filing of an application for a bankruptcy order and before a bankruptcy order is made,
- after a secured creditor has filed an advance notice of intention to enforce his security on the debtor's property, or
- at any time after the filing of a notice of intention or of a Division I proposal

In the first case, the applicant must give an undertaking with respect to the debtor's legal rights, and to damages in the event of the application being dismissed. The interim receiver can take conservatory measures and dispose of perishable property in order to comply with the order of the court, but the receiver cannot otherwise unduly interfere with the bankrupt in the carrying on of the debtor's business.

In the latter two cases, the court can only make the appointment if it is shown that it is necessary for the protection of the debtor's estate, or in the interest of the creditor(s).

The courts have set out the following factors to be considered in exercising discretion on whether to appoint an interim receiver:

- whether the person is in control of the property
- whether the debtor is acting in bad faith and giving preferences to other creditors
- whether the debtor is fraudulently disposing and concealing his assets
- allegations of criminal offenses have been made
- the debtor's property is in the possession of third parties

== See also ==
- Commercial insolvency in Canada
- Consumer bankruptcy in Canada
- Insolvency law of Canada
