= Peoples Department Stores Inc (Trustee of) v Wise =

- Supreme Court of Canada

Hearing: May 11, 2004 Judgment: October 29, 2004
- Full case name: Caron Bélanger Ernst & Young Inc, in its capacity as Trustee to the bankruptcy of Peoples Department Stores Inc/Magasins à rayons Peoples inc v Lionel Wise, Ralph Wise and Harold Wise and Chubb Insurance Company of Canada
- Citations: 2004 SCC 68; [2004] 3 SCR 461
- Prior history: APPEAL from Magasins à rayons Peoples Inc. c. Caron, Bélanger, Ernst & Young Inc., 2003 CanLII 47928 (5 February 2003), setting aside a decision of the Superior Court (1998), 23 C.B.R. (4th) 200.
- Ruling: Appeal dismissed.

Court membership
- Chief Justice: Beverley McLachlin; Puisne Justices: Frank Iacobucci, John C. Major, Michel Bastarache, Ian Binnie, Louise Arbour, Louis LeBel, Marie Deschamps, Morris Fish

Reasons given
- Unanimous reasons by: Major and Deschamps JJ
- Iacobucci J took no part in the consideration or decision of the case.

Laws applied
- Canada Business Corporations Act

Peoples Department Stores Inc (Trustee of) v Wise, 2004 SCC 68 is a major Supreme Court of Canada decision on the scope of the fiduciary duty upon directors and officers of a corporation. When examining the duty of directors under section 122(1) of the Canada Business Corporations Act ("CBCA"), the Court held that there is a distinction between the interests of the corporation and those of the stakeholders and creditors.

== Background ==
The Wise Stores Inc. was a retail store chain whose shares were primarily held by the three Wise brothers. In 1992, it acquired Peoples Department Store, a competitor. From 1994, the Wise brothers' business interests went through a difficult time. To reduce costs, they developed a scheme where certain inventory would be purchased through Peoples and then transferred to Wise on credit. Soon, Wise owed more than $18 million to Peoples. By 1995, both Wise and Peoples declared bankruptcy. The creditors for Peoples brought an action against the Wise brothers for breach of their fiduciary duties as directors under section 122(1) of the CBCA by implementing the credit scheme.

The Trustees argued the Wise brothers favoured the interests of Wise Stores over that of Peoples.

At trial, the Quebec Superior Court found that the Wise brothers breached their fiduciary duty. This decision was overturned by the Quebec Court of Appeal.

== Opinion of the Court ==
In a unanimous decision written by Major and Deschamps JJ, the Court upheld the decision of the Court of Appeal, but for different reasons. The Court of Appeal had relied heavily on the SCC's ruling in 373409 Alberta Ltd (Receiver of) v Bank of Montreal in reaching its decision. However, that case was concerned with the corporation's rights, and not with creditors' rights. The reliance was misplaced.

The Court examined the meaning behind the director duty of care found in section 122(1)(b) of the CBCA. In considering the existence of a fiduciary duty owed by directors, the Court examined the wording of section 122(1) and found the duty was owed to the company, and the interests of the company were not to be confused with those of the creditors. When examining the standard of the duty, they noted that the wording "in comparable circumstances" meant an objective standard was required:

To say that the standard is objective makes it clear that the factual aspects of the circumstances surrounding the action of the director or officer are important in the case of the s.122(1)(b) duty of care, as opposed to the subjective motivation of the director or officer, which is the central focus of the statutory fiduciary duty of s.122(1)(a) of the CBCA.

They then noted that the duty of care will be satisfied where the director acts "prudently and on a reasonably informed basis."

They also affirmed the use of the business judgment rule in Canada, stating, "Courts are ill-suited and should be reluctant to second-guess the application of business expertise... they are capable, on the facts of any case, of determining whether an appropriate degree of prudence and diligence was brought to bear in reaching what is claimed to be a reasonable business decision."

== See also ==
- List of Supreme Court of Canada cases (McLachlin Court)
