= Canada Business Corporations Act =

Canadian law regulating Canadian business corporations

Parliament of Canada
- Long title: An Act respecting Canadian business corporations
- Citation: RSC 1985, c. C-44
- Enacted by: Parliament of Canada
- Assented to: 24 March 1975
- Commenced: 15 December 1975

The Canada Business Corporations Act (CBCA; French: Loi canadienne sur les sociétés par actions) is an act of the Parliament of Canada regulating Canadian business corporations. Corporations in Canada may be incorporated federally, under the CBCA, or provincially under a similar provincial law.

== Background ==
The Act was legislated based on a task force report organized in 1967 to provide the first comprehensive review of federal corporate law since 1934. It received royal assent on 24 March 1975, and came into force on 15 December 1975.

It provides the basic corporate governance framework for many small and medium-sized Canadian enterprises as well as many of the largest corporations operating in Canada. Nearly 235,000 companies are incorporated under the Act, including over 700 distributing or publicly held corporations. CBCA corporations make up approximately 50 percent of Canada's largest publicly traded business corporations.

As of June 25, 2019, the Act was amended to require that information about the diversity of directors and members of “senior management” be provided to shareholders. Diversity information and the rank of senior management captured by the new reporting requirements will apply to all distributing corporations.

== See also ==
- Canadian company law
- List of acts of the Parliament of Canada
