= List of uniform acts (United States) =

This is a list of uniform acts.

== List ==
Title	Date
Uniform Adoption Act	1994
Uniform Adult Guardianship and Protective Proceedings Jurisdiction Act	2007
Uniform Alcohol Direct-Shipping Compliance Act	2022
Uniform Alcoholism and Intoxication Treatment Act	1971
Uniform Anatomical Gift Act	2006, 2007
Uniform Antitrust Pre-Merger Notification Act	2024
Uniform Apportionment of Tort Responsibility Act	2002, 2003
Uniform Arbitration Act	2000
Uniform Assignment for Benefit of Creditors Act	2025
Uniform Assignment of Rents Act	2005
Uniform Athlete Agents Act	2000, 2015, 2019
Uniform Act to Secure the Attendance of Witnesses from Without a State in Criminal Proceedings	1936
Uniform Automated Operation of Vehicles Act	2019
Uniform Business Organizations Code	2011, 2013
Uniform Certificate of Title for Vessels Act	2011
Uniform Certification of Questions of Law Act	1995
Uniform Child Abduction Prevention Act	2006
Uniform Child Custody Jurisdiction Act	1968
Uniform Child Custody Jurisdiction and Enforcement Act	1997
Uniform Civil Remedies for Unauthorized Disclosure of Intimate Images Act	2019
Uniform Cohabitants' Economic Remedies Act	2021
Uniform Collaborative Law Act/Rules	2009, 2010
Uniform Collateral Consequences of Conviction Act	2009, 2010
Uniform College Athlete Name, Image, or Likeness Act	2021
Uniform Commercial Code	2001
Uniform Commercial Real Estate Receivership Act	2015
Uniform Common Interest Ownership Act	1982, 1994, 2008, 2014, 2021
Uniform Common Trust Fund Act	1938, 1952
Uniform Community Property Disposition at Death Act	1971, 2021
Uniform Comparative Fault Act	1977, 1979
Uniform Computer Information Transactions Act	1999; withdrawn 2002
Uniform Condominium Act	1977, 1980
Uniform Conflict of Laws—Limitations Act	1982
Uniform Conservation Easement Act	1981
Uniform Construction Lien Act	1987
Uniform Consumer Credit Code	1968, 1974
Uniform Consumer Leases	2001
Uniform Consumer Debt Default Judgments Act	2023
Uniform Controlled Substances Act	1990, 1994
Uniform Correction or Clarification of Defamation Act	1993
Uniform Custodial Trust Act	1987
Uniform Deceptive Trade Practices Act	1964, 1966
Uniform Declaratory Judgments Act	1922
Uniform Deployed Parents Custody and Visitation Act	2012
Uniform Determination of Death Act	1978, 1980
Uniform Directed Trust Act	2017
Uniform Disclaimer of Property Interests Act	1999, 2002, 2006
Uniform Disclaimer of Transfers by Will, Intestacy or Appointment Act	1978
Uniform Disposition of Community Property Rights at Death Act	1971
Uniform Division of Income for Tax Purposes Act	1957
Uniform Dormant Mineral Interests Act	1986
Uniform Durable Power of Attorney Act	1979, 1987
Uniform Easement Relocation Act	2020
Uniform Electronic Estate Planning Documents Act	2022
Uniform Electronic Legal Material Act	2011
Uniform Electronic Recordation of Custodial Interrogations Act	2010
Uniform Electronic Transactions Act	1999
Uniform Electronic Wills Act	2019
Uniform Emergency Volunteer Health Practitioners Act (UEVHPA)	2006
Uniform Employment Termination Act	1991
Uniform Enforcement of Foreign Judgments Act	1964
Uniform Environmental Covenants Act	2003
Uniform Estate Tax Apportionment Act	1958, 1982, 2003
Uniform Exemptions Act	1976, 1979
Uniform Extradition and Rendition Act	1980
Uniform Faithful Presidential Electors Act	2010
Uniform Family Law Arbitration Act	2016
Uniform Federal Lien Registration Act	1978, 1982
Uniform Fiduciary Access to Digital Assets Act	2015
Uniform Fiduciary Income and Principal Act	2018
Uniform Fiduciaries Act	1922
Uniform Foreign Money Claims Act	1989
Uniform Foreign-Country Money Judgments Recognition Act	1962, 2005
Uniform Franchise and Business Opportunities Act	1987
Uniform Fraudulent Transfer Act	1984
Uniform Gifts to Minors Act
Uniform Guardianship and Protective Proceedings Act	1997
Uniform Guardianship, Conservatorship, and Other Protective Arrangements Act	2017
Uniform Health-Care Decisions Act	1993, 2023
Uniform Health-Care Information Act	1985
Uniform International Wills Act	1977
Uniform Interstate and International Procedure Act	1962
Uniform Interstate Arbitration of Death Taxes Act	1943
Uniform Interstate Compromise of Death Taxes Act	1943
Uniform Interstate Depositions and Discovery Act	2007
Uniform Interstate Enforcement of Domestic Violence Protection Orders Act	2000, 2002
Uniform Interstate Family Support Act	1992, 1996, 2001, 2008
Uniform Intestacy, Wills, and Donative Transfers Act	1991, 1993
Uniform Judicial Interview of Children Act	2025
Uniform Land Security Interest Act	1985
Uniform Land Transactions Act	1975
Uniform Law on Notarial Acts	1982, 2010
Uniform Limited Cooperative Association Act	2007, 2013, 2024
Uniform Limited Liability Company Act	1996, 2013, 2024
Uniform Limited Partnership Act	1916, 1976, 1983, 1985, 2001, 2013, 2024
Uniform Management of Institutional Funds Act	1972
Uniform Management of Public Employee Retirement Systems Act	1997
Uniform Mandatory Disposition of Detainers Act	1958
Uniform Marital Property Act	1983
Uniform Marketable Title Act	1990
Uniform Marriage and Divorce Act	1970, 1973
Uniform Mediation Act	2003
Uniform Military and Overseas Voters Act	2010
Uniform Money Services Act	2000, 2004
Uniform Mortgage Modification Act	2024
Uniform Multiple-Person Accounts Act	1969, 1989
Uniform Nonparent Custody and Visitation Act	2018
Uniform Nonprobate Transfers On Death	1989
Uniform Law on Notarial Acts	2010, 2018, 2021
Uniform Parentage Act	1973, 2000, 2017
Uniform Partition of Heirs Property Act	2010
Uniform Partnership Act	1914, 1994, 1997, 2013, 2024
Uniform Periodic Payment of Judgments Act	1990
Uniform Photographic Copies As Evidence Act	1949
Uniform Planned Community Act	1980
Uniform Post-Conviction Procedure Act	1980
Uniform Power of Attorney Act	2006
Uniform Powers of Appointment Act	2013
Uniform Premarital Agreement Act	1983
Uniform Premarital and Marital Agreements Act	2012
Uniform Pretrial Detention Act	1989
Uniform Pretrial Release and Detention Act	2020
Uniform Principal and Income Act	1997, 2001
Uniform Probate Code	1969, 1975, 1982, 1987, 1989, 1990, 1991, 1997, 1998, 2002, 2003, 2006, 2008, 2010, 2019
Uniform Protected Series Act	2017, 2024
Uniform Prudent Investor Act	1994
Uniform Prudent Management of Institutional Funds Act	2006
Uniform Public Expression Protection Act	2020
Uniform Punitive Damages Act	1996
Uniform Putative and Unknown Fathers Act	1988
Uniform Real Estate Cooperative Act	1981
Uniform Real Estate Time-Share Act	1980, 1982
Uniform Real Property Electronic Recording Act	2004
Uniform Real Property Transfer on Death Act	2009
Uniform Reciprocal Enforcement of Support Act	1968
Uniform Recognition and Enforcement of Canadian Domestic-Violence Protection Orders Act	2015
Uniform Recognition of Substitute Decision-Making Documents Act	2014
Uniform Registration of Canadian Money Judgments Act	2019
Uniform Residential Landlord and Tenant Act	1972
Uniform Restrictive Employment Agreement Act	2021
Uniform Rights of the Terminally Ill Act	1989
Uniform Rules of Criminal Procedure	1974, 1987
Uniform Rules of Evidence Act	2005
Uniform Securities Act	1956, 1985, amended 1988, 2002
Uniform Simultaneous Death Act	1940, 1993
Uniform Special Deposits Act	2023
Uniform State Administrative Procedure Act	1981
Uniform Status of Children of Assisted Conception Act	1988
Uniform Statute and Rule Construction Act	1995
Uniform Statutory Form Power of Attorney Act	1988
Uniform Statutory Rule Against Perpetuities	1986, 1990
Uniform Supervision of Trustees for Charitable Purposes Act	1954
Uniform Surface Use and Mineral Development Accommodation Act	1990
Uniform TOD Security Registration Act	1989
Uniform Testamentary Additions to Trusts Act	1960, 1991
Uniform Trade Secrets Act	1979, 1985
Uniform Transboundary Pollution Reciprocal Access Act	1982
Uniform Transfer of Litigation Act	1991
Uniform Transfers to Minors Act	1983, 1986
Uniform Transfers Under Nontestamentary Instruments Act	1978
Uniform Trust Code	2000, 2001, 2003, 2004, 2005
Uniform Trust Decanting Act	2015
Uniform Trustees’ Powers Act	1964
Uniform Unclaimed Property Act	1981, 1995, 2016
Uniform Unincorporated Nonprofit Association Act	1992, 1996, 2008, 2011, 2024
Uniform Unlawful Restrictions in Land Records Act	2023
Uniform Unregulated Child Custody Transfer Act	2021
Uniform Unsworn Declarations Act	2016
Uniform Unsworn Domestic Declarations Act	2016
Uniform Unsworn Foreign Declarations Act	2008
Uniform Victims of Crime Act	1992
Uniform Voidable Transactions Act	2014

== Non-NCCUSL model laws ==
=== Model Penal Code ===
The Model Penal Code, which seeks to harmonize state criminal law statutes, is in effect a uniform act but it was developed by the American Law Institute and not the NCCUSL.

=== Other model laws ===
The National Association of Insurance Commissioners (NAIC) has written a large number of model laws and model regulations that heavily influence insurance law and regulation throughout the United States.

The Uniform Auction and Auctioneer Licensing Act (2006) is a sample law, proposed by the National Auctioneers Association, intended to be used by states as a template when drafting their own legislation governing auctions and auctioneers.

Other notable non-NCCUSL model laws include the Uniform Vehicle Code, the Model State Emergency Health Powers Act, the Model Business Corporation Act, the Model Nonprofit Corporation Act, UNCITRAL Model Law on International Commercial Arbitration and the Model Vital Statistics Act (1992).

== See also ==
- State law
- Uniform act
- Uniform Law Commission
