= Uniform Probate Code =

Uniform act by National Conference of Commissioners on Uniform State Laws

The Uniform Probate Code (commonly abbreviated UPC) is a uniform act drafted by National Conference of Commissioners on Uniform State Laws (NCCUSL) governing inheritance and the decedents' estates in the United States. The primary purposes of the act were to streamline the probate process and to standardize and modernize the various U.S. state laws governing wills, trusts, and intestacy.

== History ==
Drafting of the Uniform Probate Code began in 1964. The final version of the original UPC was promulgated in 1969 as a joint project between NCCUSL and the Real Property, Probate and Trust Law Section of the American Bar Association. Richard V. Wellman served as chief reporter on the project. The UPC has been revised several times, most recently in 2019 to conform with the Uniform Parentage Act (2017).

== Adoption by the states ==
Although the UPC was intended for adoption by all 50 states, the original 1969 version of the code was adopted in its entirety by only fifteen states: Alaska, Arizona, Colorado, Hawaii, Idaho, Maine, Michigan, Minnesota, Montana, Nebraska, New Mexico, North Dakota, South Carolina, South Dakota, and Utah. The remaining states have adopted various portions of the code in a piecemeal fashion. In any case, even among the adopting jurisdictions, there are variations from state to state, some of which are significant. A person attempting to determine the law in a particular state should check the code as actually adopted in that jurisdiction and not rely on the text of the UPC as promulgated by NCCUSL. In general, the UPC has not been as successful a standardization of the law as the Uniform Commercial Code has been.

== Variations in the states ==
In Payne v. Stalley, a Michigan lawyer relied on the official text of the Uniform Probate Code and failed to check the statute as it had been adopted in Florida. As a result, the lawyer missed a filing deadline on a $3,760,909.49 claim. As the Florida appellate court pointed out in 1995, "[w]e cannot rewrite Florida probate law to accommodate a Michigan attorney more familiar with the Uniform Probate Code." The Uniform Law Commission does not list Florida as one of the states that has adopted the Uniform Probate Code.

== Basic outline ==
The UPC has seven articles, each covering a different set of rules for this area of the law:

| ART. | TITLE | CONTENTS |
| 1 | General Provisions, Definitions, and Probate Jurisdiction of Court | Definitions; rules of interpretation; jurisdiction and venue |
| 2 | Intestacy, Wills, and Donative Transfers | Intestate succession of property; procedures for making, interpretation, and revocation of wills (includes Statutory rule against perpetuities and Uniform Simultaneous Death Act) |
| 3 | Probate of Wills and Administration | Procedural rules for the probate process |
| 4 | Foreign Personal Representatives and Ancillary Administration | Rules governing personal representatives outside the decedent's domiciliary state |
| 5 | Protection of Persons under Disability and their Property | Power of attorney and rules for guardianship of minors and incapacitated persons |
| 6 | Nonprobate Transfers on Death | Rules governing nonprobate transfers, such as joint bank accounts, life insurance policies, and transfer-on-death (TOD) securities |
| 7 | Trust Administration | Provisions governing management of trusts; fiduciary duties of trustees. The provisions of Article 7 have been superseded by the Uniform Trust Code. |

== See also ==
- Uniform Power of Attorney Act (expanded upon the framework for power of attorney)
- Uniform Act
- List of Uniform Acts (United States)
