= Uniform Power of Attorney Act =

Proposed uniform law in the United States

The Uniform Power of Attorney Act (2006) (UPOAA) was a law proposed by the National Conference of Commissioners on Uniform State Laws (ULC) to create a uniform framework for power of attorney provisions throughout the United States.

== History ==
Historically, issues surrounding powers of attorney were based on the common law concept of agency. However, as states began enacting varying statutes to create a statutory framework for the durable powers of attorney, variations from state to state prompted support for a uniform law.

In 1969, the ULC promulgated the Uniform Probate Code, which created a basis for a national framework for powers of attorney. However, since a normal power of attorney ends once its purpose has been fulfilled or the principal is incapacitated, states made a distinction between this normal power of attorney and a durable power of attorney, which "remains in effect even when the principal becomes incapacitated." This prompted to ULC to create a uniform law regarding Durable Power of Attorney, which superseded the original Uniform Probate Code.

== Act ==
The UPOAA was designed to correct shortcomings of both the Uniform Probate Code and the Durable Power of Attorney by superseding them both. It consisted of four distinct articles:

1. The general rules governing the "creation and use" of power of attorney
2. The definitions used by the UPOAA
3. An optional form for use in granting power of attorney
4. Other miscellaneous provisions regarding the UPOAA and other power of attorney laws

== Adoption ==
The ULC officially approved of the UPOAA and recommend that states adopt it in 2006.

As of 2019, 26 states have adopted and enacted the UPOAA.

== See also ==
- Uniform Act
- List of Uniform Acts (United States)
- Power of attorney
