= Uniform Interstate Depositions and Discovery Act =

The Uniform Interstate Depositions and Discovery Act (UIDDA) is a model statute adopted by a majority of U.S. states to establish a uniform process for obtaining depositions and discovery in concert with other participating states. In 2007 the Uniform Law Commission (then primarily referred to as the National Conference of Commissioners on Uniform State Laws) promulgated, and recommended all states enact, the UIDDA. To identify at which stage of enactment the various states and territories are, ULC maintains an up-to-date map.
