= Uniform Real Property Electronic Recording Act =

The Uniform Real Property Electronic Recording Act (URPERA), and its periodic revisions, is one of the Uniform Acts drafted by the National Conference of Commissioners on Uniform State Laws (NCCUSL) with the intention of harmonizing state laws in force in the states.

== Purpose ==
The purpose of the URPERA is to allow county clerks and recorders to electronically record information on real property and land records.

== Adoptions ==
As of August 2021, the URPERA has been adopted in 37 states, the District of Columbia, and Washington, DC, and continues to be introduced by state legislatures for adoption.
