= Maurice A. Hartnett III =

American judge (1927–2009)

Justice of the Delaware Supreme Court
- In office 1994 – June 30, 2000
- Appointed by: Thomas Carper

Personal details
- Born: January 20, 1927 Dover, Delaware, US
- Died: May 11, 2009 (aged 82) Seaford, Delaware, US
- Education: University of Delaware (B.A., M.Ed.); Georgetown Law School; George Washington University Law School (J.D.)

Maurice A. Hartnett III (January 20, 1927 – May 11, 2009) was an American jurist who served as a Justice of the Supreme Court of Delaware and a Delaware Court of Chancery judge.

== Early life and education ==
Maurice A. Hartnett III was born on January 20, 1927, in Dover, Delaware, to Maurice A. Hartnett Jr, a local businessman and politician, and Anne Louise Morris. He graduated from Dover High School in 1945 and subsequently served in the United States Army until 1947. He received a Bachelor of Science degree in political science from the University of Delaware in 1951. His father encouraged him to pursue a legal career, despite his initial plan to join the family lumber business, M.A. Hartnett, Inc. He attended Georgetown Law School before transferring and ultimately receiving his Juris Doctor (J.D.) from George Washington University Law School in 1954. During his legal studies in 1953, he clerked for Charles L. Terry Jr. of the Superior Court of Delaware. He furthered his education by obtaining a Master of Education (M.Ed.) from the University of Delaware in 1957.

== Career ==
Hartnett's legal career began with his admission to the Delaware Bar in 1955, followed by admission to the bar of the United States District Court for the District of Delaware in 1956 and the bar of the Supreme Court of the United States in 1963. For over two decades, he maintained a private law practice in Dover, Delaware, focusing on business and real estate law. His clients included banks and automobile dealerships.

Alongside his private practice, Hartnett held a number of public service positions. He served as attorney for the Delaware House of Representatives (1959–1960), executive director of the Legislative Reference Bureau (1961–1969), Delaware Code Reviser (1961–1972), and attorney for the Kent County Levy Court (1970–1976). He also served as Master in Family Court for Kent County (1959–1960).

He also served in various commissions and committees. These included the Merit System Study Commission (1966), the Delaware Constitutional Revision Commission (1968–1969), and the Delaware Long-Range Courts Committee (1975–1994). He chaired the State Tax Appeals Board (1973–1976) and the Delaware Supreme Court Uniform Rules of Evidence Committee (1977), and served as Secretary of the Uniform Commercial Code Study Committee (1964).

Hartnett was a long-time member of the National Conference of Commissioners on Uniform State Laws (since 1961), where he served as Secretary and on the Executive Committee. He also chaired drafting committees for several uniform acts, including the Uniform Exemptions Act, the Uniform Statute and Rule Construction Act, and the Uniform Trust Code. His professional memberships included the American Bar Association, the Kent County Bar Association (president, 1974), and the American Law Institute.

=== Judicial service ===
In 1976, Governor Sherman W. Tribbitt appointed Hartnett as a Vice-Chancellor of the Delaware Court of Chancery and was reappointed in 1988 by Governor Mike Castle. During his tenure on the court, he presided over a variety of corporate cases. In 1994, Governor Tom Carper appointed him to the Supreme Court of Delaware as a Justice. He served in this capacity until June 30, 2000, and continued to serve by special assignment for several years thereafter.

== Personal life ==
Hartnett was married to Elizabeth Anne Hartnett. They had one daughter, Anne Hartnett Reigle, who became a judge herself.

He was a member of Holy Cross Church in Dover, where he served as Parish Council President and was involved in the construction of a new church building. He also served as a Rehoboth Beach commissioner (1972–1976), was a founder of the Rehoboth Bay Sailing Association, and participated in the local American Legion post.

== Death ==
Hartnett died on May 11, 2009, in Seaford, Delaware. Following his death, Governor Jack Markell ordered that all US and Delaware flags at state facilities be flown at half-staff. Chief Justice Myron Steele also ordered flags at all state courthouses to be lowered to half-staff in his honor.

Political offices
Preceded by	Justice of the Delaware Supreme Court; 1994–2000	Succeeded by
