= United States trust law =

Law regulating a wealth-holding legal instrument

United States trust law is the body of law that regulates the legal instrument for holding wealth known as a trust.

Most of the law regulating the creation and administration of trusts in the United States is now statutory at the state level. In August 2004, the National Conference of Commissioners on Uniform State Laws created the first attempt to codify generally accepted common law principles in Anglo-American law regarding trusts into a uniform statutory code for the fifty states, called the Uniform Trust Code (UTC). As of July 2012, 25 states have adopted some substantive form of the UTC, with three others having introduced it into the legislature for adoption.

The goal of the uniform law is to standardize the law of trusts to a greater extent, given their increased use as a substitute for the "last will and testament" as the primary estate planning mechanism for the affluent. Despite the uniform law, however, differences remain, as states still harbor rich differences in fiduciary law. Each state adopting the UTC has incorporated changes into their version of the Code, reflecting certain peculiar or long-standing exceptions in their own state's law that legislators intend to preserve.

== Overview ==
Trusts are essentially creatures of contract. Virtually all trusts are made in written form, either through an inter vivos or "living trust" instrument (created while the settlor is living) or in a will (which creates a testamentary trust). Therefore, in understanding certain terms in a trust, general rules of construction regarding interpretation of wills or other testamentary documents will apply. Subject to certain fundamental requirements of trusts, the UTC generally states that the terms of a trust instrument, as written by the settlor, will control over the "default rules" of the UTC. Where a document does not contain a provision that is otherwise covered by the UTC's default rules, the UTC will control.

Where a document contains obnoxious, unworkable, impractical, or outdated language, the beneficiaries and trustees have recourse to local courts having general jurisdiction in equity – most commonly for a declaratory judgment, judicial construction or reformation of the trust to bring it into compliance with the original intent of the settlor. Also, the court may be called upon to deal with circumstances not imaginable by the settlor at the time the trust was created to make the trust cy pres or as close as possible to the original intent.

Trusts are a special breed of contract in that they often govern the disposition of property in the same way a "last will and testament" does via a probate proceeding. Many states differ as to their procedures concerning the interpretation and administration of trusts created during life (i.e., the inter vivos trust) versus those created in a will which are typically subject to jurisdiction in probate proceedings (the testamentary trust). The UTC attempts to standardize the general composition of both trust forms and their requirements, but does not generally attempt to address the procedural questions as to overall subject-matter jurisdiction and other aspects of proceedings involving trusts. Instead, the vagarities of various state and local procedural rules will generally apply.

When titling property or otherwise referring to an existing trust, practitioners persist in referring to trusts as "Tr. u/a" (trusts under agreement, i.e., inter vivos trusts) or "Tr. u/w" (trusts under will, i.e., testamentary trusts). Industry convention is for the settlor's name to appear in the title. In the US, the name follows a shorthand for the type of instrument. Hence: "Tr. u/a John Smith FBO Alma Smith" or, if appropriate, "Tr. u/a John Smith FBO Alma Smith irrevocable" (FBO means for benefit of). Titles also frequently include more information such as the existence of more than one trustee ("Co-tr. u/a John Smith": "co-tr" means co-trustee) or that one or more of the trustees are not the original trustee (Successor Co-Tr. u/a John Smith).

In understanding American trust law, it is helpful to understanding the terminology and definitions of various terms as they relate to trusts. The following section contains a discussion of some of these terms.

== Types of trusts ==
There are numerous variations of trusts that exist in the United States. Listed below are some of the more common examples of trusts that are formed.

Type of Trust	Definition and Purpose	Tax Benefits
Revocable	A trust that can be modified or dissolved without the permission of the beneficiary. During the life of the trust, income from the corpus is distributed to the grantor. Transfer of assets to beneficiaries only occurs at the time of the grantor's death. Typically, the purpose of this type of trust is to help a decedent's estate avoid the probate process.	None. Tax issues generally proceed as if no trust had been created in the first place.
Irrevocable	A trust that cannot be modified or dissolved without the consent of the beneficiary. The grantor effectively relinquishes all rights to any assets put into the trust.	Assets are removed from the grantor's taxable estate. The grantor is also relieved of any tax liability from income generated by assets that are placed into the trust. In some jurisdictions, this rule does not apply if the grantor also serves as the trustee.
Qualified Terminable Interest Property (QTIP)	A trust designed to allow an individual to provide for their surviving spouse after their death. It allows for the grantor to determine how assets are disbursed after the time of death.	Allows marital deduction to be taken advantage of.
Special Needs Trust	A trust designed to provide for the care of someone who has a disability or is otherwise unable to care for themselves.	Can help in the avoidance of estate tax and ease the transfer of assets at the time of the death.
Blind Trust	Blind trusts are designed so that the beneficiary cannot control the management of, or see the value of the corpus within the trust. Often, in the case of public servants, or other individuals with notable fiduciary responsibility, assets are placed into a blind trust wherein they are the grantor and the beneficiary so their decisions are not affected by their personal wealth. The trustee is generally responsible for the management of the assets within the trust.	No tax benefits are typically experienced with a blind trust.
Testamentary Trust	A trust created within a will. Such a trust normally only is established upon the death of the grantor, provided that the will or codicil providing for the creation of such trust is valid at the time of the decedent's death.	Tax benefits vary based upon the type of trust created within the will.

== The "three characters" in the play ==
A trust generally involves three "persons" in its creation and administration: (A) a settlor or grantor who creates the trust; (B) a trustee who administers and manages the trust and its assets; and (C) a beneficiary who receives the benefit of the administered property in the trust. In many instances where a revocable living trust is involved, one person can serve as grantor, trustee and beneficiary simultaneously until they die. In many other instances, especially after the death of the initial grantor, there will be different persons named to be trustee(s) or beneficiary(ies). There can be more than one of any of these "persons" in a trust at any one time.

=== The settlor/grantor ===
Strictly speaking, the Grantor of a trust is merely the person creating the trust, usually by executing a trust agreement which details the terms and conditions of the trust. Such a trust can be revocable or irrevocable. A revocable trust is one in which the settlor retains the ability to alter, change or even revoke the trust at any time and remove funds from it at any time. It is sometimes also referred to as a grantor trust. See below. Unlike under older common law rules, the Uniform Trust Code presumes that all trusts are revocable unless the terms of the trust specifically state otherwise. Generally, the Grantor is also the one charged with funding the initial assets into the trust, either through an instrument (i.e., deed, security certificates, accounts retitled into the trust's name) or by a declaration (i.e., for tangible personal property without a formal title).

From both a historical and practical perspective, trusts have generally been designed to have only one grantor. This is due to the complications that can arise, particularly in non-community property jurisdictions, in determining the nature of property deposited into the trust and the proportionality of the multiple grantors' contributions within it. However, a growing trend for husbands and wives is to create "joint trusts" where both are "grantors" of the trust, thus mirroring the familiar concept of joint tenancy ownership.

For a revocable trust, the grantor retains the power to direct transactions for the trust, even if a third party serves as the trustee. This may even include situations where there may be a conflict in the grantor's direction and the actual terms of the trust. In an irrevocable trust, there has developed a growing use of a so-called trust protector. This is generally an unaffiliated, third party (often a lawyer or an accountant) who is granted the power to amend or change the terms of the trust in order to accommodate unexpected changes in tax or fiduciary law, unexpected changes in the trust's circumstances or other contingencies. The Code permits the use of such third parties to amend or alter even an irrevocable trust. The trustee is to act in accordance with such powers unless "the attempted exercise is manifestly contrary to the terms of the trust or the trustee knows the attempted exercise would constitute a serious breach of a fiduciary duty that the person holding the power owes to the beneficiaries of the trust." Furthermore, the Code assumes such trust protectors act in a fiduciary capacity and must act in good faith with respect the trust's purposes and the best interests of the beneficiaries.

The term "grantor trust" also has a special meaning in tax law. A grantor trust is defined under the Internal Revenue Code as one in which the federal income tax consequences of the trust's investment activities are entirely the responsibility of the grantor or another individual who has unfettered power to take out all the assets. Unlike other trusts, the grantor trust completely passes through all income tax consequences of transactions inside the trust and the trust itself is a virtual shell. This is generally favorable in the current tax climate since in most cases less income will be taxed when a trust is treated as a "grantor trust."

=== The trustee ===
Trustees are the persons appointed to manage all duties required for the trust to function. In most cases, the acting trustee (and the successor to that trustee in the event the trustee can no longer serve) is named specifically in the trust instrument. A person nominated as a trustee can decline to serve as a trustee or if serving may choose to resign as a trustee upon notice to the trust's beneficiaries. Also, in some instances, the trust instrument can specify that trustees can be removed. Any Grantor of a revocable trust would implicitly hold this power with a third-party trustee, given their power to amend or revoke the trust. In an irrevocable trust, the trust instrument may, in some instances, grant the beneficiaries a power to remove a trustee by a majority vote. Absent this provision, in most UTC jurisdictions, other co-trustees or beneficiaries can remove a trustee only by court action. However, the threshold for removal under the UTC is not substantial. In most cases, all the court must find is that there has been a "substantial change in circumstances" in which removal would "best [serve] the interests of all of the beneficiaries and is not inconsistent with a material purpose of the trust, and a suitable cotrustee or successor trustee is available."

A trust can have one trustee or many. In the event of multiple trustees, the older common law rules required that all trustees act unanimously. The modern rule reflected in the UTC permits co-trustees to act by majority vote. Where a co-trustee is unable to be actively involved in the management of the trust due to age or illness, the remaining co-trustees can generally act on behalf of the trust "to achieve the purposes of the trust or to avoid injury to the trust property." However, it is generally better practice for the co-trustee either to resign or to otherwise delegate his decision-making functions while incapacitated to one or all of the remaining co-trustees. A trustee who dissents from acting in a certain way with his fellow co-trustees is protected under the Code from liability provided the trustee has indicated his dissent and only acts based on the direction of the majority co-trustees. In practical terms, the use of co-trustees can often become unwieldy. The Code generally notes this and advises great care for attorneys who draft documents that use multiple co-trustees.

Trustees may be competent individuals or state or federally chartered corporations with trust powers (usually banks or trust companies). Typically corporate trustees will have integrated their fiduciary organization into their investment management or private banking groups. It is not unusual for an individual to serve as trustee alongside a bank trustee. Both individual and corporate trustees may charge fees for their services, although individual trustees typically serve gratis when they are part of the settlor's family or the settlor him/herself. The term "co-trustee" may fool either the bank trust officer or the individual co-trustee into thinking their roles are identical. If the roles are not further defined in the document, then their roles are legally the same. As a practical matter however, the corporate trustee will nearly always do the custody work and keep the books. But many documents will give the individual co-trustee powers that differ from the corporate trustees. For example, the individual co-trustee's rights and duties may be limited to dealing with discretionary distributions of principal and income, sale of a personal residence held in the trust, or sale of a "heartstring asset."

All trustees have several fundamental duties and responsibilities imposed by the Code and general principles of long-standing common law. The following is a brief description of these duties as enunciated in the Uniform Trust Code and how they generally apply in the actual administration of a trust by the trustees.

==== Duty of prudent administration ====
It goes without saying that the trustees essentially "run" the trust. They are responsible to collect trust assets, collect receipts from trust investments, pay required expenses of the trust, enforce and defend claims on its behalf, determine what amount (if any) to distribute to beneficiaries as provided under the trust agreement, properly make a record of such receipts and disbursements, and many other tasks. The UTC generally states that trustees must conduct these activities in "good faith, in accordance with its terms and purposes and the interests of the beneficiaries, and in accordance with this [Code]." Trustees cannot act (or omit to act) if the trust's purposes are illegal, impossible to achieve or else against public policy. The standard for a trustee actions under the UTC is that a trustee must act "as a prudent person would, by considering the purposes, terms, distributional requirements, and other circumstances of the trust." In satisfying this standard, the trustee must exercise reasonable care, skill, and caution.

One of the most important responsibilities for a trustee is to prudently manage the trust's assets. The Uniform Trust Code presumes that trustees will be held to the same standard as that adopted by the Uniform Law Commissioners in the Prudent Investor Act [UPIA]. A trustee must invest and manage trust assets as a "prudent investor" would, by considering the purposes, terms, distribution requirements, and other circumstances of the trust. In satisfying this standard, the trustee shall exercise reasonable care, skill, and caution. The UPIA adopts a very holistic approach to the standards of what constitutes "prudent investing." The trustee's conduct is not to be reviewed on the basis of any one decision or one investment holding, but on the portfolio and its management as a whole. No particular investment is considered "off limits" due to some intrinsic risk inherent in it – the key is whether such individual investments are part of a trust portfolio that fits an overarching strategy "having risk and return objectives reasonably suited to the trust." Also, the trustee is not expected to have a "crystal ball" to predict outcomes with respects to specific decisions. As the UPIA states, "Compliance with the prudent investor rule is determined in light of the facts and circumstances existing at the time of a trustee's decision or action and not by hindsight." Among the factors a trustee may consider in formulating the investment strategy and the asset portfolio are (1) general economic conditions; (2) the possible effect of inflation or deflation; (3) the expected tax consequences of investment decisions or strategies;(4) the role that each investment or course of action plays within the overall trust portfolio, which may include financial assets, interests in closely held enterprises, tangible and intangible personal property, and real property; (5) the expected total return from income and the appreciation of capital;(6) other resources of the beneficiaries; (7) needs for liquidity, regularity of income, and preservation or appreciation of capital; and (8) an asset's special relationship or special value, if any, to the purposes of the trust or to one or more of the beneficiaries."

One of the primary guiding forces in the UPIA is the emergence of modern portfolio theory and the concept of correlations in the performance of various asset classes. For example, in most cases, it is established that stocks and bonds have low correlations in terms of performance in a given timeframe. This means that when stocks are better than average in performance, bonds perform lower than average. The converse is also true. This concept of correlation allows for diversification of a portfolio so that a portfolio can perform more consistently in various economic climate by having a variety of asset classes, in specific proportions, in the trust portfolio. The UPIA's default rule mandates to a trustee that he or she diversify a trust portfolio "unless the trustee reasonably determines that, because of special circumstances, the purposes of the trust are better served without diversifying." The UPIA also states that trustees should invest impartially without favoritism to one class of beneficiaries over another (i.e., beneficiaries receiving current income versus beneficiaries receiving principal from the trust at its termination.)."

If a trustee has special skills or expertise, or is named trustee in reliance upon the trustee's representation that the trustee has special skills or expertise, he or she must use them. In many cases, a trustee, particularly an individual, who may not have certain expertise in various areas (i.e., investing, real estate management, ongoing business management, etc.) may wish to use an agent who is an expert and delegate authority to that expert as to certain incidentals of trust administration. The Code permits this, provided that: (a) the task is one a prudent trustee of comparable skills could properly delegate under the circumstances; (b) the trustee prudently selects the agent, setting the proper scope and function of the agent's task; and (c) periodically monitors the agent's performance and compliance with his or her duties. Once appropriately delegated under Section 807(a), the duty to exercise reasonable care in performing that function then shifts from the trustee to the agent, and the trustee is no longer liable for any act or omission undertaken by the agent.

Many trusts provide for trustees to use discretion in the distribution of trust assets to beneficiaries. Often, if the grantor is particularly wary of the spendthrift nature of the beneficiaries, he or she may give the trustee extremely broad powers to distribute or not distribute funds. Notwithstanding such broad terms, however, the UTC generally requires trustees to exercise such discretionary powers in "good faith and in accordance with the terms and purposes of the trust and the interests of the beneficiaries." Prior to the UTC, cases such as Lineback by Hutchens v. Stout (North Carolina Court of Appeals, 1986) defined the rights of trustees to disperse funds at their discretion even in cases where the beneficiary was receiving government support.

==== Duty of loyalty ====
One of the oldest and most venerated duties of trustees has been to avoid "conflicts of interest." Centuries of English and American common law have detailed the rules for trustees to avoid both direct conflicts and to avoid "appearances of impropriety" that might compromise the fiduciary's standing as an impartial decision-maker for the beneficiaries. The trustees should administer the trust for the sole benefit of the beneficiaries, against all others who might seek to benefit or profit from trust assets.

The first cardinal principle is that the trustee should not personally profit from any transactions that occur with respect to trust property. In common law, this has generally been referred as the "no further inquiry" rule, meaning that transactions entered into by a trustee for a trustee's own account are presumed suspect with "no further inquiry" and are considered voidable upon an action by the beneficiaries.

Furthermore, if trustee exercises "significant influence over the beneficiary and from which the trustee obtains an advantage" in a transaction, even if it does not concern trust property, the trustee can be held liable for violating his or her prime duty of loyalty to act solely for the trust and its beneficiaries. This usually involves business transactions outside of the trust relationship but again may have the "appearance of impropriety" due to the trustee's power over assets to which the beneficiary may have a right. The trustee can generally overcome the appearance by fully disclosing the transaction, take no advantage of his trustee position, and show that the objective facts of the transaction appear fair and reasonable to all parties. Trustees also cannot take advantage of their superior knowledge or an opportunity discovered during their tenure as a trustee to profit themselves on their own account in most situations.

This prime rule has been gradually moderated over time, based on the law's recognition that in many cases, corporate trustees engage in transactions necessarily because they are in a for-profit business. Thus exceptions have crept increasingly into the general rule. Thus, a trustee can be exonerated from the "self-dealing" rules on property in situations where: (1) the transaction was authorized by the terms of the trust; (2) the transaction was approved by the court;(3) the beneficiary did not commence a judicial proceeding within the time allowed under statutes of limitation; (4) the beneficiary somehow consented to the trustee's conduct, ratified the transaction, or released the trustee; or (5) the transaction involves a contract entered into or claim acquired by the trustee before the person became or contemplated becoming trustee. In addition, for corporate trustees, if the trustee utilizes mutual funds or common trust funds in which they are compensated for managing the fund (as well as a customary trustees fee), such arrangements are not considered conflicts of interest provided there is full disclosure to the beneficiaries of the relationship. Finally, the Code does not consider certain transactions precluded under the Code solely because they involve "others" to the possible detriment of the beneficiaries. These can include a corporate trustee that conducts transactions with other trusts in which the entity may also be a trustee, the executor of an estate or other fiduciary. All that would be required is that the transactions appear fair and reasonable to all parties.

As part of the duty of loyalty, trustees also have a duty to act impartially with respect to trust beneficiaries. If a trust has two or more beneficiaries, the trustee shall act impartially in investing, managing, and distributing the trust property, giving due regard to the beneficiaries’ respective interests.

==== Duty to keep records and report ====
Trustees are required to keep beneficiaries reasonably informed about the administration of the trust and of the material facts necessary for them to protect their interests. If a beneficiary asks for information, the trustee is charged to give it (unless the request is somehow unreasonable under the circumstances). This includes providing the beneficiary a copy of the trust agreement, notice of the acceptance or change of trustee and the contact information for the trustee, notice that a trust has become irrevocable due to the grantor's death, and any changes in the trustee's rate of compensation.

The trustee must also keep adequate records of the administration of the trust generally. All trust property must stay separate from the trustee's own personal property and must not be "commingled." A trustee can hold certain securities, usually publicly traded ones, in a "street name" or nominee registration for ease of management. However, they are still subject to the rule that such securities must be "earmarked" specifically in records to a specific trust account.

=== The beneficiaries ===
The generic term "beneficiary" under the Uniform Trust Code is defined as a person that (A) has a present or future beneficial interest in a trust, vested or contingent; or (B) in a capacity other than that of trustee, holds a power of appointment over trust property. Beneficiaries are the holders of "equitable title" of trust assets and receive the benefits of trust property, subject to the trustee's "legal title" ownership and control under the terms of the trust agreement as established by the grantor.

The Code makes a distinction between certain classes of beneficiaries with respect to the traditional reporting requirements for trustees with respect to the assets and transactions actually held in the trust. Under the older common law, only current beneficiaries (sometimes termed "income beneficiaries") were entitled to receive reports or accountings of trust transactions and that such reports were sufficient to protect the interest of those current beneficiaries. However, the Code has now permitted "qualified beneficiaries" to at least be informed of their right to receive a trustee's periodic report of trust transactions and assets and are entitled to receive it if they do in fact request it. "Qualified beneficiaries" are defined as a beneficiary who, on the date the beneficiary's qualification is determined: (A) is a distributee or permissible distributee of trust income or principal; (B) would become a distributee or permissible distributee of trust income or principal if a present distributees' interest ended on that date without causing the trust to terminate; or (C) would become a distributee or permissible distributee of trust income or principal if the trust did terminate on that date. Essentially, this means that future beneficiaries (i.e., children or grandchildren) might be exposed to information that the grantor only intended to pass to the current beneficiaries. Although the UTC limited the reporting requirements to trustees accepting duties after the Code's enactment, a number of states have changed the standard UTC language, often in response to concerns from corporate trustees of the unwieldiness of such requirements and the danger that future trust beneficiaries may interfere and create contention concerning the operation of the trust.

== Purposes of a trust ==
The purposes and uses of trusts historically had to do with management of property in absence of owner, mostly during medieval times when a lord left to fight in battle. Gradually, the device also found usefulness to control property "beyond the grave", although the so-called Rule Against Perpetuities limited this power. See trust law. In modern times in the United States, trusts have several principal purposes.

=== Asset management ===
Trusts are generally unique in that they can provide comprehensive asset management for multiple family generations over great spans of time, something which other estate planning devices cannot completely replicate. Trusts can hold title to a virtually infinite number and type of disparate assets, from publicly traded securities, to illiquid closely held business interests, to real estate, to even collectibles and tangible personal property. Unlike other methods of transferring title, the trust allows continued management of the assets, despite the infirmity or even death of the owner – allowing them to specify to successor trustees exactly how to manage the property and use it for the future beneficiaries. This can extend for multiple generations or even, in some jurisdictions, in perpetuity (as some states have permitted in some instances the creation of trusts that can last beyond the Rule Against Perpetuities).

The third-party management of property for the benefit of another is especially valuable for persons who have some form of incapacity, infirmity or are simply unwise with the use of money. Many create trusts to protect family members from themselves. It is not unusual to see a will in which four children get funds free of trust or any other encumbrances from their father but a fifth child's funds are all or mostly placed in trust. This is usually for good cause – drug abuse, demonstrated inability to hold onto money, fear of divorce, criminal activity, a wish to see the funds go to grandchildren rather than one's own children, etc. Such trusts help to conserve assets for the longer term needs of such individuals and help to slow or eliminate the "wasting" of assets through unwise purchases or losses.

In addition, the trustees' powers over the assets can be incredibly broad and flexible and do not require the supervisory eye of a court (and the attendant additional cost such oversight can create). Particularly in cases where a corporate trustee is used, the grantor and subsequent beneficiaries receive the benefits of a vast array of financial services – portfolio management, real estate and business management, bill paying, insurance claim processing, tax and legal assistance, and financial planning just to name a few.

Revocable living trusts were often touted and marketed as valuable solely because of their ability to "avoid probate" and the costs and complications that surrounded it. Although probate avoidance is certainly a consideration in the use of a "living trust", there are many other estate planning techniques which also "avoid" probate. Typically however, such alternatives do not provide the kind of consolidated asset management that a trust can. Although trusts are certainly not for everyone in the context of estate planning, even persons with modest net worths often find the living trust an ideal planning tool.

=== Estate tax avoidance ===
Trusts are often created pursuant to an estate plan for wealthy individuals to avoid the effects of the federal estate tax. Under current federal estate tax law, in 2008, individuals that own interests in any property (individually owned, jointly held, or otherwise) which exceeds a fair market value of $2 million is subject to the estate tax at death; in 2009, the amount is $3.5 million. In 2010 there is no federal estate tax unless Congress acts. An estate that exceeds that value will pay tax on that excess at a rate of 45% under current law. Naturally, this rate is a huge inducement among many with substantial wealth to use various estate planning devices to reduce or eliminate the effect of the tax for their family. Below is a brief summary of certain specific techniques that employ trusts as the vehicle for achieving such savings. At the end of 2010 Congress created a two-year window with a 35% estate tax rate and an exemption level of $3.5 Million. Currently as of 2020, the exemption is $11,580,000.

==== The credit shelter trust ====
The credit shelter trust is by far the most common device used to extend the applicable credit ($10 million in 2018) for married couples. In this technique, each spouse creates a trust and divides their assets (usually evenly) between the two trusts. The terms of the credit shelter trust provide that upon the first spouse's death, the other is left an amount in trust for the benefit of the surviving spouse up to the current federal exemption equivalent to the federal estate tax. Thus an individual would leave, say, $10 million in trust for his wife (keep the $10 million out of her estate), give his widow the net income from his trust, and leave the remaining corpus to his children at her death. The Internal Revenue Code does not consider the assets in the first spouse's trust includible in the surviving spouse's estate at death for estate tax purposes, because the spouse's rights to the principal of the "credit shelter" trust do not constitute full ownership of the trust assets. In essence, this allows the couple to now shelter $20 million in assets rather than just $10 million (at the death of the second spouse).

The "Credit Shelter Trust" can permit the surviving spouse to also access principal from the trust. However, the IRS generally limits this power to distribute principal only for the "health, education, maintenance or support" of the surviving spouse. This language is relatively broad in its practical application; however, the IRS has agreed it is a sufficient limitation to allow the "credit shelter" trust not to be counted in the estate of the second spouse when she dies.

An additional benefit of the "credit shelter" is that future appreciation of trust assets passes on to the future beneficiaries (i.e., children or grandchildren) free of the estate tax. So, for example, if the surviving spouse lived another 10 years and the assets inside the first spouse's "credit shelter" grew to $15 million, the appreciation would pass to the children without estate tax on the increased value, since the estate tax value was "locked in" at the first spouse's death.

The "credit shelter trust" generally only works for married couples since (a) the tax code provides the opportunity to shift assets between married persons for an unlimited amount by means of the unlimited marital deduction; and (b) unmarried persons attempting to do the same would be impacted by the "gift tax" during life. However, the mechanism is often useful in multiple marriage situations to allow for the use of income by the spouse while also conserving principal for the children later after the "stepparent" passes away.

==== Charitable remainder / Lead trusts ====
Trusts are often created as a way to contribute to a charity and retain certain benefits for oneself or another family member. A common technique is to create a charitable remainder unitrust ("CRUT"). Typically, these irrevocable trusts are funded with assets that are often highly appreciated, meaning their cost basis for capital gains tax purposes is very low relative to their current fair market value. This can be real estate, highly appreciated stock or a business interest with a low (or zero) tax basis.

Once the trust is funded, typically the asset is sold and invested in a more diversified investment portfolio that can provide income or liquid securities to provide an "annuity" to one or two individual persons, based on a set percentage provided for under the trust instrument and under IRS regulations. The annuity can be set for a certain term of years or can last for the lifetime of individual beneficiary(ies). Then, after the annuity term expires, the principal of the trust goes outright to a charity or charities the grantor named in the trust document.

If the trust meets the requirements of the IRS regulations, the grantor of the trust will receive a charitable income tax deduction for the calculated future value of the gift. Moreover, when he transfers the property into the CRUT irrevocably, the value of that property is out of his estate for estate tax purposes as well, even if he himself receive the individual annuity interest in the trust. In many cases, when properly structured, the CRUT can provide enough tax benefits to beneficiaries through the use of the annuity interest to justify the "giving away" of the asset to charity. However, this "giving away" of assets often causes many to forgo this technique, preferring to leave the assets directly to children regardless of the potential tax consequences it may create.

==== Grantor retained annuity trusts ====
Trusts may be created to get funds to the next generation where there is significant wealth and federal exclusionary gifts have already been used up. A common such vehicle is called the grantor retained annuity trust (GRAT). Federal tax law specifically allows for this vehicle. Here the grantor places an asset in the trust – one he expects will grow rapidly during the term of the trust. The document then requires the trustee to pay to the settlor a specific sum of money (the annuity) at certain intervals during the life of the trust. If there are assets in the trust at the end of the term, those assets go without estate or gift tax to the remaindermen. Here's a typical case: settlor owns large block of low cost basis stock in a publicly traded company. He does not wish to sell the stock and pay capital gains tax. He also has estate tax problems since his net worth when he dies is likely to be $10 million or more. His attorney drafts a GRAT in which he places $2 million of the single company's stock. The document calls for the smallest legal interest rate (published monthly by the Federal Government), which is then paid through the term of the trust. Upon the termination of the trust, the annuity has been paid back to the grantor and the remaining corpus is delivered to the remaindermen (typically children) without tax. Money has now passed from the grantor to his/her children without gift or estate tax. There has been no capital gains tax.

=== Government benefit protection ===
Trusts may be created to protect an individual's welfare or other state benefits. These are typically called "special needs trusts." Typically, an individual has Medicaid and Social Security Supplemental Security Income (SSI) coming in. For such individual to then be given access to funds in excess of, usually, $2,000 ("countable" assets), risks immediate termination of his government benefits. To assure the individual a life of some ease beyond what he can afford from Social Security checks, a family member will place several hundred thousand dollars into a special needs trust for the little extras in life: dinner out, a birthday party, some new clothes, et alia. Such trusts require the expertise of a member of the "elder law" bar and must be administered with great care. It is best to have a family member as a co- or sole trustee. Given the small size of these trusts, they are typically not profitable for a corporate trustee.

== Creation of a trust ==
A trust may be created by: (1) transfer of property to another person as trustee during the settlor's lifetime or by will or other disposition taking effect upon the settlor's death; (2) declaration by the owner of property that the owner holds identifiable property as trustee; or (3) exercise of a power of appointment in favor of a trustee. The ancient rule from English common law is that a trust is not established until it has property or a res. However, the actual property interest required to fund and create the trust is nothing substantial. Furthermore, the property interest need not be transferred contemporaneously with the signing of the trust instrument. Many trusts allow for additional deposits (cash, securities, real estate, etc.) at the direction of the settlor or others, provided the trustee is willing to accept those assets. It can even be funded after death by a "pour-over" provision in the grantor's last will, specifying his or her intent to transfer property from the estate to a trust. It can also be created by a court order or statute, imposing certain rights, duties and responsibilities as to particular property.

=== Intent ===
Trusts have certain requirements for creation. First, the grantor must show an intent to create a trust. Concordantly, the grantor must have the mental capacity to form such an intent and to create the trust. Also, if the grantor was "forced" to create the trust due to fraud, duress or undue influence, it is deemed void.

Nearly all trusts created by individuals are the subject of some type of writing (either a trust agreement or a will), which provides evidence of not only the intent to create the trust, but the intended operative terms of it. However, abiding by the old common law rules, the Uniform Trust Code does recognize that a trust can be created orally. However, to prove the terms of such a trust can only be established by "clear and convincing evidence." Such oral trusts are extremely rare in modern practice.

Occasionally, the intent to create a trust is manifested not by a writing per se but by the circumstances in which the "grantor" has entrusted the care of property to another party. This is often referred to as a constructive trust or a resulting trust. Again, such devices are generally rare and are created as the result of a court-imposed equitable remedy due to litigation between parties as to the "ownership" of certain property.

=== Definite beneficiary ===
Second, the trust must have some "definite beneficiary" – a person or class of persons whose identity can be determined in some fashion. The persons' specific identities need not be "known" at the time the grantor creates the trust; it will be sufficient if the persons can be "readily ascertainable" within a certain time period. That time period, historically, was determined under the old English common law "Rule Against Perpetuities", which required that an interest must vest, if ever, within twenty-one years after the death of a "life in being" at the creation of the interest.

There are a few exceptions to this provision concerning a "definite beneficiary." The most obvious is in the case of a "charitable trust" that is for the benefit of an organization that is usually not-for-profit and is intended "for the relief of poverty, the advancement of education or religion, the promotion of health, governmental or municipal purposes, or other purposes the achievement of which is beneficial to the community." Another exception is the much-publicized (and often ridiculed) trust for the benefit of an animal, usually owned by the grantor prior to death. Finally, a trust may be created for a certain non-charitable purpose without an ascertainable beneficiary for a certain period (21 years, under the default rules of the UTC.) The most common example of a trust for a specific non-charitable purpose is a trust for the care of a cemetery plot.

=== Active trustee ===
The third requirement under the UTC is that the trustee must have duties he or she must perform. Otherwise, if the beneficiaries are able to manage the property as they wish, there is no "trust" per se.

=== No merger of property interests ===
Finally, the UTC requires that a trust must not have the same person as the sole trustee and sole beneficiary. Under ancient common law principles, a trust could not exist unless there was at least some "title split" – that is, the same person cannot generally hold all legal and all equitable title at the same time. If the legal and equitable title merge in the same person, the trust is considered nonexistent under the so-called merger doctrine.

=== Validity of trust in other jurisdictions ===
The UTC states that a trust is valid if, under the law of the jurisdiction in which it was created, it was properly created. In most cases, this would be the law of the jurisdiction of the grantor's domicile. Trusts must also, under the Code, have a lawful purpose which is possible to achieve. For example, a trust must not violate public policy by encouraging criminal or tortious conduct, interfering with freedom to marry or encouraging divorce, limiting religious freedom, or being otherwise frivolous or capricious.

=== "Oddball" trusts ===
The UTC also covers a trust created for the purpose of caring for an animal that was alive at the time of a grantor's death or a trust for a non-charitable purpose but does not have an ascertainable beneficiary (such as a cemetery trust.) The Code imposes several limits on such trusts. First, the trust can only last as long as the lifetime of the animal (or the last surviving animal in a group) or in the case of a cemetery trust, no more than 21 years. Also, the trust's corpus can only be applied to the intended use of caring for the animal or the cemetery plot. In essence, then, a court can determine that if the trust has property that exceeds the amount required for the animal's care, the court may intervene and distribute the funds to the grantor's successors in interest.

== Termination / reformation of a trust ==
With the exception of certain charitable trusts that can run perpetually, virtually all trusts with individual beneficiaries must end at a date certain. Of course, if a grantor has the power to do so, a trust terminates when it is revoked. Grantors also may amend the trust as they see fit during their lifetime, so long as they continue to retain the capacity to do so. For irrevocable trusts, the trust terminates when a trust "expires pursuant to its terms, no purpose of the trust remains to be achieved, or the purposes of the trust have become unlawful, contrary to public policy, or impossible to achieve." Most typically, such events occur when a certain class of beneficiaries receive all trust property outright, free of the restriction of the trust agreement, and trust administration is then "wrapped" up and the trust closed.

In some instances, however, it may be desirable to change the trust's terms or even terminate the trust by a method that the original grantor did not contemplate. For example, the trust may be depleted to such an extent that the management of the trust by a professional may be uneconomical. Changes in the law or circumstances surrounding the formation of the trust after the death of the grantor may dictate changes in the terms of the trust (or the termination of the trust itself.) The most infamous example would be beneficiaries who clamor against the trustee to "bust the trust" based on the strict limits the trust (or the trustee) may impose on the trust assets. In many of these cases, the UTC provides beneficiaries (and trustees) relief to provide the flexibility needed to dispose of trust property under certain rules.

=== Reformation / Termination by consent ===
The Code, in section 411, permits the modification or termination of a non-charitable irrevocable trust if: (a) the grantor and all beneficiaries consent and (b) a court of proper jurisdiction approves it. The court can approve such change or termination even if such may be inconsistent with the original purposes of the trust. Also, if the grantor does not consent (or is deceased) but if all beneficiaries of a non-charitable irrevocable trust consent, upon a petition to a court, the trust can be terminated "if the court concludes that continuance of the trust is not necessary to achieve any material purpose of the trust." The court may also reform the trust with all beneficiaries' consent as long as the change is not inconsistent with a material purpose of the trust.

The rationale for this difference lies with the grantor. If the grantor is living and consents to a change that radically changes the trust or eliminates it altogether, the UTC permits parties to essentially undo what originally was intended not to be undone. If the grantor is dead or does not consent, the UTC presumes the grantor would not want a "material purpose" of the trust compromised, regardless of the beneficiaries' wishes.

The consent of "all" beneficiaries might seem virtually impossible to obtain. Certainly, some such "representatives" for beneficiaries are obvious (i.e., guardians for incapacitated persons, parents for minors, etc.) However, the UTC provides rules to allow certain persons as beneficiaries to represent other far-removed, potential beneficiaries and their interests. The key is whether the beneficiaries that may "stand in" and bind the distant beneficiaries is whether they have a "substantially identical interest with respect to the question...."

=== Reformation to "fix the trust" ===
The Code permits a court to reform (or terminate) non-charitable irrevocable trusts to essentially make them work better, to fix a problem that has developed due to changes in the law or surrounding circumstances, or simply correct mistakes in the trust. If the change is due to "unanticipated consequences", the court's goal under the code is to fix the problem "in accordance with the settlor's probable intention." The terms of the trust can be changed if continuing the trust under its terms would be "impracticable or wasteful, perhaps unneeded" if the settlor's intent and trust terms were the result of a mistake in fact or law, or to achieve the imperfectly completed tax consequences of the settlor.

=== Termination to close uneconomical trusts ===
The Code also contains a provision to allow a trustee with a trust that has a marginal sum of assets to terminate it. After notice to the qualified beneficiaries, the trustee of a trust consisting of trust property having a total value less than $50,000 may terminate the trust if the trustee concludes that the value of the trust property is insufficient to justify the cost of administration. A court can also (regardless of the dollar amount) modify or terminate a trust or remove the trustee and appoint a different trustee if it determines that the value of the trust property is insufficient to justify the cost of administration. Upon termination under these provisions, the trustee is to distribute the funds "in a manner consistent with the purposes of the trust." Typically, this would mean outright distribution to the qualified beneficiaries of the trust in proportion to the actuarial value of their interests.

== Income tax implications ==
Fiduciary tax law is both federal (see the Internal Revenue Code) and state. For Federal income tax purposes in the United States, there are several kinds of trusts: grantor trusts whose tax consequences flow directly to the settlor's Form 1040 (U.S. Individual Income Tax Return) and state return, simple trusts in which all the income created must be distributed to one or more beneficiaries and is therefore taxed to the non-settlor beneficiary (e.g. the widow of a trust created by the late husband), whether or not the income is actually distributed (it happens), and complex trusts, which are, in general, all trusts that aren't grantor trusts or simple trusts. Some trusts may alternate between simple and complex under certain conditions. Many but not all trust organizations do their own tax work, which can be highly specialized.

All simple and complex trusts are irrevocable and in both cases any capital gains realized in the portfolios are taxed to the trust corpus or principal.

== See also ==
- Uniform Gifts to Minors Act
- English trusts law
