= Uniform Limited Liability Company Act =

The Uniform Limited Liability Company Act (ULLCA), which includes a 2006 revision called the Revised Uniform Limited Liability Company Act, is a uniform act (similar to a model statute), proposed by the National Conference of Commissioners on Uniform State Laws ("NCCUSL") for the governance of limited liability companies (often called LLCs) by U.S. states. The ULLCA was originally promulgated in 1995 and amended in 1996 and 2006. It has been enacted in 20 U.S. jurisdictions: Alabama, Arizona, Arkansas, California, Connecticut, the District of Columbia, Florida, Idaho, Illinois, Iowa, Minnesota, Nebraska, New Jersey, North Dakota, Pennsylvania, South Dakota, Utah, Vermont, Washington, and Wyoming.

== See also ==
- List of Uniform Acts (United States)
