= SignNow =

American electronic signature provider

SignNow is a cloud-based provider of electronic signature technology, developed in the United States. The company's software-as-a-service platform is intended for individuals and businesses to sign, and manage documents from any computer. The e-signature product is also available for free on iPhone, iPad, and Android devices, which lets users upload and sign documents from their smartphone's e-mail, camera, or Dropbox account.

The signatures within SignNow are legally recognized in the same way as traditional "wet ink" signatures as the company’s technology follows the Electronic Signatures in Global and National Commerce Act signed into law by former President Bill Clinton in 2000, as well as the EU Electronic Signatures Directive.

== History ==
SignNow was founded in 2011 by Chris Hawkins and Andrew Ellis, and operates in Newport Beach, California. The two saw an issue in signature and notary fraud, and set out to revolutionize use of e-signatures with a legally binding way to add signatures to electronic documents of all sorts with authenticity, non-repudiation, and data integrity. It uses 256-bit SSL encryption to provide security to users.

To provide a resource explaining the development of signatures, the implementation of digital signatures, and the goals of signature, Hawkins wrote and published "A History of Signatures: From Cave Paintings to Robo-Signings" in March 2011. In that same month, SignNow raised $500,000 in financing from unnamed angel investors and then raised $2 million led by Khosla Ventures in March 2012.

In April 2013, Barracuda Networks acquired SignNow. In October 2017, SignNow was sold to PDFfiller. It is now part of airSlate.

== See also ==
- Electronic signature
- Uniform Electronic Transactions Act
- Uniform Real Property Electronic Recording Act
