= Uniform Computer Information Transactions Act =

American model law on software licenses

Uniform Computer Information Transactions Act (UCITA) was an attempt to introduce a Uniform Act for the United States to follow. As a model law, it only specifies a set of guidelines, and each of the States should decide if to pass it or not, separately. UCITA has been drafted by National Conference of Commissioners on Uniform State Laws (NCCUSL).

UCITA has been designed to clarify issues which were not addressed by existing Uniform Commercial Code. "Few disagree that the current Uniform Commercial Code is ill-suited for use with licensing and other intangible transactions", said practicing attorney Alan Fisch.

UCITA has only been passed in two states, Virginia and Maryland. The law did not pass in other states. Nevertheless, legal scholars, such as noted commercial law professor Jean Braucher, believe that the UCITA offers academic value.

A resolution recommending approval of UCITA by the American Bar Association (ABA) has been withdrawn by the NCCUSL in 2003, indicating that UCITA lacks the consensus which is necessary for it to become a uniform act. UCITA has faced significant opposition from various groups.

== Provisions ==
UCITA focuses on adapting current commercial trade laws to the modern software era. It is particularly controversial in terms of computer software. The code would automatically make a software maker liable for defects and errors in the program. However, it allows a shrinkwrap license to override any of UCITA's provisions. As a result, commercial software makers can include such a license in the box and not be liable for errors in the software. Free software that is distributed gratis and through downloads, however, would not be able to force a shrinkwrap license and would therefore be liable for errors. Small software makers without legal knowledge would also be at risk.

UCITA would explicitly allow software makers to make any legal restrictions they want on their software by calling the software a license in the EULA, rather than a sale. This would therefore take away purchasers right to resell used software under the first sale doctrine. Without UCITA, courts have often ruled that despite the EULA claiming a license, the actual actions by the software company and purchaser clearly shows it was a purchase, meaning that the purchaser has the right to resell the software to anyone.

== History ==
UCITA started as an attempt to modify the Uniform Commercial Code by introducing a new article: Article 2B (also known as UCC2B) on licenses. The committee for drafting UCC2B consisted of members from both the NCCUSL and the American Law Institute (ALI). At a certain stage of the process, ALI withdrew from the drafting process, effectively killing UCC2B. Afterwards, the NCCUSL renamed UCC2B into UCITA and proceeded on its own.

== Passage record ==
Before ratification, each state may amend its practices, thus creating different conditions in each state. This means that the final "as read" UCITA document is what is actually passed and signed into law by each state governor. The passage record typically indicates each version of UCITA submitted for ratification.

Two states, Virginia and Maryland, passed UCITA in 2000, shortly after its completion by the NCCUSL in 1999. However, beginning with Iowa that same year, numerous additional states have passed so-called "bomb-shelter" laws enabling citizen protections against UCITA-like provisions.

Passage of UCITA

- Maryland (passed April 2000): http://mlis.state.md.us/2000rs/billfile/hb0019.htm
- Virginia (passed 2000) : http://leg1.state.va.us/cgi-bin/legp504.exe?001+ful+SB372ER

Passage of Anti-UCITA Bomb Shelter Laws (UETA)

- Iowa (passed 2000)
- North Carolina (passed 2001)
- West Virginia (2001)
- Vermont (passed 2003)
- Idaho

=== Reception ===
There have been concerns regarding the "one size fits all" approach of the UCITA, the UCITA's favoring of software manufacturers, and the UCTITA's deference to new industry standards. Some of the other criticisms regarding the adoption of the UCITA include the inclusion of self-help provisions included in the UCITA, which first existed in a limited form in the first version of the UCITA and was later prohibited.

== See also ==
- List of Uniform Acts (United States)
