= Ucita =

Ucita, or Uçita may refer to:

- the place and former chiefdom Uzita (Florida), also called Uçita
- as acronym UCITA : Uniform Computer Information Transactions Act
