= Uniform Determination of Death Act =

Model legislation, enacted at state discretion

The Uniform Determination of Death Act has been enacted in 37 states, the District of Columbia, and the U.S. Virgin Islands. Jurisdiction with enactment

The Uniform Determination of Death Act (UDDA) is a model state law that was approved for the United States in 1981 by the National Conference of Commissioners on Uniform State Laws, in cooperation with the American Medical Association, the American Bar Association, and the President's Commission for the Study of Ethical Problems in Medicine and Biomedical and Behavioral Research. The act has since been adopted by most US states and is intended "to provide a comprehensive and medically sound basis for determining death in all situations". Brain death is a different condition than persistent vegetative state. Due to better seat belt use, bicycle helmets, and the general decrease in violent crime, there are lower numbers of brain deaths now than historically. Donation after cardiac death (DCD) is a new protocol applied when there is severe neurologic injury but the patient does not meet the criteria for brain death.

The three sections of the Act proposed for enactment read as follows.

== Section 1 ==
Determination of Death. An individual who has sustained either (1) irreversible cessation of circulatory and respiratory functions, or (2) irreversible cessation of all functions of the entire brain, including the brain stem, is dead. A determination of death must be made in accordance with accepted medical standards.

== Section 2 ==
Uniformity of Construction and Application. This Act shall be applied and construed to effectuate its general purpose to make uniform the law with respect to the subject of this Act among states enacting it.

== Enactments ==
As of 2018 the act has been adopted by 37 states, plus D.C. and the Virgin Islands: Alabama, Alaska, Arkansas, California, Colorado, Delaware, District of Columbia, Georgia, Idaho, Indiana, Kansas, Maine, Maryland, Michigan, Minnesota, Mississippi, Missouri, Montana, Nebraska, Nevada, New Hampshire, New Jersey, New Mexico, New York, North Dakota, Ohio, Oklahoma, Oregon, Pennsylvania, Rhode Island, South Carolina, South Dakota, Tennessee, U.S. Virgin Islands, Utah, Vermont, West Virginia, Wisconsin, and Wyoming.

== Unsuccessful Revision Effort ==
In 2021, the Uniform Law Commission created a drafting committee to update the act, with a draft expected to be completed by 2023. However, the committee paused its work indefinitely in September 2023, recognizing that "inertia, the political climate, the multitude of implications of changing the legal description of death, and the diverse perspectives of stakeholders" made revision of the act infeasible.

== See also ==
- List of Uniform Acts (United States)
