= Uniform Electronic Legal Material Act =

American model act

The Uniform Electronic Legal Material Act is a model act drafted and approved by the Uniform Law Commission (ULC) to create standards for authenticating and preserving digital legal documents, such as official statutes, codes, regulations and decisions. The model act was approved by the ULC in July 2011.

The act requires that if electronic legal records are to be designated official records by a state government, they must be:

- able to be authenticated
- preserved in print or electronic form (which requires backup and disaster recovery and continued usability of the records)
- and "reasonably available for use by the public on a permanent basis"

It also provides that authenticated electronic legal records from other states are presumed to be true and accurate, and that the state should use consider recent standards, the needs of users and government entities, and the standards used by other jurisdictions in its efforts to preserve, authenticate, and publish electronic legal records.

Twenty-four states plus DC and the US Virgin Islands have since passed legislation based on the model act:

Jurisdiction	Year	Bill number
Arkansas	2025	HB 1739/HB 1748
Montana	2025	HB 111
Indiana	2022	SB 131
US Virgin Islands	2021	34-0034
Iowa	2019	HF 743
Michigan	2019	HB 4779
Texas	2019	HB 402
Ohio	2018	SB 139
Utah	2018	SB 121
District of Columbia	2017	21-0890
Maryland	2017	SB137/HB165
Washington	2017	SB 5039
West Virginia	2017	SB 214
Arizona	2016	SB 1414
Delaware	2014	HB 403
Idaho	2014	SB 1356
Illinois	2014	SB 1941
Pennsylvania	2014	SB 601
Connecticut	2013	SB 235
Hawaii	2013	SB 32
Minnesota	2013	HF 278
Nevada	2013	SB 105
North Dakota	2013	HB 1129
Oregon	2013	HB 2944
California	2012	SB 1075
Colorado	2012	HB 1209

As of 2025, the only UELMA jurisdictions that have designated their digital statutes/codes official are:

- Ohio
- Minnesota
- Iowa
- Hawaii
- District of Columbia
- US Virgin Islands
