= Uniform Parentage Act =

The Uniform Parentage Act (UPA) is a legislative act originally promulgated in 1973 by the National Conference of Commissioners of Uniform State Laws. The 1973 original version of the act was created to address the need for new state legislation, because at the time the bulk of the law on the subject of children born out of wedlock was unconstitutional or led to doubt. It was amended in 2002 and in 2017. The Act serves to provide a uniform legal framework for establishing paternity of minor children born to married and unmarried couples. It allows more than two people to be legally recognized as parents.

== 2002 revisions ==
The 2002 revisions include:

- Article 1, General Provisions, has new definitions to clarify determinations of parentage and reflect scientific developments.
- Article 2, Parent-Child Relationship was kept similar to the 1973 version, only the term "natural" to describe a genetic parent was changed.
- Article 3, Voluntary Acknowledgment of Paternity, was a new addition in 2002, which was driven by federal mandates that states provide means to establish paternity.
- Article 4, Registry of Paternity, was another new addition, focusing on incorporating registry law to deal with men's rights who are not acknowledged, presumed or adjudicated fathers.
- Article 5, Genetic Testing, was expanded from one section to ten separate sections.
- Article 7, Child of Assisted Reproduction, recodified USCACA (1988), but applies to non-marital children as well as marital children.
- Article 8, Gestational Agreements is based on USCACA (1988) as well, but permits enforcement of a gestational agreement.

The UPA (2002) also omitted some substantive provisions from the original 1973 version involving child support and custody, since other state law provided for those provisions.

== 2017 revision ==
According to the Uniform Law Commission, the major changes are:

- "[B]roadening the presumption, acknowledgment, genetic testing, and assisted reproduction articles to make them gender-neutral" to reflect same-sex couples
- Adding a provision to recognize "a de facto parent as a legal parent"
- Adding a provision that a person who causes a pregnancy through sexual assault cannot be recognized as the parent
- Updating the surrogacy statutes to reflect current surrogacy practices and state laws
- Adding an article to "require that [gamete] donors be asked whether they would like their identity disclosed" that there be "a good faith effort to disclose nonidentifying medical history information regarding the gamete donor upon request"

== Enactment by States ==
=== 1973 Original ===
The original version of the Uniform Parentage Act was enacted by 16 states: Alabama, California, Colorado, Hawaii, Illinois, Kansas, Minnesota, Missouri, Montana, Nevada, New Jersey, North Dakota, Ohio, Rhode Island, Texas, and Washington.

=== 2002 Revision ===
The 2002 Revision has been enacted by 11 states: Alabama, Delaware, Illinois, Maine, New Mexico, North Dakota, Oklahoma, Texas, Utah, Washington, Wyoming.

=== 2017 Revision ===
==== Enacted ====
As of May 2026, the UPA of 2017 has been enacted in California, Colorado, Connecticut, Hawaii, Illinois, Maine, Massachusetts, Oregon, Rhode Island, Vermont, and Washington. Colorado and Illinois have enacted similar legislation.

==== In progress ====
At least two more states are considering the 2017 revision: Delaware and Pennsylvania.

1. Delaware has one bill, SB 250 (An Act to amend Title 10, Title 13, and Title 16 of the Delaware Code Relating to the Uniform Parentage Act).
2. Pennsylvania has one bill, HB 350 (An act amending Title 23 (Domestic Relations) of the Pennsylvania Consolidated Statutes, adding provisions relating to establishment of parent-child relationship for certain individuals; providing for voluntary acknowledgment of parentage, for registry of paternity, for genetic testing, for proceeding to adjudicate parentage, for assisted reproduction, for surrogacy agreements and for information about donors.)

== Articles ==
Article 1: General Provisions

Article 2: Parent-Child Relationship

Article 3: Voluntary Acknowledgment of Parentage

Article 4: Registry of Paternity

- Part 1: General Provisions
- Part 2: Operation of Registry
- Part 3: Search of Registry

Article 5: Genetic Testing

Article 6: Proceeding to Adjudicate Parentage

- Part 1: Nature of Proceeding
- Part 2: Special Rules for Proceeding to Adjudicate Parentage
- Part 3: Hearing and Adjudication

Article 7: Assisted Reproduction

Article 8: Surrogacy Agreement

- Part 1: General Requirements
- Part 2: Special Rules for Gestational Surrogacy Agreement
- Part 3: Special Rules for Genetic Surrogacy Agreement

Article 9: Information About Donor

Article 10: Miscellaneous Provisions
