= Uniform Prudent Management of Institutional Funds Act =

US law guiding investment decisions for nonprofits

The Uniform Prudent Management of Institutional Funds Act (UPMIFA) is a uniform act that provides guidance on investment decisions and endowment expenditures for nonprofit and charitable organizations. As of 2012 UPMIFA is the law in 49 states, the District of Columbia and the U.S. Virgin Islands. Neither Pennsylvania nor Puerto Rico has adopted UPMIFA.

The major change in UPMIFA compared to the previous model law (the Uniform Management of Institutional Funds Act) is that it replaces a requirement that nonprofits cannot spend below the original value of contributions or "historic dollar value" (HDV) with a new requirement that their investing and spending will be at a rate that will preserve the purchasing power of the principal over the long term.

The act also enshrines a "charitable purpose doctrine" into law, noting that investors must consider an investment's relationship with their broader social mission.

== History ==
=== Predecessor ===
The predecessor to UPMIFA, called the Uniform Management of Institutional Funds Act (UMIFA), was approved by the National Conference of Commissioners on Uniform State Laws (NCCUSL) in 1972 and was enacted by 47 states. Under UMIFA a charity could spend from an endowment fund up to the amount of appreciation above the historic dollar value (HDV), but could never spend below HDV.

As of March 2009, the North Carolina Symphony had $6.9 million in its endowment but was unable to touch a penny because North Carolina law, at that time based on the UMIFA model, said that money could not be touched because the market value of the endowment was below HDV because of the slump on Wall Street. North Carolina has since adopted UPMIFA.

=== Enactment ===
The NCCUSL on July 13, 2006, approved UPMIFA as a replacement to UMIFA, adding the P for "prudent", which emphasizes the perpetuation of the original purchasing power of the fund, not just the original dollars contributed to the fund.

A key provision of UPMIFA states that: "Subject to the intent of a donor expressed in the gift instrument an institution may appropriate for expenditure or accumulate so much of an endowment fund as the institution determines is prudent for the uses, benefits, purposes, and duration for which the endowment fund is established.

This uniform law is adopted state by state, and therefore the law may be slightly different in each state. For example, on September 20, 2010, New York Gov. David Paterson signed into law the New York version of UPMIFA called the New York Prudent Management of Institutional Funds Act or NYPMIFA.

== Impact on nonprofits ==
The major impact of UPMIFA on nonprofit endowments is that they are now allowed to spend from an "underwater" endowment if the governing board determines it is prudent to do so based on seven specific factors. Many states have adopted an optional provision to limit the spending to 7% unless the board can show that the spending meets UPMIFA's standards of prudence. This board-approved spending policy must be based on the average market value of the endowment investments over the 12 quarters (or more) immediately preceding the calculation. This aspect of UPMIFA applies only to permanent restricted endowments, which are restricted by the donor or law.

In addition, UPMIFA contains several standards of prudence regarding investing decisions and delegation of investment management.

In March and April 2009, the Association of Governing Boards of Universities and Colleges (AGB) conducted a survey of colleges, universities and affiliated foundations in states in which UPMIFA has been enacted to learn how institutions have been managing endowment spending under UPMIFA. The survey found that:

- On average, 38 percent of the dollar value of participants total endowment pool was underwater as of December 31, 2008.
- 31.3 percent are continuing distributions in keeping with their normal spending rule
- 26.8 percent are suspending distributions from funds at or below HDV
- 15.6 percent are making distributions from underwater funds at some rate less than their normal spending rule by yielding more than interest and dividends
- 9.5 percent are distributing only interest and dividends

Harvey Dale, director of the National Center on Philanthropy and the Law at New York University, said changing the law is long overdue. "There are a lot of more recent funds that have gone underwater because of the current financial tsunami," Dale said. "So what do you do? If you're in a state that still has UMIFA, you're screwed."

Rebeka Mazzone, CPA, recommends: "[Today's boards] ... need to consider what spending rules would be reasonable and appropriate in relation to the assets available, the wishes of the donor, the role that each investment or course of action plays within the overall investment portfolio, and the needs of the institution and the fund to make distributions and to preserve capital."

== Prudence and climate ==
Some, such as former SEC commissioner Bevis Longstreth, whose work informed the drafting of UPMIFA, have proposed applying the prudence standard under the act to inform questions of climate risk. In 2016, Longstreth wrote a draft interpretive release for state AGs, noting that under the act, institutions that expose themselves to investment in companies materially dependent on long-term carbon emissions (such as the fossil fuel industry) could be found to be acting imprudently and at odds with their charitable mission.

In December 2020, alumni at Boston College filed a complaint with Massachusetts AG Maura Healey, asserting that Boston College's refusal to divest from fossil fuels violated the college's duties under UPMIFA. In March 2021, students, faculty, and alumni at Harvard University filed a similar complaint, arguing that investment in the industry violates the Harvard Corporation's duties of loyalty, prudence and charitable purpose under the act.
