= Uniform Trust Code =

Model law

The Uniform Trust Code is a model law in the United States created by the Uniform Law Commission, which, although not binding, is influential in the states and used by many as a model law. As of October 2022, 36 states and jurisdictions have enacted a version of the Uniform Trust Code (Alabama, Arizona, Arkansas, Colorado, Connecticut, District of Columbia, Florida, Hawaii, Illinois, Kansas, Kentucky, Maine, Maryland, Massachusetts, Michigan, Minnesota, Mississippi, Missouri, Montana, Nebraska, New Hampshire, New Jersey, New Mexico, North Carolina, North Dakota, Ohio, Oregon, Pennsylvania, South Carolina, Tennessee, Utah, Vermont, Virginia, West Virginia, Wisconsin, and Wyoming). As of October 2022, legislation has been proposed in New York to adopt the UTC.

== Background ==
The increased use of trusts in estate planning during the latter half of the 20th century highlighted inconsistencies in how trust law was governed across the United States. In 1993, recognizing the need for a more uniform approach, the Uniform Law Commission (ULC) appointed a study committee chaired by Justice Maurice A. Hartnett III of the Delaware Supreme Court. This committee's task was to assess the necessity and feasibility of developing a comprehensive and standardized model uniform trust code. Following the committee's recommendation in 1994, the ULC established a drafting committee, again led by Justice Hartnett. This committee aimed for broad representation and included legal experts from various organizations, such as the American Bar Association (ABA) and its Section of Real Property, Probate and Trust Law, the American College of Trust and Estate Counsel (ACTEC), the American Bankers Association, and state bar associations from California and Colorado.

The UTC's development did not occur in isolation. It drew upon existing legal resources, such as the Restatement of Trusts and the Restatement of Property. Additionally, the UTC incorporated provisions from smaller, more specific uniform acts related to trusts while also superseding some outdated ones (including Article VII of the Uniform Probate Code, the Uniform Prudent Investor Act of 1994, the Uniform Trustee and Powers Act of 1964, and the Uniform Trusts Act of 1937).

The drafting committee undertook a deliberate process from 1994 to 2000. To ensure comprehensive input, they consulted with advisors and legal groups like the Joint Editorial Board for Uniform Trusts and Estates Acts and ACTEC's Committee on State Laws. The final text of the Uniform Trust Code (UTC) was approved by the ULC commissioners in August 2000. The American Bar Association's House of Delegates officially endorsed the UTC in February 2001. The following months saw the finalization of detailed interpretive comments in April 2001 and minor clean-up revisions in August 2001. In 2002, Kansas became the first state to enact a version of the code.

== Contents ==
The Uniform Trust Code consists of eleven articles:

1. General Provisions and Definitions
2. Judicial Proceedings
3. Representation
4. Creation, Validity, Modification and Termination of a Trust
5. Creditor's Claim, Spendthrift and Discretionary Trusts
6. Revocable Trusts
7. Office of Trustee
8. Duties and Powers of the Trustee
9. Uniform Prudent Investor Act
10. Liability of Trustees and Rights of Persons Dealing with the Trustee
11. Miscellaneous Provisions

== See also ==
- US trusts law
- English trusts law
- Uniform Probate Code
- Uniform Power of Attorney Act
