= Uniform Environmental Covenants Act =

The Uniform Environmental Covenants Act (UECA) is one of the uniform acts drafted by the National Conference of Commissioners on Uniform State Laws, a non-profit, American unincorporated association. The act is intended to provide clear rules for perpetual real estate interests – an environmental covenant – to regulate the use of brownfield land when real estate is transferred from one owner to another. The Uniform Law Commissioners completed the proposed act in 2003. Several states have adopted the Act.

== Purpose and scope ==
When contaminated properties and former industrial sites are remediated under the supervision of a governmental agency, there are occasionally issues requiring a long-term Land Use Control (LUC) or Activity Use Limitation (AUL) which regulatory officials seek to have recorded on the property title or deed prior to clearing it for reuse. These LUCs or AULs may list prohibitions on future uses (i.e. no residential housing or child care facilities), requirements for ongoing monitoring and remediation (i.e. monitoring and vapor extraction wells) or note protective structures and engineered controls.

According to the NCCUSL, UECA does not specify what the controls on a particular property should be, what cleanup level is appropriate, or whether a responsible party should be released from cleanup liability. The purpose of UECA is rather to ensure that future LUCs which have been created for a particular site are not invalidated by conflicts or misunderstandings with other local, state or federal regulations. UECA seeks to make sure environmental covenants are preserved and enforceable over a very long term against successive owners by applying traditional real estate law. Part of the philosophy is that if all parties to the covenant are confident that site-appropriate activity and use limitations in the covenant will be enforced, it is more likely that environmental regulators and the owners of contaminated real property will allow those properties to be developed, rather than continue to stand as abandoned and dangerous areas. It is hoped that redevelopment of the property, particularly in America's urban centers, will help revitalize those cities and serve the economic and social interests of their residents.

== Elements ==
Following is brief summary of each section of the UECA proposed by the NCCUSL. For the exact meaning of a section you should refer to the original draft text. Comments on the meaning and purpose appear at the end of each section.

SECTION 1. SHORT TITLE
Should be cited as the Uniform Environmental Covenants Act

SECTION 2. DEFINITIONS

SECTION 3. NATURE OF RIGHTS; SUBORDINATION OF INTERESTS

SECTION 4. CONTENTS OF ENVIRONMENTAL COVENANT
An environmental covenant MUST contain:

(1) A statement that the instrument is an environmental covenant executed pursuant to the [state's name] Uniform Environmental Covenant Act [and statutory reference]
(2) A legally sufficient description of the real property subject to the covenant
(3) A description of the activity and use limitations on the real property
(4) Identification of every holder (i.e. current owners, parties with ongoing responsibility, regulatory agencies, and/or local governmental bodies)
(5) A signature by the agency, every holder, and unless waived by the agency, every owner of the fee simple of the real property subject to the covenant
(6) The name and location of any administrative record for the environmental response project reflected in the environmental covenant

An environmental covenant MAY (optionally) contain:

(1) Requirements for notice following transfer of a specified interest in, or concerning proposed changes in use of, applications for building permits for, or proposals for any site work affecting the contamination on, the property subject to the covenant
(2) Requirements for periodic reporting describing compliance with the covenant
(3) Rights of access to the property granted in connection with implementation or enforcement of the covenant
(4) A brief narrative description of the contamination and remedy, including the contaminants of concern, the pathways of exposure, limits on exposure, and the location and extent of the contamination
(5) Limitation on amendment or termination of the covenant in addition to those contained in Sections 9 and 10
(6) Rights of the holder in addition to its right to enforce the covenant pursuant to Section 11

SECTION 5. VALIDITY; EFFECT ON OTHER INSTRUMENTS
A covenant runs with the land and is enforceable even in a number of listed circumstances. Property instruments recorded before passage of UECA are not invalidated by the act if otherwise enforceable.

SECTION 6. RELATIONSHIP TO OTHER LAND-USE LAW
The act may prohibit land uses otherwise allowed by local zoning in the surrounding area but cannot be used to allow property usages otherwise prohibited by zoning or similar local ordinances.

SECTION 7. NOTICE
A copy of the covenant must be provided to all owners, agencies or entities having an interest in the property.

SECTION 8. RECORDING
The covenant and any amendments to it must be registered all counties in which the property it affects is located.

SECTION 9. DURATION; AMENDMENT BY COURT ACTION
Environment covenants are perpetual except in certain prescribed circumstances.

SECTION 10. AMENDMENT OR TERMINATION BY CONSENT
Environment covenants may be amended or terminated in certain prescribed methods.

SECTION 11. ENFORCEMENT OF ENVIRONMENTAL COVENANT
Certain prescribed parties may seek civil action to enforce aspects of the environmental covenants.

SECTION 12. REGISTRY; SUBSTITUTE NOTICE
This section is intended to name the governmental agency which will maintain a master registry of all environmental covenants as a public record. The registry should include amendments and termination of those covenants. Information requirements for the registry are listed.

SECTION 13. UNIFORMITY OF APPLICATION AND CONSTRUCTION
States that uniformity of similar laws of other states is a consideration.

SECTION 14. RELATION TO ELECTRONIC SIGNATURES IN GLOBAL AND NATIONAL COMMERCE ACT

SECTION 15. SEVERABILITY
If one part of the act is found unenforceable, other portions may continue to be enforcable.

== UECAs enacted by states ==
Updated list also located at the NCCUSL's web page on UECA issues.

2005
Delaware, Iowa, Kentucky, Maine, Maryland, Nebraska, Nevada, Ohio, South Dakota, West Virginia

2006
District of Columbia, Hawaii, Idaho, Oklahoma, U.S. Virgin Islands, Utah

2007
Alabama, Minnesota, Missouri, Pennsylvania, Washington

2008
Georgia, Illinois, Mississippi

2010
Virginia

2018
Alaska

Introduced but not yet enacted (as of 2019)
New Mexico: Introduced as HB 471, Action Postponed Indefinitely

Planned for 2020

Not enacted/no information on introduction
Arizona, Arkansas, California, Colorado, Connecticut, Florida, Indiana, Kansas, Louisiana, Massachusetts, Michigan, Montana, New Hampshire, New Jersey, New York, North Carolina, North Dakota, Oregon, Puerto Rico, Rhode Island, South Carolina, Tennessee, Texas, Vermont, Wisconsin, Wyoming
