= State law (United States) =

Laws of individual U.S. states, which are separate sovereigns

In the United States, state law refers to the law of each separate U.S. state.

The fifty states are separate limited sovereigns, with their own state constitutions, state governments, and state courts. All states have a legislative branch which enacts state statutes, an executive branch that promulgates state regulations pursuant to statutory authorization, and a judicial branch that applies, interprets, and occasionally overturns both state statutes and regulations, as well as local ordinances. States retain the power to make laws covering anything not otherwise preempted by the federal Constitution, federal statutes, or international treaties ratified by the federal Senate. Normally, state supreme courts are the final interpreters of state institutions and state law, unless their interpretation itself presents a federal issue, in which case a decision may be appealed to the U.S. Supreme Court by way of a petition for writ of certiorari. State courts regularly have concurrent jurisdiction with federal courts and, where applicable, apply or are also bound by federal law. State laws have dramatically diverged in the centuries since independence, to the extent that the United States cannot be regarded as one legal system (as to the majority of types of law traditionally under state control), but instead as 50 separate systems of tort law, family law, property law, contract law, criminal law, and so on.

In the United States, most cases are litigated in state courts and involve claims and defenses under state laws. In a 2018 report, the National Center for State Courts' Court Statistics Project found that state trial courts received 83.8 million newly filed cases in 2018, which consisted of 44.4 million traffic cases, 17.0 million criminal cases, 16.4 million civil cases, 4.7 million domestic relations cases, and 1.2 million juvenile cases. In 2018, state appellate courts received 234,000 new cases (appeals). By way of comparison, all federal district courts in 2016 together received only about 274,552 new civil cases, 79,787 new criminal cases, and 833,515 bankruptcy cases, while federal appellate courts received 53,649 new cases (appeals).

== State legal systems by state ==
- Law of Alabama
- Law of Alaska
- Law of Arizona
- Law of Arkansas
- Law of California
- Law of Colorado
- Law of Connecticut
- Law of Delaware
- Law of Florida
- Law of Georgia
- Law of Hawaii
- Law of Idaho
- Law of Illinois
- Law of Indiana
- Law of Iowa
- Law of Kansas
- Law of Kentucky
- Law of Louisiana
- Law of Maine
- Law of Maryland
- Law of Massachusetts
- Law of Michigan
- Law of Minnesota
- Law of Mississippi
- Law of Missouri
- Law of Montana
- Law of Nebraska
- Law of Nevada
- Law of New Hampshire
- Law of New Jersey
- Law of New Mexico
- Law of New York
- Law of North Carolina
- Law of North Dakota
- Law of Ohio
- Law of Oklahoma
- Law of Oregon
- Law of Pennsylvania
- Law of Rhode Island
- Law of South Carolina
- Law of South Dakota
- Law of Tennessee
- Law of Texas
- Law of Utah
- Law of Vermont
- Law of Virginia
- Law of Washington
- Law of West Virginia
- Law of Wisconsin
- Law of Wyoming

== Interstate diversity ==
The law of most of the states is based on the common law of England; the notable exception is Louisiana, whose civil law is largely based upon French and Spanish law. The passage of time has led to state courts and legislatures expanding, overruling, or modifying the common law; as a result, the laws of any given state invariably differ from the laws of its sister states. Thus, as noted above, the U.S. must be regarded as 50 separate systems of tort law, family law, property law, contract law, criminal law, and so on. (In addition, the District of Columbia and the federal territories also have their own separate legal systems analogous to state legal systems, although they do not enjoy state sovereignty.)

A typical example of the diversity of contemporary state law is the legal test for finding a duty of care, the first element required to proceed with a lawsuit for negligence (the basis for most personal injury lawsuits). A 2011 article found that 43 states use a multifactor balancing test usually consisting of four to eight factors, but there are 23 various incarnations because so few states use exactly the same test, and consolidating those into a single list results in 42 unique factors. Naturally, the laws of different states frequently come into conflict with each other, which has given rise to a huge body of law regulating the conflict of laws in the United States. As of the mid-2010s, American federal and state courts were deciding around 5,000 conflict-of-laws cases each year—far more than in any other country or even any other continent.

The diversity of U.S. state law first became a notable problem during the late 19th-century era known as the Gilded Age, when interstate commerce was nurtured by then-novel technologies like the telegraph, the telephone, the steamship, and the railroad. Many lawyers during the Gilded Age complained about how the diversity and volume of state law hampered interstate trade and introduced complexity and inconvenience into virtually any interstate transaction (commercial or otherwise). This widespread frustration was evident at the founding of the American Bar Association in 1878; one of the ABA's original founding purposes was to promote "uniformity of legislation throughout the Union." There have been three major reactions to this problem, none of which were completely successful: codification, uniform acts, and the Restatements.

== Codification ==
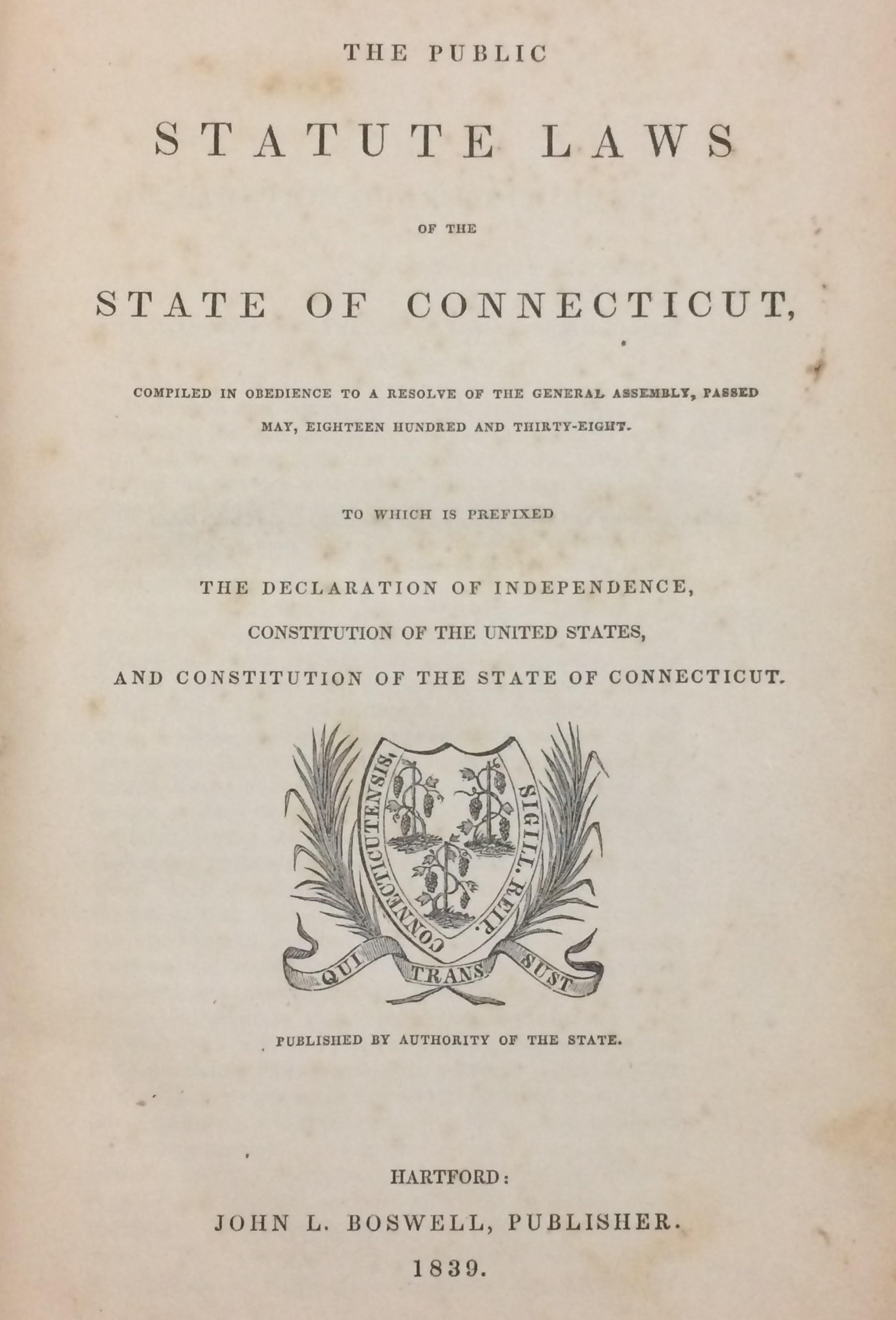
Title folio from the Connecticut General Statutes, Revision of 1838 (published 1839)

The United States, with the exception of Louisiana, originally inherited a common law system in which the law was not organized and restated such that it could be identified as (1) relevant to a particular legal question and (2) currently in force. The process of organizing the law, called codification, was borrowed from the civil law through the efforts of American lawyer David Dudley Field. Field, in turn, was building upon early (but wholly unsuccessful) foundational work by the English legal philosopher Jeremy Bentham, who actually coined the verb "to codify" for the process of drafting a legal code. The earliest attempt at codification occurred in Massachusetts with a 1648 publication.

Naturally, there is much diversity in the structure of the state codes, reflecting the diversity of the statutory law on which they were built. New York's codes are known as "Laws". California and Texas simply call them "Codes". Other states use terms such as "Code of [state name]", "Revised Statutes", or "Compiled Statutes" for their compilations. California, New York, and Texas use separate subject-specific codes; Maryland's code has, as of 2016, been completely recodified from numbered articles into named articles; virtually all other states and the federal government use a single code divided into numbered titles or other top-level divisions. Louisiana is a unique hybrid in that it has five subject-specific codes and a set of Revised Statutes for everything else. A poorly drafted 1864 anti-corruption amendment to Pennsylvania's constitution prevented its legislature from starting comprehensive codification until 1970 (after the state constitution was finally amended to add the necessary exception in 1967).

The word "codification" as used in American English can be very confusing, especially to lawyers from outside of the United States. In some contexts, especially the codes created by Field and his allies, the word was applied to codification in the traditional European sense of actually revising the substance of the law to make a better legal system―which necessarily meant abolition of some old rules in favor of entirely new ones. But "codification" was also applied to what should more properly be called "compilation"—merely arranging existing statutory law into a coherent structure to make the law easier to find, and sometimes "choosing sides between two pieces of contradictory legislation", but also expressly disclaiming authority to change statutory provisions with respect to matters of substance.

The advantage of codification is that once the state legislature becomes accustomed to writing new laws as amendments to an existing code, the code will usually reflect democratic sentiment as to what the current law is. However, one must still review case law to determine how judges have actually interpreted and applied a particular codified statute.

In contrast, in jurisdictions with uncodified statutes, like the United Kingdom, determining what the law is can be a more difficult process. One has to trace back to the earliest relevant Act of Parliament, and then identify all later Acts which either amended the earlier Act or expressly or impliedly repealed it. For example, when the UK decided to create a Supreme Court of the United Kingdom, lawmakers had to identify every single Act referring to the House of Lords that was still good law, and then amend all of those laws to refer to the Supreme Court.

In most U.S. states, certain areas of the law, especially the law of contracts and torts, continue to exist primarily in the form of case law, subject only to limited statutory modifications and refinements. Thus, for example, there is no statute in most states which one can consult for answers on basic issues like the essential elements of a contract. Rather, one must consult case law, with all the complexity and difficulty that implies. The failure of most states to implement comprehensive codification of their substantive law is generally attributed to James C. Carter, the leading 19th-century opponent of Field's codification proposals.

Major exceptions include the states of California, Montana, North Dakota, and South Dakota as well as the territory of Guam, all of which largely enacted Field's proposed civil code even though it was repeatedly rejected and never enacted by his home state of New York. Idaho partially enacted the contract portions of Field's civil code but omitted the tort sections. Georgia initiated its own full codification independent of Field, which resulted in the enactment of the oldest ancestor of the modern Official Code of Georgia Annotated in 1861. As Field belatedly conceded in an 1889 article, Georgia's code was enacted before his civil code, but he was unaware of the Georgia codification project because of the breakdown in interstate communications that preceded the American Civil War.

In some states, codification is often treated as a mere restatement of the common law, to the extent that the subject matter of the particular statute at issue was covered by some judge-made principle at common law. California is notorious for a confused approach to the interpretation and application of codified statutes: "California judges wandered between expansive construction and traditional strict construction, lingering at every point in between—sometimes all in the course of the same opinion." In other states, there is a tradition of strict adherence to the plain text of the codes.

== Uniform acts ==
Efforts by various organizations to create uniform acts to be adopted by multiple states have been made but only partially successful. The two leading organizations are the American Law Institute (ALI) and the Uniform Law Commission (ULC), formerly known as the National Conference of Commissioners on Uniform State Laws (NCCUSL).

Uniform acts are proposed by private organizations like ULC to cover areas of law traditionally governed by the states where it would be useful to have a consistent set of rules across the various states. The most successful and influential uniform acts are the Uniform Commercial Code (a joint ALI-ULC project) and the Model Penal Code (from ALI).

However, uniform acts can only become the law of a state if they are actually enacted by the state legislature. Many uniform acts have never been taken up by state legislatures, or were successfully enacted in only a handful of states, or enacted in part, thereby limiting their uniformity function.

== Restatements ==
Upon its founding in 1923, ALI promptly launched its most ambitious and well-known enterprise: the creation of Restatements of the Law which are widely used by lawyers and judges throughout the United States to simplify the task of identifying and summarizing the current status of the common law. Instead of listing long, tedious citations of old cases that may not fit very well together (in order to invoke the long-established principles supposedly contained in those cases), or citing a treatise which may reflect the view of only one or two authors, they can simply cite a Restatement section (which is supposed to reflect the consensus of the American legal community) to refer to a particular common law principle.

The Restatements are often followed by state courts on issues of first impression in a particular state because they correctly state the current trend followed by most states on that issue. However, the Restatements are merely persuasive authority. This means that state courts (especially at the appellate level) can and have deviated from Restatement positions on a variety of issues.

== Civil law issues ==
Much of Louisiana law is derived from French and Spanish civil law, which stems from its history as a colony of both France and Spain. Puerto Rico, a former Spanish colony, is also a civil law jurisdiction of the United States. However, the criminal law of both jurisdictions has been necessarily modified by common law influences and the supremacy of the federal Constitution.

Furthermore, Puerto Rico is also unique in that it is the only U.S. jurisdiction in which the everyday working language of court proceedings, statutes, regulations, and case law is Spanish. All states, the federal government, and most territories use American English as their working language. Some states, such as California, do provide certain court forms in other languages (Chinese, Korean, Spanish, Vietnamese) for the convenience of immigrants and naturalized citizens. But American law as developed through statutes, regulations, and case law is always in English, attorneys are expected to take and pass the bar examination in English, judges hear oral argument, supervise trials, and issue orders from the bench in English, and testimony and documents originating in other languages are translated into English before being incorporated into the official record of a case.

Many states in the southwest that were originally Mexican territory have inherited several unique features from the civil law that governed when they were part of Mexico. These states include Arizona, California, Nevada, New Mexico, and Texas. For example, these states all have a community property system for the property of married persons (Idaho, Washington, and Wisconsin have also adopted community property systems, but they did not inherit them from a previous civil law system that governed the state). Another example of civil law influence in these states can be seen in the California Civil Code, where the law of contracts is treated as part of the law of obligations.

Many of the western states, including California, Colorado, New Mexico, Texas, and Wyoming use a system of allocating water rights known as the prior appropriation doctrine, which is derived from Spanish civil law. Each state has modified the doctrine to suit its own internal conditions and needs.

== See also ==
- List of U.S. state legal codes
- Uniform Act
- State constitution (United States)
- State legislature (United States)
