= Uniform Transfers to Minors Act =

Consistent tax law in all USA states

The Uniform Transfers To Minors Act (UTMA) is a uniform act drafted and recommended by the National Conference of Commissioners on Uniform State Laws in 1986, and subsequently enacted by all U.S. States, which provides a mechanism under which gifts can be made to a minor without requiring the presence of an appointed guardian for the minor, and which satisfies the Internal Revenue Service requirements for qualifying a gift of up to $17,000 for exclusion from the gift tax. It is a more flexible extension of the Uniform Gifts to Minors Act (UGMA), and allows the gifts to be real estate, inheritances, and other property.

The Act allows the donor of the gift to transfer title to a custodian who will manage and invest the property until the minor reaches a certain age. The age is generally 21, but is different in some states (usually 18 in those cases). In 2015 Florida passed a statute allowing the account to remain with the custodian until age 25 if desired. In the interim, the custodian can also make payments for the benefit of the minor out of the corpus of the gift.

The donor can serve as a custodian, rather than transferring the property to someone else to hold for the minor. However, the value of custodianship property is included in a donor’s gross estate if the donor dies while serving as the custodian.
