= Uniform Arbitration Act =

The Uniform Arbitration Act was a United States act from 1955 which specified arbitration in the United States law. It was created by the National Conference of Commissioners on Uniform State Laws. The law is currently preempted in almost all contexts by the 1925 FAA.

The act was drafted as a model arbitration statute to allow each U.S. state to adopt a uniform law of arbitration, instead of having each state enact a unique arbitration statute. The act was updated by the Uniform Law Commission in the year 2000. The new act, called the "Revised Uniform Arbitration Act" has been adopted by eighteen states. Thirty-five states have adopted some version of the Uniform Arbitration Act.
