= Model Nonprofit Corporation Act =

The Model Nonprofit Corporation Act (MNCA) is a model act prepared by the Nonprofit Organizations Committee of the Business Law Section of the American Bar Association. The MNCA is a model set of statutes governing nonprofit corporations proposed for adoption by state legislatures.

Many of the default procedures of the MNCA are different from standard parliamentary procedure, though they may be superseded by a provision either in the articles of incorporation or in the bylaws of the corporation.

37 out of the 50 states have adopted a version of the MNCA. Seven of these states have adopted the law entirely: Arkansas, Indiana, Mississippi, Montana, South Carolina, Tennessee and Washington. As far as the states that have not adopted the MNCA, they follow for-profit business law for the state.

== History ==
The 1952 MNCA was published as a companion to the Model Business Corporation Act prepared by the Committee on Corporate Laws of the Section of Corporation, Banking, and Business Law of the American Bar Association. The original 1952 version of the model act was designed to "follow the Model Business Corporation Act as closely as the subject matter permits." The MNCA has since been revised three times, most recently with the fourth edition, which was approved in 2021 and published in 2022.

History of Revisions of the Model Nonprofit Corporation Act
Date Approved	Date Published	Dates Amended	Title	Edition	Publisher	Originating Organization
1952	1952	1957, 1964	The Model Nonprofit Corporation Act		Twentieth Century Press	Committee on Corporate Laws of the Section of Corporation, Banking, and Business Law of the American Bar Association
1987	1988		Revised Model Nonprofit Corporation Act	Revised	Prentiss Hall Law and Business	Committee on Nonprofit Corporations of the Business Law Section of the American Bar Association
2008	2009		Model Nonprofit Corporation Act	Third Edition	ABA Section of Business Law	Committee on Nonprofit Organizations of the ABA Section of Business Law
2021	2022		Model Nonprofit Corporation Act	Fourth Edition	American Bar Association, Business Law Section	Nonprofit Organizations Committee of the Business Law Section of the American Bar Association
