= Uniform Common Interest Ownership Act =

The Uniform Common Interest Ownership Act was created to provide a model set of laws to govern condominium, cooperative, homeowner association and planned unit development communities in the United States. Variations of the act have been adopted in Colorado, Washington (state), and some other states.
