= Uniform Interstate Family Support Act =

The Uniform Interstate Family Support Act (UIFSA) is one of the uniform acts drafted by the National Conference of Commissioners on Uniform State Laws in the United States. First developed in 1992 the NCCUSL revised the act in 1996 and again in 2001 with additional amendments in 2008. The act limits the jurisdiction that can properly establish and modify child support orders and addresses the enforcement of child support obligations within the United States.

In 1996, Congress passed and President Bill Clinton signed the Personal Responsibility and Work Opportunity Act (42 U.S.C. § 666), which required that states adopt UIFSA by January 1, 1998 or face loss of federal funding for child support enforcement. Every U.S. state has adopted either the 1996 or a later version of UIFSA.

Whenever more than one state is involved in the establishing, enforcing or modifying a child or spousal support order, the act is implemented to determine the jurisdiction and power of the courts in the different states. The Act also establishes which state's law will be applied in proceedings under the Act, an important factor as support laws vary greatly among the states.

The Act establishes rules requiring every state to defer to child support orders entered by the state courts of the child's home state. The place where the order was originally entered holds continuing exclusive jurisdiction (CEJ), and only the law of that state can be applied to requests to modify the order of child support, unless the courts of that state no longer have original tribunal jurisdiction (CEJ) under the Act.

The Act also provides various direct interstate enforcement mechanisms. For example, it allows a caretaker parent to have an order mailed to the employer of the obligated parent, which will require that employer to withhold pay for the benefit of the child. Furthermore, it allows the caretaker parent to have an order mailed to an out-of-state court to get the other state to enforce the order.
