= Uniform Controlled Substances Act =

The Uniform Controlled Substances Act was drafted by the United States Department of Justice in 1969 and promulgated in 1970 by the National Conference of Commissioners on Uniform State Laws while the federal Controlled Substances Act was being drafted. Modeled after the federal Act, the uniform act established a drug scheduling system. There are three versions: the original 1970 version and two revisions, 1990 and 1994. The versions while different, are similar in many of their provisions. The acts of the adopting jurisdictions will, therefore, generally contain many provisions common to all of those versions. Thus, it is often difficult to say with certitude that a jurisdiction has adopted one version of the act rather than another. Nevertheless, every state other than Vermont and New Hampshire has adopted some version of the uniform act. Rufus B. King, counsel to United States Congress committees, notes that "it is provided that the state authorities must designate, reschedule, or delete substances whenever notified of such federal action unless they invoke an elaborate notice-and-hearing procedure to resist the federal ruling". Thus, the Uniform Act completes a top-down system of control in which drug policy originates through the international legislative process of treatymaking and United Nations Commission on Narcotic Drugs scheduling decisions and is automatically implemented through Controlled Substances Act provisions requiring federal scheduling of internationally controlled drugs, and Uniform Controlled Substances Act provisions requiring state scheduling of federally controlled drugs.

== See also ==
- Harry J. Anslinger - Active participant in policy
- Marihuana Tax Act of 1937 which did not make cannabis illegal, only enacted legislation as legal means of ban
