= Model Business Corporation Act =

Model act on corporate policy in the US

The Model Business Corporation Act (MBCA) is a model act promulgated and periodically amended by the Corporate Laws Committee of the Business Law Section of the American Bar Association ("Committee"). The MBCA has been adopted by 36 states and other jurisdictions. The MBCA provides a modern body of statutory corporate law that is regularly updated by the Committee based on judicial decisions, recent legislative enactments, and other legal and technological developments. It is a statute for business (stock) corporations that covers a number of areas, including formation, governance and director conduct and liability. The MBCA has been influential in shaping standards for United States corporate law.

== History ==
In 1928, the Uniform Law Commission promulgated a Uniform Business Corporation Act, which was subsequently adopted by three states, Louisiana, Washington and Kentucky, and partially adopted by a fourth, Idaho. Although uniform state legislation offers benefits in certain areas, such as interstate commerce, i.e. the Uniform Commercial Code, these benefits are less significant in corporation law where the "internal affairs" of a corporation are generally governed by the laws of its state of incorporation. As result of the resistance to the concept of a uniform corporation law, the Uniform Business Corporation Act was withdrawn as a "uniform" act in 1943 and renamed “A Model or State Business Corporation Act”. As a “model" act it was intended to provide states with the opportunity depart from the model in ways that would recognize special local considerations and would allow experimentation with different approaches to the issues, as opposed to the concept of a "uniform" law.

The Committee undertook to review and suggest revisions to the Model Business Corporation Act with the goal of producing a model in a simple style, with direct language that would set a pattern which states could follow, not uniformly, but as a style book and a suggestion of content. In 1950, the Committee promulgated its own Model Business Corporation Act. The Uniform Business Corporation Act was withdrawn by the Uniform Laws Commissioners in 1958. After that, the Committee continued to review and periodically revise the MBCA, and, in 1984, it published a complete revision. Since 1984, the Committee has continued to review and periodically revise various provisions of the MBCA. The 1984 version has been amended on numerous occasions since it was adopted by the Committee and was significantly revised in 2016 as part of the Committee’s ongoing efforts to keep it current and relevant. It has been amended regularly since then.

== Jurisdictions that have adopted the MBCA ==
The MBCA has been adopted in the following 36 jurisdictions: Alabama (2016 Revision), Alaska (1969 version), Arizona, Arkansas, Colorado, Connecticut, District of Columbia, Florida (2016 Revision), Georgia, Guam, Hawaii, Idaho (2016 Revision), Indiana, Iowa (2016 Revision), Kentucky, Louisiana, Maine, Massachusetts, Mississippi, Montana (2016 Revision), Nebraska, New Hampshire, New Mexico (1969 version), North Carolina, Oregon, Rhode Island, South Carolina, South Dakota, Tennessee, Utah, Vermont, Virginia (2016 Revision), Washington, West Virginia, Wisconsin and Wyoming. Currently, most MBCA jurisdictions have statutes based upon the 1984 revision of the MBCA, with varying levels of subsequent amendments; the other jurisdictions have statutes based on either the recent 2016 Revision or the 1969 version, as noted in the parentheses.

== 2016 Revision ==
The Committee adopted a major revision in 2016. The following are key features of the current MBCA, with emphasis on changes made since the 2016 Revision.

- Benefit Corporations. In 2019, the Committee added a new chapter 17 on benefit corporations, which allows shareholders to opt into a legal structure that expressly expands the purpose of the corporation beyond acting primarily in the financial interests of the shareholders.
- Virtual Shareholders’ Meetings Solely by Remote Participation. In 2020, the Committee adopted amendments to chapters 7 and 10 permitting the conduct of shareholders’ meetings solely by means of remote participation.
- Electronic Notices. In 2021, the Committee revised sections 1.41 and 16.01 of the MBCA to allow a corporation to provide notices to an email address provided to the corporation by a shareholder, even if the shareholder has not formally consented to receiving notices by email as had previously been required.
- Forum Selection Bylaws. The current MBCA permits the articles of incorporation or the bylaws of a corporation to specify the forum or forums for litigation involving internal corporate affairs.
- Venue for Judicial Proceedings. Recognizing that many states have developed specialized “business courts” that may be more appropriate venues for business litigation, the current MBCA enables the legislature to identify in its version of the MBCA the venue for such disputes in the court believed to be best suited to handle this type of cases.
- UBOC Compatibility. Much of the Current MBCA was designed to make the MBCA more compatible with the Uniform Business Organizations Code (UBOC), including the META, which was promulgated by the Uniform Law Commission and has been adopted by two jurisdictions, both of which are MBCA jurisdictions.
- Ratification of Defective Corporation Actions. The current MBCA permits the ratification of defective corporate actions, including actions in connection with the issuance of shares, many of which may have been void and incurable under common law. of directors and officers to present a business opportunity to the corporation, a provision favored by private equity investors. It also provides a safe harbor procedure for directors and officers dealing with opportunities that may be “corporate opportunities.”
- Elimination of Separate Treatment for Public Corporations. The current MBCA eliminates the previous statutory distinction between publicly held and privately held corporations, which makes the current MBCA more useful for small and medium-sized businesses.
- Modernization and Clarification of the 2016 Revision. The current MBCA contains a number of other modernizing changes, including clarification of the scope and operation of qualifications for nomination and election of directors, and the operation of quorum and voting requirements applicable to the board of directors.

== See also ==
- US corporate law
- Delaware General Corporation Law
- Securities and Exchange Act
- UK company law
