= Uniform Gifts to Minors Act =

American (state) laws with tax advantages

The Uniform Gifts to Minors Act (UGMA) is an act in some states of the United States that allows assets such as securities, where the donor has given up all possession and control, to be held in the custodian's name for the benefit of the minor without an attorney needing to set up a special trust fund. This allows a minor in the United States to have property set aside for the minor's benefit and may achieve some income tax benefit for the child's parents. Once the child reaches the age of maturity (18 or 21 depending on the state), the assets become the property of the child and the child can use them for any purpose. Contributing money to an UGMA account on another person's behalf could be subject to gift tax; however, the Internal Revenue Code of the United States allows persons to give up to the annual gift tax exclusion to another person without any gift tax consequences, and gifts exceeding that amount as long as total gifts are below the lifetime limits.

In the majority of states that have adopted the Uniform Transfers to Minors Act (UTMA), the assets are treated similarly. The assets are held in the custodian's name until the child reaches age of maturity. States that adopted UTMA also repealed UGMA; UTMA specifically provides that contracts in UTMA states which reference UGMA are governed by UTMA. Thus, UGMA is often still referred to in contracts designed for use in multiple states, even though it may actually mean UTMA in a particular state. Under the UGMA or UTMA, the ownership of the funds works like it does with any other trust and the donor must appoint a custodian (the trustee) to look after the account for the benefit of the beneficiary.

Until 1986, a UGMA or UTMA account allowed the assets to be taxed at the minor's income tax bracket. Tax law changes in 1986, 2006, 2007 and 2017 known as the "kiddie tax" have substantially reduced the tax savings of UGMAs and UTMAs. Until 2018, for beneficiaries under 19 (under 24 if a student), the first $1,000 of unearned income was tax-free, the second $1,000 was taxed at the minor's rate (typically 15%), and the amount over $2,000 was taxed at the parent's rate. The current rule is that for beneficiaries under 19 (under 24 if a student), the first $1,050 of unearned income is tax-free, the second $1,050 is taxed at the minor's rate (typically 12%), and the amount over $2,100 is taxed at the ordinary and capital gains rates applicable to trusts and estates. UGMA and UTMA accounts can invest in the stock market.

One negative effect of UGMA or UTMA assets for minors who plan to attend college is that financial aid is typically reduced by 20-25% of the UGMA or UTMA balance. Some financial advisers therefore advise depleting the balance in these accounts, always for purposes benefiting the minor such as summer camp, books, computer and similar expenses, well before the minor begins the process of applying to college.
