= Uniform act =

Proposed U.S. state law

In the United States, a uniform act is a proposed state law drafted and approved by the Uniform Law Commission (ULC), also known as the National Conference of Commissioners on Uniform State Laws (NCCUSL).

Federalism in the United States traditionally limits the legislative authority of the federal government in favor of the states. Specifically, the Tenth Amendment of the United States Constitution states that "powers not delegated to the United States by the Constitution, nor prohibited by it to the States, are reserved to the States respectively, or to the people". Therefore, state governments are free to enact unique laws in any area beyond the purview of federal preemption. Under the doctrine of Erie Railroad Co. v. Tompkins (1938), federal courts cannot dictate law to states on pure issues of state common law (i.e., almost all of contract, tort, and family law). However, a variety of legal issues regularly transcend state lines, which makes a predictable and relatively uniform set of laws across states a desirable objective. "Uniform acts" are collaboratively written model laws intended to facilitate the enactment of identical or similar laws by the separate states. Such laws are distinct from interstate compacts.

== Drafting ==
The NCCUSL is a body of private and government lawyers, state and federal judges, and law professors who are typically appointed by state governors. It drafts laws on a variety of subjects and proposes them for enactment by each state, the District of Columbia, the U.S. Virgin Islands, and Puerto Rico. NCCUSL was established in 1892. The NCCUSL, while influential, does not have any direct legislative power itself; uniform acts become laws only to the extent they are enacted into law by state legislatures.

Among the most influential uniform acts are the Uniform Commercial Code, Uniform Probate Code, Uniform Trust Code, Uniform Partnership Act, Uniform Limited Liability Company Act, Uniform Transfers to Minors Act, Uniform Certification of Questions of Law Act, Uniform Enforcement of Foreign Judgments Act, Uniform Controlled Substances Act, Uniform Arbitration Act, Uniform Environmental Covenants Act, Uniform Conservation Easements Act, Uniform Management of Institutional Funds Act, Uniform Interstate Family Support Act, Uniform Child Custody Jurisdiction and Enforcement Act, and Uniform Anatomical Gift Act.

In total, there are more than 100 uniform acts, which the NCCUSL periodically updates. Recent examples include the Revised Uniform Anatomical Gift Act, Revised Uniform Arbitration Act, Revised Uniform Partnership Act, Revised Uniform Limited Liability Company Act, and the Uniform Prudent Management of Institutional Funds Act.

A state may adopt a uniform act as written by NCCUSL, or a state may adopt a modified version. Unless such changes are minor, they can seriously obstruct the purpose of uniform acts—legal harmonization. Therefore, persons doing business in different states must always still check local law to ensure that (1) a uniform act was enacted in the state that governs a particular legal issue, and (2) the local act actually conforms to the text promulgated by NCCUSL.

For example, in Payne v. Stalley (1995), a lawyer relied on the official text of the Uniform Probate Code and failed to check the relevant Florida statute. As a result, the lawyer missed a filing deadline on a multimillion-dollar claim. The court wrote, "[w]e cannot rewrite Florida probate law to accommodate a Michigan attorney more familiar with the Uniform Probate Code".

== U.S. Territory of Palmyra Island ==
Uniform acts enacted in Hawaii after statehood in 1959 do not apply in the federal Territory of Palmyra Island. Palmyra Island was in the former Territory of Hawaii but was excluded from the state, and the territorial statutes remain in force there unless superseded by subsequent federal laws or cases.

== Model law ==
Model act, also called a model law or a piece of model legislation, is a suggested example for a law, drafted centrally to be disseminated and suggested for enactment in multiple independent legislatures.

== See also ==
- List of Uniform Acts (United States)
- Model act
- Uniform Commercial Code
- State law
- UNIDROIT
