= Uniform Law Commission =

United States law organization

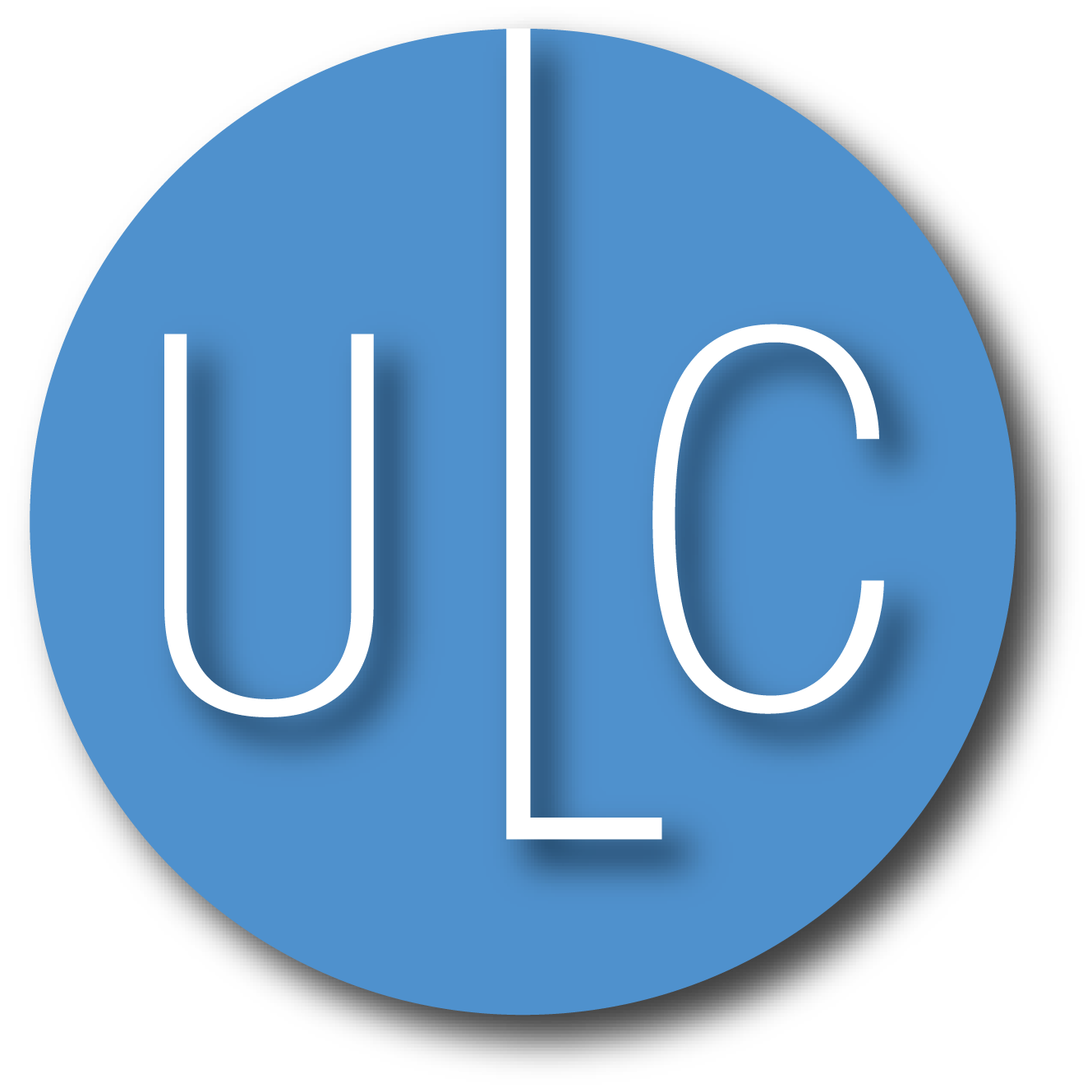
- Founded: 1892; 134 years ago
- Type: Cooperative association
- Headquarters: 111 North Wabash Avenue, Suite 1010, Chicago, Illinois
- Region served: United States
- Services: Draft uniform and model state legislation and produce research and reports on state statutory law.
- President: Lisa Jacobs
- Chair, Executive Committee: Steve Willborn
- Executive Director: Eric Weeks
- Website: uniformlaws.org

The Uniform Law Commission (ULC), also called the National Conference of Commissioners on Uniform State Laws, is a non-profit, American unincorporated association. Established in 1892, the ULC aims to provide U.S. states (plus the District of Columbia, Puerto Rico, and the U.S. Virgin Islands) with well-researched and drafted model acts to bring clarity and stability to critical areas of statutory law across jurisdictions. The ULC promotes enactment of uniform acts in areas of state law where uniformity is desirable and practical. The ULC headquarters are in Chicago, Illinois.

The ULC is best known for its work on the landmark Uniform Commercial Code (UCC), drafted in conjunction with the American Law Institute.

Since the ULC first convened in 1892, it has produced more than 450 uniform acts. These acts focus on commercial law, family and domestic relations law, estates, probate and trusts, real estate, alternate dispute resolution, and many other areas of the law. Among the ULC's most widely adopted acts are the Uniform Commercial Code, the Uniform Anatomical Gift Act, the Uniform Trade Secrets Act, the Uniform Child Custody Jurisdiction and Enforcement Act, the Uniform Interstate Family Support Act, the Uniform Electronic Transactions Act, the Uniform Transfers to Minors Act, and the Revised Uniform Fiduciary Access to Digital Assets Act.

== Commission ==
The ULC consists of approximately 350 commissioners, each appointed by the government of a U.S. state, the District of Columbia, Puerto Rico, or the U.S. Virgin Islands. Every ULC commissioner must be an attorney. Commissioners often concurrently serve as legislators, judges, or legal scholars.

Each jurisdiction determines the method of appointment and its number of commissioners. In most states, the governor appoints the state's commissioners to serve a specified term. In a few states, ULC commissioners serve at the will of the appointing authority and have no specific term. ULC commissioners are volunteers who do not receive salaries or other compensation for their public service.

The current ULC president is Lisa Jacobs of Philadelphia, Pennsylvania, the chair of the ULC's executive committee is Steven Willborn of Lincoln, Nebraska, and the chair of the Scope and Program Committee is William Barrett of Indianapolis, Indiana. Tim Berg of Phoenix, Arizona is the immediate past president.

== History ==
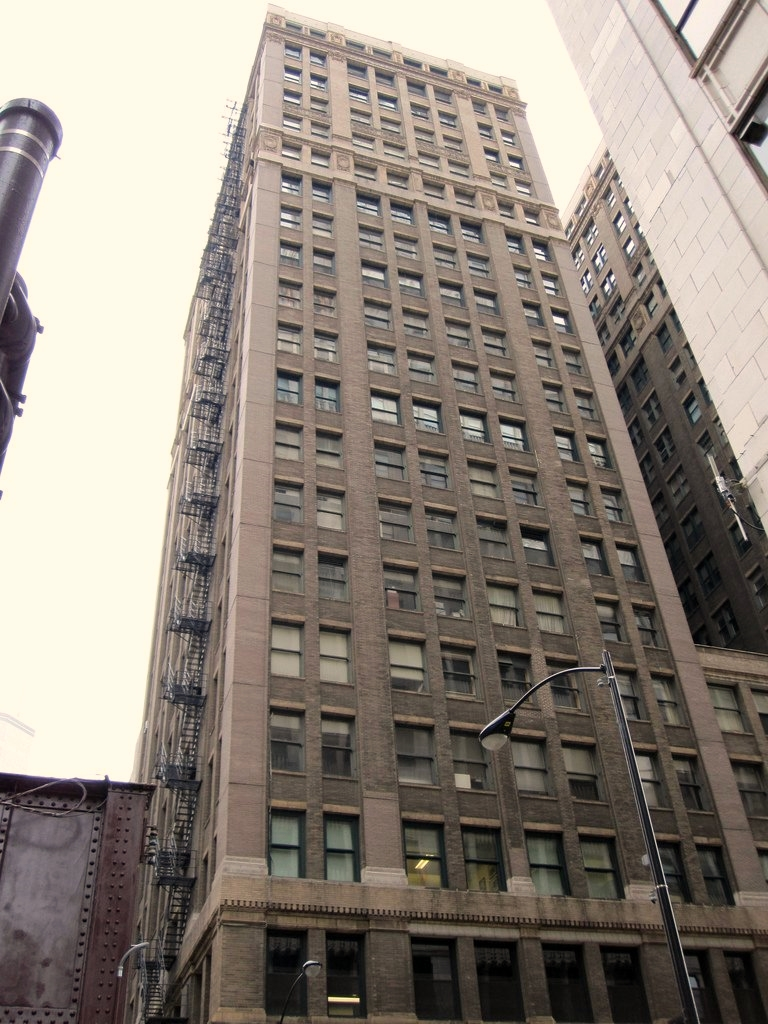
ULC headquarters, Chicago

The uniform law movement began in the latter half of the 19th century. The Alabama State Bar Association recognized as early as 1881 that wide variations in law between separate states often created confusion. In 1889, the New York Bar Association appointed a special committee on uniformity of laws. In 1890 the New York Legislature authorized the then-Governor of New York, Roswell Flower, to appoint three commissioners "to examine certain subjects of national importance that seemed to show conflict among the laws of the several commonwealths, to ascertain the best means to effect an assimilation or uniformity in the laws of the states and territories, and especially whether it would be advisable for the State of New York to invite the other states of the Union to send representatives to a convention to draft uniform laws to be submitted for approval and adoption by the several states." The American Bar Association held its 12th Annual Meeting the same year and adopted a resolution recommending each state provide for commissioners to confer with the commissioners of other states on the uniformity of legislation on certain subjects.

In August 1892, the first session of the organization that became the Uniform Law Commission was held at the Grand Union Hotel in Saratoga Springs, New York. The gathering took place before the annual summer meeting of the American Bar Association, a tradition that continues. The gathering brought together delegates from seven states: Delaware, Georgia, Massachusetts, Michigan, New Jersey, New York, and Pennsylvania. They titled themselves the "Conference of the State Boards of Commissioners on Promoting Uniformity of Law in the U.S." By 1912, every state was participating in the Commission. The United States Virgin Islands was the last jurisdiction to join, appointing its first commissioner in 1988.

In each year of service, the ULC has steadily increased its contribution to state and territorial law. In 1901, Woodrow Wilson became a member. Several commissioners later became Justices of the Supreme Court of the United States: Louis Brandeis, Wiley Blount Rutledge, and William H. Rehnquist. Several noted legal scholars have also been members, e.g. John Wigmore, Samuel Williston, Roscoe Pound, and John Bogart.

In 1940, the ULC moved to dispel confusion in U.S. commercial law with a comprehensive solution. This project led the ULC to partner with the American Law Institute to create the Uniform Commercial Code (UCC). The Code took ten years to complete. After another 14 years, it had been enacted in every state. It remains the signature product of the Commission.

Since its organization, the ULC has drafted more than 450 uniform laws on numerous subjects and in various fields of law, setting patterns for uniformity across the nation. Today, the Commission is recognized primarily for its work in commercial law, family law, real property law, the law of probate and estates, the law of business organizations, health law, and conflicts of law; it rarely drafts regulatory law. Uniform acts include the Uniform Collaborative Law Act, Uniform Probate Code, the Uniform Child Custody Jurisdiction Act, the Uniform Partnership Act, the Uniform Anatomical Gift Act, the Uniform Limited Partnership Act, and the Uniform Interstate Family Support Act.

The ULC has also experienced its share of spectacular failures. In the 1970s, the ULC dedicated an enormous amount of time and effort to the cause of comprehensive reform of U.S. real property law, which then and now varies dramatically from one state to the next. The ULC's generous and well-intended efforts were utterly futile; most of its Uniform Acts on the subject were never enacted in any state, and only bits and pieces were enacted in a handful of states. However, the Uniform Partition of Heirs Property Act (UPHPA), which addresses one of the most pernicious causes of land and single-family home loss in low-income communities, has been enacted in 27 states as of 2026, and the Farm Bill passed in 2018 changed the law such that farmers in states that enact the UPHPA have increased access to federal loans and federally funded legal assistance.

The ULC is called both the Uniform Law Commission and the National Conference of Commissioners on Uniform State Laws (still the legal name as of 2022); the acronym "NCCUSL" was also formerly often used, but the organization itself now uses the acronym "ULC" instead.

== Procedure for drafting and promulgating proposed uniform laws ==
"It must be emphasized that the [ULC] can only propose—no uniform law is effective until a state legislature adopts it." Frequently, a state will make substantial variations when adopting a uniform act.

Proposals for a new uniform act or model act are considered by the Committee on Scope and Program, which welcomes suggestions from the organized bar, state government entities, private interest groups, uniform law commissioners and private individuals. It may assign a suggested topic to a study committee, which reviews and researches the proposal and reports back to the Scope and Program Committee. Scope and Program sends its recommendations to the executive committee. If a recommendation to create or amend an act is approved, a Drafting Committee is selected and a reporter/drafter – an expert in the field – is hired. Advisors and participating observers are solicited to assist every drafting committee.

Draft acts are submitted for initial debate of the entire commission at the ULC's annual meeting. Each act must be considered section by section at no less than two annual meetings by all commissioners sitting as a committee of the whole. The commissioners may offer amendments and corrections to the proposed act.

Once the Committee of the Whole approves an act, it is presented for a vote by the states. Each of the 53 state and territory delegations caucuses its members and casts one vote. The proposed act must be approved (1) by no fewer than 20 jurisdictions; and, (2) by a majority of the states and territories present before it is officially approved as a uniform or model act.

At this point, the act is officially promulgated for consideration by the states and territories. Legislatures are urged to adopt uniform acts exactly as written to "promote uniformity in the law among the jurisdictions adopting the act." Model acts are designed to serve as a guideline for legislation that states and territories can borrow from or adapt to suit their individual needs and conditions.

Once an act is adopted by the ULC, it is usually presented to the House of Delegates of the American Bar Association for its endorsement. Upon its endorsement, the ULC Legislative Council advocates adoption of the act in the various states and territories.

The work of the ULC simplifies the legal life of businesses and individuals by providing rules and procedures that are consistent from jurisdiction to jurisdiction. Representing both state and territorial government and the legal profession, it has sought to bring uniformity to the divergent legal traditions of 53 sovereign jurisdictions, and has done so with significant success.

== Financial support ==
The major portion of the ULC's financial support comes from state and territorial government appropriations. Expenses are apportioned among the member jurisdictions by means of an annual assessment based on population. The ULC budget is supplemented by publishing royalties and by grants to support specific projects from foundations or the federal government.

The ULC's minimal budget is sufficient because most of its legal expertise is donated by the commissioners. Commissioners devote thousands of hours—amounting in some cases to millions of dollars' worth of time—to the development of uniform and model acts.

== Notable U.S. Uniform Law Commissioners ==
- Louis Brandeis, Associate Justice of the Supreme Court of the United States
- Alfred M. Cohen, member of the Ohio Senate
- John W. Davis, Solicitor General, Ambassador to the United Kingdom, Democratic 1924 presidential election nominee
- Robinson O. Everett, prominent attorney, jurist, and law professor
- Ernst Freund, law professor
- Alberto R. Gonzales, United States Attorney General
- Anne Gorsuch, Administrator of the Environmental Protection Agency
- Judd Gregg, United States Senator
- Melissa Hortman, 61st Speaker of the Minnesota House of Representatives from 2019 to 2025
- Albert E. Jenner Jr., prominent Chicago attorney with the firm of Jenner & Block
- James M. Landis, Chairman of the Securities and Exchange Commission and the Civil Aeronautics Board
- John H. Langbein, law professor
- Karl N. Llewellyn, American jurist and Chief Reporter for the Uniform Commercial Code
- James C. Nance, Speaker of the Oklahoma House of Representatives, President pro tempore of the Oklahoma Senate
- Theodore B. Olson, Solicitor General of the United States
- Roscoe Pound, law professor
- Dixon W. Prentice, Associate Justice of the Indiana Supreme Court
- William H. Rehnquist, Chief Justice of the United States
- Wiley Blount Rutledge, Associate Justice of the Supreme Court of the United States
- John G. Sargent, United States Attorney General
- David H. Souter, Associate Justice of the Supreme Court of the United States
- Robert Stein (academic), law professor, executive director and chief operating officer of the American Bar Association
- Martha Lee Walters, prominent attorney and Chief Justice of the Oregon Supreme Court
- Caspar W. Weinberger, secretary of defense
- John Wigmore, law professor
- Samuel Williston, law professor
- Jack L. Wilson, judge
- Woodrow Wilson, President of the United States

== See also ==
- American Legislative Exchange Council
- List of Uniform Acts (United States)
- National Conference of State Legislatures
- State Innovation Exchange
