= High Court of Singapore =

Lower division of national supreme court

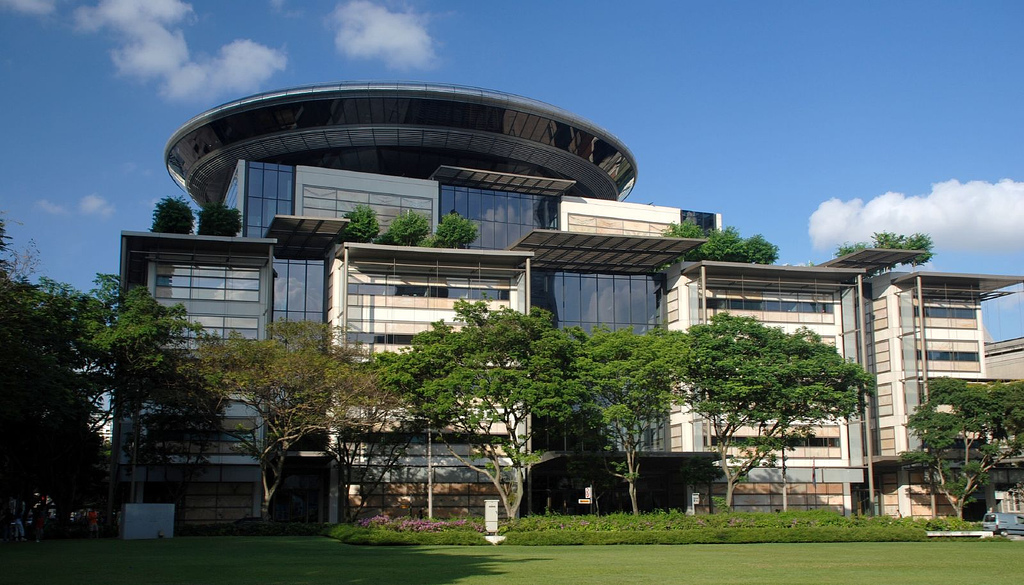
- The new Supreme Court Building was opened in 2005, designed by Norman Foster
- Interactive map of High Court of Singapore
- Established: 9 January 1970; 56 years ago
- Composition method: Executive selection
- Authorised by: Constitution of Singapore
- Judge term length: Tenure until the age of 65, but may be re-appointed
- Website: https://www.judiciary.gov.sg

Chief Justice of Singapore
- Currently: Sundaresh Menon
- Since: 6 November 2012

The High Court of Singapore (SGHC) is the lower division of the Supreme Court of Singapore, the upper division being the Court of Appeal. The High Court consists of the chief justice and the judges of the High Court. Judicial Commissioners are often appointed to assist with the Court's caseload. There are two specialist commercial courts, the Admiralty Court and the Intellectual Property Court, and a number of judges are designated to hear arbitration-related matters and insolvency matters respectively. In 2014 the Family Division of the High Court was created, and in 2015 the Singapore International Commercial Court ("SICC") was established as a division of the High Court. The current divisions of the High Court are the General Division and the Appellate Division. The seat of the High Court is the Supreme Court Building.

Under changes in 2021 made due to the increasing volume and complexity of civil appeals, the High Court was in effect sub-divided into two divisions, the General Division and the Appellate Division. The General Division took over the former role and jurisdiction of the High Court (and thus the Family Division and the SICC became divisions of the General Division), while the Appellate Division was a new court formed to hear those civil appeals from the General Division which were not allocated to the Court of Appeal. Thus, some civil appeals from the General Division lie directly to the Court of Appeal based on the subject matter of the appeal, while all other civil appeals from the General Division lie to the Appellate Division. Appeals from the Appellate Division to the Court of Appeal are allowed only with permission of the Court of Appeal in cases which raise a point of law of public importance. The Appellate Division has no criminal jurisdiction. (In general, references below to the High Court now refer to the General Division).

The High Court exercises both original jurisdiction and appellate jurisdiction in civil and criminal matters. By possessing original jurisdiction, the Court is able to hear cases at first instance—it can deal with trials of matters coming before the courts for the first time. A special aspect of the Court's original jurisdiction is its judicial review jurisdiction, under which it determines the constitutionality of legislation and actions taken by the Government. The Court exercises its appellate jurisdiction when it hears appeals from trials originating in the Subordinate Courts such as District Courts and Magistrates' Courts. The Court also exercises supervisory and revisionary jurisdiction over subordinate courts. The exercise of judicial review of administrative acts carried out by public authorities to ensure that they comply with principles of administrative law is an aspect of the Court's supervisory jurisdiction.

Under the principles of stare decisis (judicial precedent), the High Court is bound by decisions of the Court of Appeal. In turn, decisions of the High Court must be followed by District Courts and Magistrates' Courts. On the other hand, a Judge of the High Court is not bound by previous decisions by other High Court judges. As a matter of comity, though, a Court will generally not depart from a previous decision unless there is a good reason to do so. If there are conflicting High Court decisions, it is up to the Court of Appeal to decide which decision is correct.

== History ==
In 1826, Singapore was united with Malacca and Prince of Wales' Island (present-day Penang) to form the Straits Settlements, which were granted a Court of Judicature by the Second Charter of Justice dated 27 November 1826. The Charter conferred on the Court the jurisdiction of the Courts of King's Bench, Chancery, Common Pleas and Exchequer in civil, criminal and revenue matters, among other things. The judges of the Court were the Governor, the Resident Counsellor, and the Recorder of Prince of Wales' Island, Singapore and Malacca. The Governor's power to overrule decisions of the Recorder led to dissatisfaction as the Recorder was the only member of the Court who was a professional judge, and there were calls for the executive and judicial branches to be separated. This issue was not resolved by the Third Charter of Justice granted to the Straits Settlements on 12 August 1855, though there were now to be two Recorders, one for Penang and the other for Singapore and Malacca. It was only in 1867 that the Governor and Resident Counsellors ceased to exercise judicial powers.

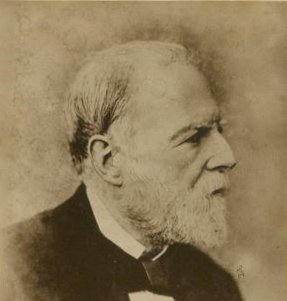
Sir Peter Benson Maxwell (1817–1893) was Recorder of Penang 1856–1866, Recorder of Singapore and Malacca 1866–1867, and finally Chief Justice of the Straits Settlements 1867–1871

The Court of Judicature of the Straits Settlements was abolished in 1868 and replaced by the Supreme Court of the Straits Settlements. The Supreme Court was reorganized in 1873 to consist of the Chief Justice, the Judge at Penang, and a Senior and Junior Puisne Judge. By this time Singapore had become the centre of government and trade in the Straits Settlements, so the Chief Justice and Senior Puisne Judge resided in Singapore, while the Judge of Penang and the Junior Puisne Judge were stationed in Penang. The Supreme Court was also given jurisdiction to sit as a Court of Appeal. As a result of legislation passed in 1885, the Supreme Court consisted of the Chief Justice and three puisne judges. The Court was significantly altered in 1907. It now had two divisions, one exercising original civil and criminal jurisdiction and the other appellate civil and criminal jurisdiction.

During the Japanese occupation of Singapore (1942–1945), all the courts that had operated under the British were replaced by new courts established by the Japanese Military Administration. The Syonan Koto-Hoin (Supreme Court) was formed on 29 May 1942; there was also a Court of Appeal, but it was never convened. Following the end of World War II, the courts that had existed before the war were restored and remained largely unchanged until Singapore's independence from the United Kingdom through merger with Malaysia in 1963. The judicial power of Malaysia was vested in a Federal Court, a High Court in Malaya, a High Court in Borneo (now the High Court in Sabah and Sarawak), and a High Court in Singapore. In 1965 Singapore left the Federation of Malaysia and became an independent republic. However, the High Court remained part of the Federal Court structure until 1969, when Singapore enacted the Supreme Court of Judicature Act to regularise the judicial system. Coming into force on 9 January 1970, the Act declared that the Supreme Court of Singapore now consisted of the Court of Appeal, the Court of Criminal Appeal and the High Court. The Judicial Committee of the Privy Council remained Singapore's highest appellate court until a permanent Court of Appeal for both civil and criminal appeals was established. Appeals to the Privy Council were completely abolished in 1994.

== Constitution of the Court ==
The Supreme Court of Singapore is the nation's superior court of record. It is superior in the sense that its jurisdiction to hear civil and criminal cases is unlimited compared to the Subordinate Courts of Singapore, and it hears appeals from lower courts. As a court of record, it keeps a perpetual record of its proceedings. The High Court is the lower division of the Supreme Court, the upper one being the Court of Appeal.

The High Court consists of the Chief Justice of Singapore and the Judges of the High Court. People qualified to be appointed a Judge must be qualified within the meaning of the Legal Profession Act for at least ten years. or a member of the Singapore Legal Service, or both. The Chief Justice and Judges of the High Court are appointed by the President of Singapore if he, acting in his discretion, concurs with the advice of the Prime Minister. Where the appointment of Judges is concerned, the Prime Minister is required to consult the Chief Justice before tendering advice to the President. In addition, to facilitate the disposal of business in the Supreme Court, the President may, if he concurs with the Prime Minister's advice, appoint people qualified to be judges to be Judicial Commissioners of the Supreme Court. Judicial Commissioners exercise the same powers and perform the same functions as Judges of the High Court. However, unlike Judges who generally hold office until the age of 65 years, Judicial Commissioners do not have security of tenure.

In general, all proceedings in the Court are heard and disposed of before a single judge. Whenever the business of the Court requires, a Judge of Appeal of the Court of Appeal may sit in the High Court and act as a High Court Judge. If the Court feels that it requires assistance in a particular case, it may summon persons of skill and experience in the matter to which the proceedings relate to sit with the Court and act as assessors.

The Chief Justice may give directions of a general or particular nature to distribute the business of the Court among his fellow Judges. In 2002, it was announced that specialist commercial courts would be set up in the Supreme Court to emphasize the judiciary's "commitment to transform Singapore into a premier international commercial dispute resolution centre in litigation, arbitration and mediation". The Admiralty Court was established in February 2002 to deal with admiralty law matters, followed in September by the Intellectual Property Court which is presided over by Judges and Judicial Commissioners with expertise in intellectual property law. In April 2003, Justice Judith Prakash was appointed to preside over all arbitration matters brought before the High Court; Justices Belinda Ang Saw Ean and V.K. Rajah were similarly appointed in November of the following year.

The High Court sits on every day of the year except Saturdays, Sundays and public holidays, although a Judge may lawfully sit on such days if directed to do so by the Chief Justice or if the Judge is of the opinion that the business to be dispatched is extremely urgent. The High Court sits at such times and at such places as the Chief Justice appoints from time to time. When the Supreme Court moved from the Old Supreme Court Building and City Hall Building at 1 and 3 Saint Andrew's Road respectively to the present Supreme Court Building at 1 Supreme Court Lane, the Chief Justice formally appointed the new building as a place where the High Court sits by way of a notification dated 20 June 2005.

== Jurisdiction ==
The High Court exercises both original jurisdiction and appellate jurisdiction in civil and criminal matters. By possessing original jurisdiction, the Court is able to hear cases at first instance; in other words, it can deal with trials of matters coming before the courts for the first time. In theory, the Court has unlimited original jurisdiction – it can hear any type of civil or criminal case, no matter how trivial or serious. However, in practice, parties may be penalised by having to pay higher costs (legal fees) if they choose to bring a civil case before the High Court when it is more appropriately dealt with by a subordinate court. For example, a Magistrate's Court may hear civil cases where the amount claimed does not exceed S$60,000. If a plaintiff commences an action in the High Court to recover a sum of money based on contract, tort or any written law, and the suit could have been filed in a Magistrate's Court, if the plaintiff eventually succeeds in recovering a sum that does not exceed $60,000, she is not entitled to receive any more costs – legal expenses payable to her by the defendant – than a Magistrate's Court would have ordered. Generally, except in probate matters, a civil case must be commenced in the High Court if the value of the claim exceeds S$250,000. Probate matters are commenced in the High Court only if the value of the deceased's estate exceeds $3 million, or if the case involves the resealing of a foreign grant of probate or letters of administration.

Written laws also specify that some criminal matters should be tried in the Subordinate Courts rather than in the High Court. A District Court, for instance, has jurisdiction to try all offences with a maximum term of imprisonment not exceeding ten years or punishable with a fine only, so trials of such offences are generally not held in before the High Court. The Court exercises its appellate jurisdiction when it hears appeals from trials originating in the Subordinate Courts.

The Court also exercises supervisory and revisionary jurisdiction over subordinate courts.

=== Original jurisdiction ===
==== Original civil jurisdiction ====
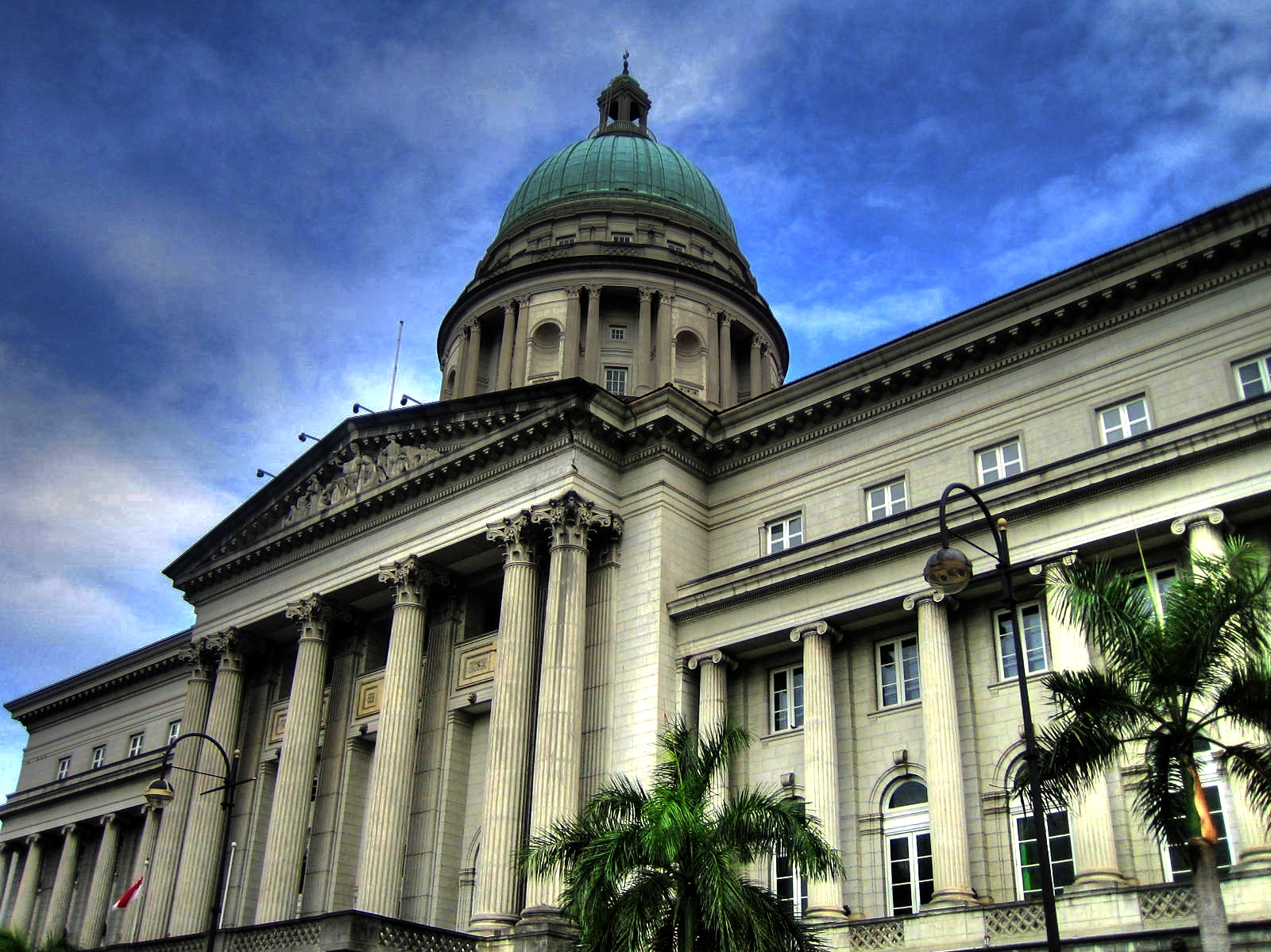
Up to 2005, the High Court operated together with the Court of Appeal in the Old Supreme Court Building (shown above) and City Hall on Saint Andrew's Road

The High Court has jurisdiction to hear and try any action in personam (that is, directed towards a particular person) where:

- the defendant is served with a document specifying the nature and particulars of the plaintiff's claim against him or her – either a writ of summons or some other originating process – in or outside Singapore; or
- the defendant submits himself or herself to the Court's jurisdiction.

In particular, the Court has jurisdiction:

- under any written law relating to divorce and matrimonial causes;
- under any written law relating to matters of admiralty;
- under any written law relating to bankruptcy or to companies;
- to appoint and control guardians of infants (minors) and generally over the persons and property of infants;
- to appoint and control guardians and keepers of the persons and estates of idiots, mentally disordered persons and persons of unsound mind; and
- jurisdiction to grant probates of wills and testaments, letters of administration of the estates of deceased persons and to alter or revoke such grants.

The Court exercises concurrent jurisdiction in certain matters with the Syariah Court of Singapore, which deals with cases involving Muslim matrimonial law. Provided that certain conditions are satisfied, the High Court has jurisdiction to hear and try any civil proceedings within the jurisdiction of the Syariah Court relating to maintenance for any wife or child, the custody of any child, and the disposition or division of property on divorce.

The Chief Justice may direct that the District Court to hear and determine certain types of proceedings when he thinks it is necessary or expedient to improve efficiency in the administration of justice and to provide for the speedier disposal of proceedings started in the High Court. In 1996 aspects of the High Court's jurisdiction to hear matrimonial cases were transferred to a dedicated Family Court, which is constituted as a District Court. As of December 2007, the Family Court hears proceedings relating to divorce, division of matrimonial assets and guardianship of children, including matters over which it has concurrent jurisdiction with the Syariah Court. However, contested applications for the division of matrimonial assets where the net value asserted by any party to the proceedings is of or above $1.5 million are transferred back to the High Court. Decisions made by the Family Court may be appealed to the High Court, but no further appeal may be brought to the Court of Appeal unless the Court of Appeal or a Judge of the High Court grants leave for such an appeal.

===== Civil trials =====
In most civil trials, plaintiffs begins the proceedings by making a speech opening the case. After the plaintiff has presented all the evidence, the defendant must decide whether or not to adduce evidence. If the defendant elects not to do so, the plaintiff may make a speech closing the case, and the defendant then proceeds to state their case. However, if the defendant elects to adduce evidence, the defendant opens their case, present the evidence, and make a speech to close the case. The plaintiff may then make a speech in reply. If any party raises a fresh point of law in a final speech or cites any authority not previously cited, the other party may make a further speech in reply to that point of law or authority.

If the burden of proof of all the issues in the action lies on the defendant, the defendant is entitled to begin instead of the plaintiff. The trial then proceeds with the plaintiff responding to the defendant's case, and so on.

==== Original criminal jurisdiction ====
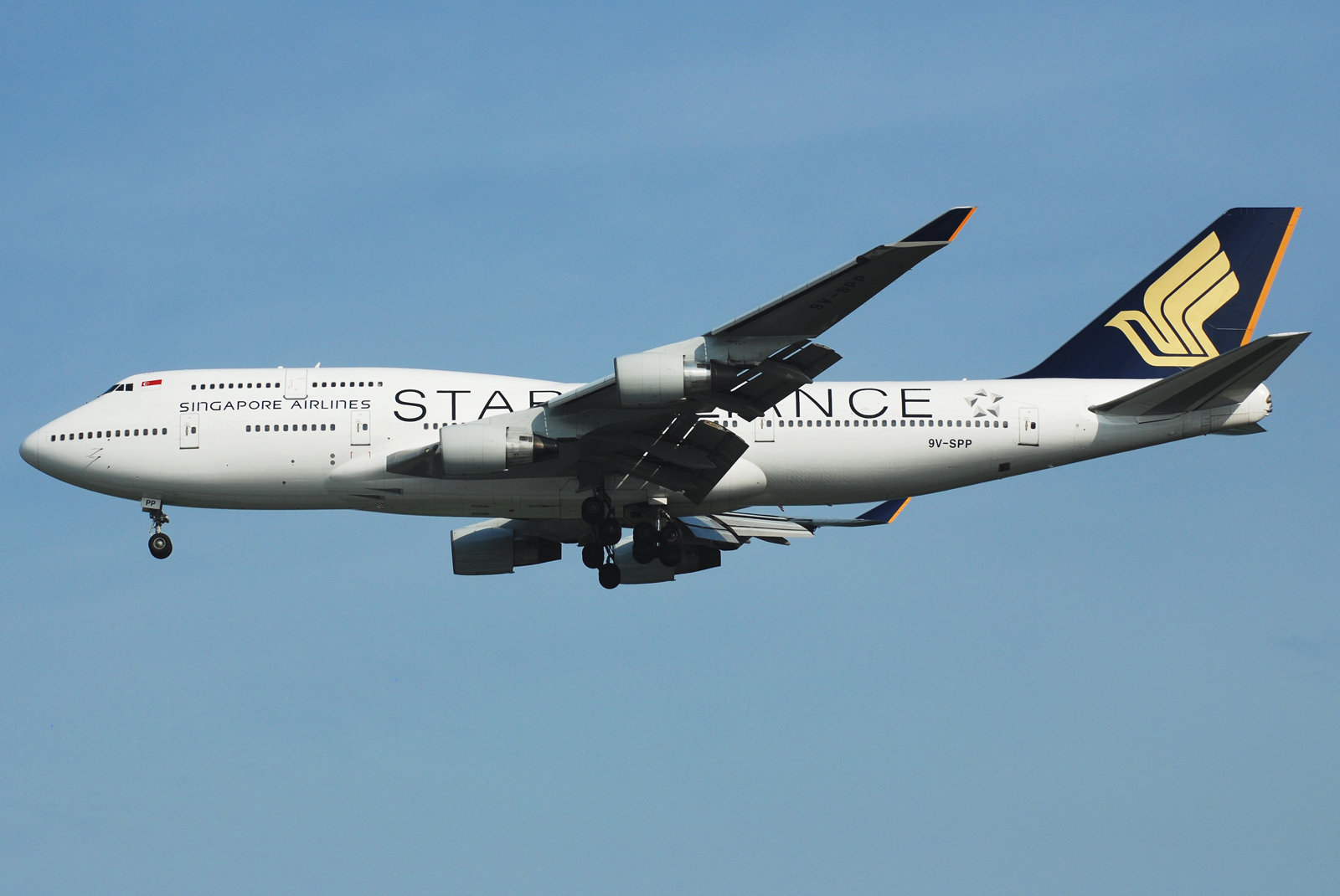
A Singapore Airlines 747-412 aeroplane landing at Singapore Changi Airport. Criminal offences committed on board aircraft registered in Singapore may be tried by the High Court.

The High Court has jurisdiction to try all offences committed:

- within Singapore;
- on board any ship or aircraft registered in Singapore;
- by any person who is a citizen of Singapore on the high seas or on any aircraft;
- by any person on the high seas where the offence is piracy by the law of nations;
- by any person within or outside Singapore where the offence is punishable under the Hijacking of Aircraft and Protection of Aircraft and International Airports Act or the Maritime Offences Act; and
- in any place or by any person if it is provided in any written law that the offence can be trailed in Singapore.

===== Committal hearings and transmission proceedings =====
Before an accused person is committed to trial in the High Court, a committal hearing must be held before an examining magistrate to determine if there is sufficient evidence for the accused to be put on trial. An accused may be committed for trial at once to plead guilty (except to an offence punishable by death), the facts of the case presented by the prosecution disclose sufficient grounds for committing the accused, and the magistrate is satisfied that the accused understands the nature of the charge against him or her and intends to admit without qualification the offence alleged against him or her.

In other cases, the examining magistrate must consider the evidence tendered by the prosecution and decide if there are sufficient grounds for committing the accused for trial. If there are insufficient grounds, the magistrate may discharge the accused. If there are peculiar difficulties or circumstances connected with the case, or if the magistrate is so directed by the Public Prosecutor, the magistrate must transmit the evidence before the court to the Public Prosecutor to provide instructions for the disposition of the matter. Otherwise, if the examining magistrate feels that the accused should be committed for trial in the High Court based on the prosecution's evidence, the charge tendered by the prosecution must be read and explained to the accused, and the magistrate must recite the following words or words to similar effect:

Having heard the evidence do you wish to say anything in answer to the charge? You have nothing to hope from any promise of favour and nothing to fear from any threat which may have been held out to you to induce you to make any confession of your guilt. You are not bound to say anything unless you desire to do so but whatever you say will be taken down in writing and may be given in evidence at your trial.

If the accused elects to reserve a defence (that is, the accused chooses not to respond to the charge at this stage), the magistrate must commit the accused for trial. If the accused elects to make a defence, this may be done by means of a written statement or an oral statement that is taken down in writing by the magistrate. After hearing the defence, the magistrate may either discharge the accused or commit the accused for trial.

For certain sexual offences, no committal hearing is required if the Public Prosecutor is of the opinion that there is sufficient evidence providing a foundation for a full and proper criminal trial. In such cases, the Public Prosecutor may by fiat designate that the case be tried in the High Court, or in a District Court or Magistrate's Court. On receiving a fiat, a magistrate must arrange for the charge against the accused person to be read and explained to him or her, and then transmit the case to the appropriate court for trial.

===== Criminal trials =====
All criminal trials before the High Court are heard and disposed of before a single Judge of the High Court. When the Court is ready to commence a trial, the accused appears or is brought before the court. The charge is read and explained, and the accused is asked whether they are guilty of the offence or claims to be tried. If the accused pleads guilty the plea is recorded, and may be convicted on it and sentenced. If the accused refuses to or does not plead, or claims trial, the Court proceeds to try the case.

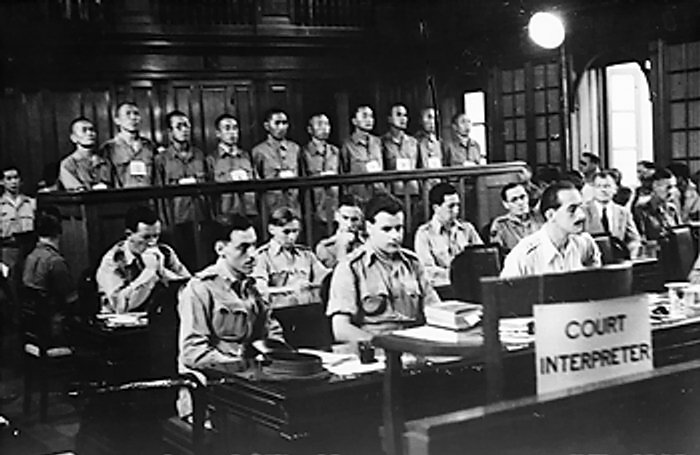
Imperial Japanese Army soldiers in the dock of a courtroom in the Old Supreme Court Building on 21 January 1946 during their trial for war crimes allegedly committed during the Japanese occupation of Singapore

Counsel for the Public Prosecutor opens the case by stating shortly the nature of the offence charged and the evidence by which the accused's guilt is proposed to be proved. The prosecution witnesses are then examined, cross-examined for the defence and, if necessary, re-examined by the prosecution. When the case for the prosecution is concluded, the defence may invite the Court to dismiss the case on the basis that there is no case to answer. The Court must decide whether there is evidence against the accused which is not inherently incredible and which satisfies every element of the charge against him or her. If there is no such evidence, the accused must be acquitted. If the Court finds that a case against the accused has been made out, it must call on the accused to give a defence. It is up to the accused to decide whether or not to offer a defence. The accused, or their advocate, may open the case for the defence, stating the facts or law on which the accused intends to rely and commenting on the evidence for the prosecution. The accused may then examine witnesses, and after their cross-examination by the prosecution and re-examination by the defence, may sum up the case. The prosecution may then call persons as witnesses or recall persons already examined for re-examination for rebuttal purposes, and such rebuttal witnesses may be cross-examined by the defence and re-examined by the prosecution. Whether or not the accused has adduced evidence, the prosecution has the right to reply on the whole case.

If the Court finds the accused not guilty, it records an order of acquittal. If it finds the accused guilty, it passes sentence on the accused according to law. The High Court is the sole court exercising original criminal jurisdiction that may impose the death penalty. Also, when a person is convicted of an offence punishable with imprisonment for two years or more and had previously been convicted in Singapore or elsewhere of a similar offence, the Court may, in addition to any other punishment, direct that he or she be subject to police supervision for not more than seven years starting immediately after the sentence passed for the last of these offences expires. In addition, only the High Court and District Courts are empowered to sentence convicted persons to corrective training, reformative training or preventive detention.

At any stage of a trial before the Court before the return of the verdict, the prosecution may inform the Court that it will not further prosecute the accused upon the charge. All proceedings on the charge against the accused are then stayed, and he or she is discharged. The prosecution may act in this manner for various reasons; for example, if it no longer believes that the accused committed the offence, if it feels that the case against the accused is weak, or if it is of the view that further investigations are required to gather evidence for its case. Unless the judge expressly directs otherwise, such a discharge does not amount to an acquittal. This means that if the prosecution is able to obtain additional evidence to bolster its case, it may bring criminal proceedings against the accused again at a later stage.

==== Judicial review jurisdiction ====
A special aspect of the High Court's original jurisdiction is its judicial review jurisdiction. This jurisdiction is implied rather than expressly stated in any statute. The Court exercises two types of judicial review: judicial review under the Constitution of Singapore, and judicial review of administrative acts. However, only the first type is an exercise of the Court's judicial review jurisdiction, as judicial review of administrative acts is regarded as falling within the Court's supervisory jurisdiction (see below).

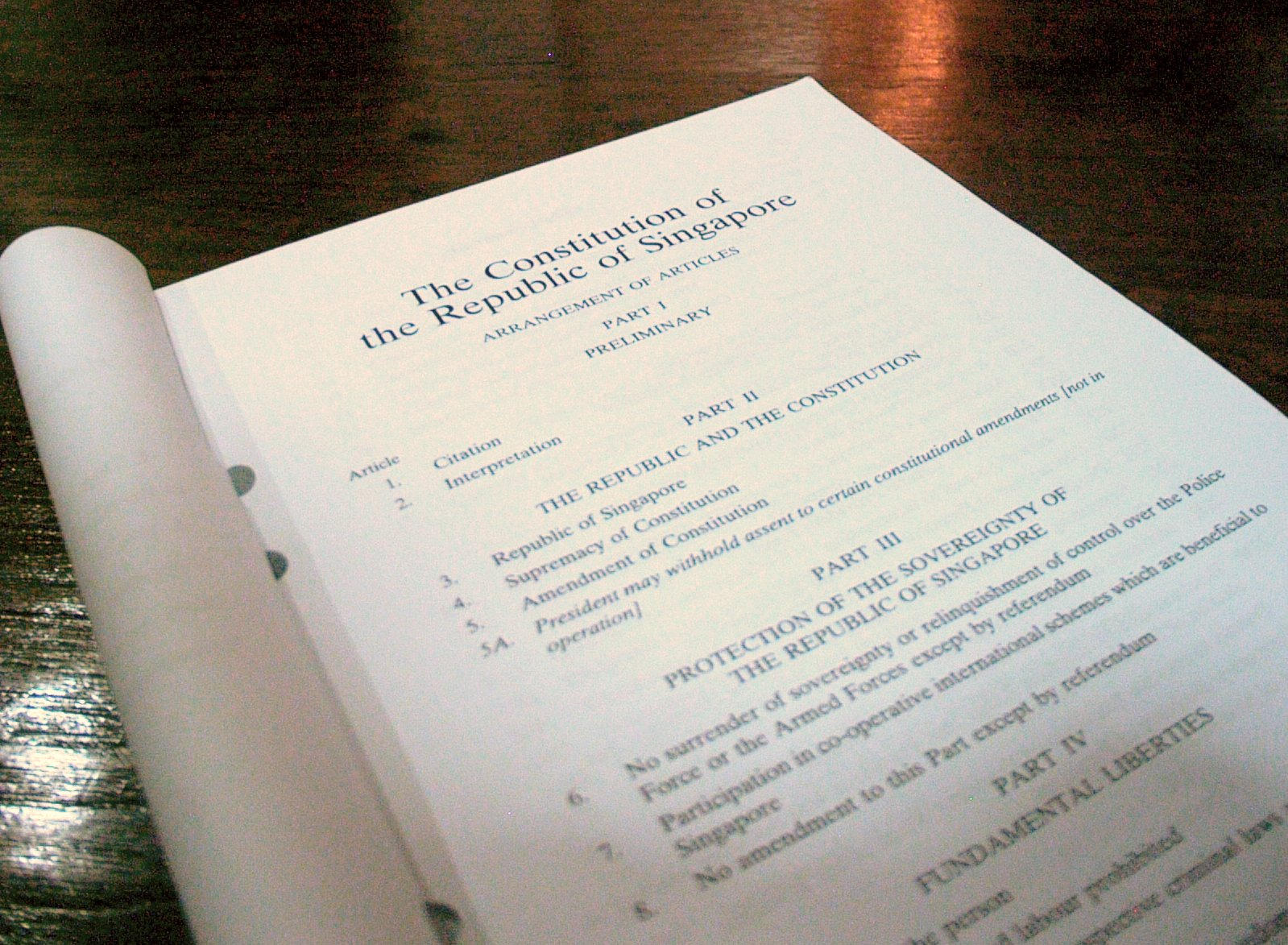
The 1999 Reprint of the Constitution of Singapore

The Constitution of Singapore is the supreme law of Singapore. Ordinary laws that were in force prior to the Constitution coming into force on 9 August 1965 continue to apply after the Constitution's commencement but must be construed with such modifications, adaptations, qualifications and exceptions as may be necessary to bring them into conformity with the Constitution. Any law enacted by the Legislature after the commencement of the Constitution which is inconsistent with the Constitution is void to the extent of the inconsistency. Thus, the Constitution reflects the principle established in the landmark decision of the Supreme Court of the United States, Marbury v. Madison (1803): since it is the role of the courts to interpret the law, they have power to decide whether ordinary laws are inconsistent with the Constitution and, if so, to declare such laws to be void. The Singapore High Court adopted a similar stance in its judgement in the 1994 case Chan Hiang Leng Colin v. Public Prosecutor:

The court has the power and duty to ensure that the provisions of the Constitution are observed. The court also has a duty to declare invalid any exercise of power, legislative and executive, which exceeds the limits of the power conferred by the Constitution, or which contravenes any prohibition which the Constitution provides.

In criminal proceedings, if a question of law arises as to the interpretation or effect of any provision of the Constitution, a party may apply to the trial court for a case to be stated on the legal question to a "relevant court" for its decision. Where the trial court is a subordinate court the relevant court is the High Court; and where the trial court is the High Court the relevant court is the Court of Appeal. The Public Prosecutor has a right to be heard at the hearing of the case stated. As there are no corresponding statutory provisions for civil proceedings, when constitutional issues arise in the course of such matters in a subordinate court, they will be dealt with by that court and may then be appealed to the High Court and possibly to the Court of Appeal in the usual manner. Alternatively, a party to the civil proceedings can start a separate action in the High Court for the constitutional issue to be determined.

==== Powers ====
The High Court exercises powers that are vested in it by written law. For example, it has the power to:

- order that evidence be preserved by seizure, detention, inspection, photographing, the taking of samples, the conduct of experiments or in any manner, both before and after proceedings are commenced;
- transfer any proceedings to any other court, or to or from any subordinate court; and
- order the medical examination of a person who is a party to any proceedings where his or her physical or mental condition is relevant to any matter in question in the proceedings.

The High Court may order that any criminal case be transferred from a subordinate criminal court to any other criminal court of equal or superior jurisdiction, or to the Court itself, whenever it appears to the Court that:

- a fair and impartial inquiry or trial cannot be had in any subordinate criminal court;
- some question of law of unusual difficulty is likely to arise; or
- an order is expedient for the ends of justice or is required by any provision of the Criminal Procedure Code or other written law.

=== Appellate jurisdiction ===
==== Appellate civil jurisdiction ====
When exercising appellate jurisdiction in civil cases, the High Court hears appeals from District Courts, Magistrates' Courts and other tribunals. The permission of the High Court, a District Court or Magistrate's Court is needed for an appeal from a District Court or Magistrate's Court case where the amount in dispute or the value of the subject-matter does not exceed $50,000. Such appeals are usually heard by a single judge, although if the judge thinks fit the appeal may be fixed before a court of three judges. In such cases, the appeal is decided according to the opinion of the majority of the judges. If the Court is of the view that the trial judge's decision was correct, it will dismiss the appeal and uphold the decision below. Otherwise, the appeal is allowed and the trial judge's decision is overturned.

Appeals are by way of rehearing; in other words, the High Court is entitled to consider the case afresh and is not bound in any way by the decision made by the court below. However, during an appeal, witnesses do not appear before the Court again to repeat their testimony. Instead, the Court refers to the notes taken by the judge who presided at the trial at first instance, or the full transcript of the proceedings if this is available. It also listens to legal arguments advanced by the parties' lawyers. During an appeal, the Court has the same powers as the Court of Appeal has when it hears appeals from the High Court.

==== Appellate criminal jurisdiction ====
The High Court hears appeals from criminal cases originating in the District Courts and Magistrates' Courts. These inferior courts can also reserve points of law arising in criminal cases to be decided by the High Court.

In general, a person convicted by a District Court or Magistrate's Court may appeal against the conviction, sentence or both. However, if the person has pleaded guilty, the appeal may only be as to the extent or legality of the sentence. The Public Prosecutor is entitled to appeal against a person's acquittal.

The High Court will not reverse or set aside a judgement, sentence or order of a subordinate court unless it is shown to its satisfaction that the judgement, acquittal, sentence or order was either wrong in law or against the weight of the evidence, or, in the case of a sentence, manifestly excessive or inadequate in the circumstances of the case. If there is no sufficient ground for interfering, the Court will dismiss the appeal. Otherwise, the Court may make the following orders:

- in an appeal from an acquittal, it may reverse the order and direct that further inquiry be made or that the accused should be retried or committed for trial, or find him guilty and pass sentence on him or her according to law;
- in an appeal from a conviction, it may:
  - reverse the finding and sentence and acquit or discharge the accused or order him or her to be retried or committed for trial;
  - alter the finding, maintaining the sentence; or, with or without altering the finding, reduce or enhance the sentence; or
  - with or without the reduction or enhancement and with or without altering the finding, alter the nature of the sentence;
- in an appeal as to sentence, reduce or enhance the sentence, or alter the nature of the sentence; or
- in an appeal from any other order, alter or reverse the order.

A District Court or Magistrate's Court may, within ten days from the time of any judgement, sentence or order passed or made, state a case on any question of law arising in the proceedings for the High Court's consideration any question of law arising in the proceedings either with or without a written application from a party to the proceedings. A subordinate court may refuse to state a case for the High Court if it is of the opinion that the application for it is frivolous, except if the application is made by the Public Prosecutor. If a subordinate court refuses to state a case, an applicant may apply to the High Court for an order to compel the subordinate court to do so. The High Court hears and determines the questions of law arising on cases stated, then either affirms, amends or reverses the subordinate court's decision on the matter, or makes any other order that it sees fit.

=== Supervisory and revisionary jurisdiction ===
==== Supervisory jurisdiction ====
The High Court has general supervisory and revisionary jurisdiction over all subordinate courts. If the interests of justice appear to require it, the Court may, either of its own motion or if requested by any interested person, call for the records of any matter or proceeding in a subordinate court, whether civil or criminal, at any stage. It may then order that the matter be transferred to the High Court or give the subordinate court directions regarding how the matter should be conducted, as justice may require. When exercising supervisory or revisionary jurisdiction, it is for the Court to decide whether or not to hear submissions from any party to the proceedings; no party has a right to be heard before the Court. However, if the Court intends to make a final order that is to the prejudice of any person, that person must first be given an opportunity of being heard.

One important aspect of the High Court's supervisory jurisdiction is its ability to judicially review the decisions of inferior tribunals (including subordinate courts) and other decision-making bodies and persons such as government agencies and officials. The jurisdiction originates from the ancient "jurisdiction in error" exercised by the King's Bench which is now a division of the High Court of Justice of England and Wales. Although the exercise of this jurisdiction by the Singapore High Court is not mentioned in any statute, the Court is specifically empowered to issue to any person or authority any direction, order or writ for the enforcement of any right conferred by written law or for any other purpose, including the following prerogative orders:

- a mandatory order (formerly known as mandamus);
- a prohibiting order (formerly known as a prohibition);
- a quashing order (formerly known as certiorari); and
- an order for review of detention (formerly known as a writ of habeas corpus).

Such orders were issued by the King's Bench in the exercise of its judicial review jurisdiction.

In theory, when exercising judicial review of administrative action, the Court's task is only to ensure that the decision in question was made according to the law. Even though it may disagree with the decision, it will not substitute its own decision for that of the decision-maker. In practice, however, it is sometimes difficult to tell whether the Court is applying that principle. The branch of law dealing with this facet of the Court's jurisdiction is administrative law.

==== Revisionary jurisdiction ====
The High Court may call for and examine the record of any civil proceedings before any subordinate court to satisfy itself that any decision made was correct, legal and proper, and that the proceedings were not irregular. Having called for the records, the Court may give orders, including directing that a new trial be held, as seem necessary to secure that substantial justice is done. Although the Court can either act on its own motion or at the instance of a party, it will not entertain a request by a party to exercise its power of revision if the party could have appealed from the subordinate court decision but failed to do so.

The High Court may also exercise powers of revision in respect of criminal proceedings and matters in subordinate courts. On calling for and examining the records of criminal proceedings or otherwise, the Court may direct a magistrate to make further inquiries into any complaints of offences that have been dismissed, or into the case of any accused person who has been discharged. The Court may also exercise powers that it exercises upon an appeal, such as reversing a conviction or altering a sentence, except that the Court is not authorized to exercise its revisionary jurisdiction to convert a finding of acquittal into one of conviction. As in civil cases, when the Court is exercising its powers of revision it is up to it to decide whether or not to hear submissions from any party, and no party can claim a right to be heard. However, no order that prejudices an accused shall be made unless he or she has had an opportunity of being heard either personally or by advocate in his or her own defence. When a case has been revised by the High Court, it will certify its decision or order to the trial court, which may then make further orders that conform to the certified decision.

== Judicial precedent ==
Under the principles of stare decisis (judicial precedent), the High Court is bound by decisions of the Court of Appeal. This means if there is a decision of the Court of Appeal that is relevant to a case being heard in the High Court, the High Court must apply it even if it feels that the decision was wrongly decided or may cause injustice. In turn, decisions of the High Court are binding on District Courts and Magistrates' Courts.

A Judge of the High Court is not bound by previous decisions by other High Court Judges. However, as a matter of comity, a Court will generally not depart from a previous decision unless there is a good reason to do so, particularly if that decision has stood for some time. If there are conflicting High Court decisions, it is up to the Court of Appeal to decide which of those decisions are correct.

== See also ==
- Judicial system of Singapore
- Supreme Court of Singapore
- Court of Appeal of Singapore
- Singapore International Commercial Court
- State Courts of Singapore
- Family Justice Courts
- Law of Singapore
- Judicial officers of the Republic of Singapore
- Lawyers in Singapore
