= Uniform Fiduciary Income and Principal Act =

The Uniform Fiduciary Income and Principal Act (UFIPA) is one of the uniform acts that have been proposed in an attempt to harmonize the law in all fifty U.S. states. UFIPA was finalized and adopted by the Uniform Law Commission (ULC) in 2018.

UFIPA is an updated version of the Uniform Principal and Income Act (UPIA). For the latest revision, the title was changed to avoid confusion with a closely related act, the Uniform Prudent Investor Act—which also utilizes the acronym UPIA—and to differentiate the revised act from its predecessors. The UPIA originally was approved by the National Conference of Commissioners of Uniform State Laws in 1931, and was revised twice in 1962 and 1997, and amended in 2008.

The purpose of UFIPA and its predecessor, the UPIA, is to provide procedures by which personal representatives administering estates, and trustees administering trusts, allocate receipts and disbursements to income and principal. The goal of the law is to carry out the intentions of the decedent or trust creator, and to govern the proper distribution of assets to trust beneficiaries, heirs and devisees.

To be enacted into law in a state, UFIPA must be adopted by a state's legislature. To date, almost every state in the United States has adopted the UPIA—the predecessor to UFIPA—although, sometimes with modifications. Utah was the first state to adopt UFIPA into law in the United States on April 1, 2019, pursuant to SB 254. Bills to adopt UFIPA also have been introduced in Tennessee (SB 404), and Kansas (HB 2554), but are still pending as of May 2020.
