= Nina Felshin =

American art historian (born 1944)

- Born: 1944 (age 81–82)
- Occupations: Curator; writer; art historian; activist

Nina Felshin (born 1944) is an American curator, writer, art historian and activist. She edited But Is It Art? The Spirit of Art as Activism and has authored many articles and essays on art. Felshin is an independent curator and was a curator at Wesleyan University's Ezra and Cecile Zilkha Gallery in Middletown, Connecticut, The Contemporary Arts Center in Cincinnati, Ohio and The Corcoran Gallery of Art in Washington, D.C. While at Wesleyan, she co-taught a cross-discipline course on Issues in Contemporary Art.

== Partial list of curatorial projects ==
- Global Warning: Artists and Climate Change, 2009, Zilkha Gallery, Wesleyan University.
- Framing and Being Framed: The Uses of Documentary Photography, 2008, Zilkha Gallery, Wesleyan University.
- Disasters of War: From Goya to Golub, 2005, Zilkha Gallery, Wesleyan University.
- Black and Blue: Examining Police Violence, 2000–01, Zilkha Gallery, Wesleyan University.
- Embedded Metaphor, 1996–99.
- Empty Dress: Clothing as Surrogate in Recent Art, 1993–95.
- No Laughing Matter, 1991–93, Catalog
- The State of Upstate: New York Women Artists, 1990, curated by art historian Nina Felshin with the support of the National Museum of Women in the Arts. Jody Lafond
- The Presence of Absence: New Installations, 1989–93.
- Verbally Charged Images, 1984–86.

== See also ==
- Classificatory disputes about art
- List of Independent Curators International exhibitions
- Protest art
