= De Bonis =

De Bonis or De bonis may refer to:

- Francesco De Bonis (b. 1982), an Italian road bicycle racer
- De bonis non administratis, a legal term for assets remaining in an estate after the death or removal of the estate administrator

See also

- Bonis
- List of Latin phrases
