= Administration (probate law) =

Administration of an estate on death

In common-law jurisdictions, administration of an estate on death arises if the deceased is legally intestate, meaning they did not leave a will, or some assets are not disposed of by their will.

Where a person dies leaving a will appointing an executor, and that executor validly disposes of the property of the deceased within England and Wales, then the estate will go to probate. However, if no will is left, or the will is invalid or incomplete in some way, then administrators must be appointed. They perform a similar role to the executor of a will but, where there are no instructions in a will, the administrators must distribute the estate of the deceased according to the rules laid down by statute and the common trust.

Certain property falls outside the estate for administration purposes, the most common example probably being houses jointly owned that pass by survivorship on the first death of a couple into the sole name of the survivor. Other examples include discretionary death benefits from pension funds, accounts with certain financial institutions subject to a nomination and the proceeds of life insurance policies which have been written into trust. Trust property will also frequently fall outside the estate but will depend on the terms of the trust.

== Estate settlement ==
Estate settlement is the legal and administrative process that happens after a person passes away. Settling an estate means managing and distributing assets, debts, taxes, and following legal and financial obligations following a person's death. If there is a will, the estate needs to go through probate. If there is no will. the court will decide how assets will be distributed. This process includes identifying, and valuing the decedent's assets, paying debts, taxes, and transferring the remaining property to heirs or beneficiaries according to state or national law.

The estate settlement process typically takes between 12 and 18 months, depending on the estate's size, complexity and if there are existing disputes.

| Phases of estate settlement | What it means |
|---|---|
| Probate | Legal process that initiates the settlement of an estate. |
| Asset discovery | The executor has to identify and list all assets owned by the deceased person. |
| Debt | The executor has to notify creditors, and pay debts out of estate funds. |
| Tax compliance | Form 1040 and 1041 for US citizens and residents |
| Asset distribution | The executor has to distribute assets to beneficiaries. |
| Final accounting and closure | Final accounting report that needs to be submitted to probate court. There is a petition to close the estate. |

== Letter of administration ==
=== English law ===
Upon the death of a person intestate, or of one who left a will without appointing executors, or when the executors appointed by the will cannot or will not act, the Probate Division of the High Court of Justice or the local District Probate Registry will appoint an administrator who performs similar duties to an executor. The court does this by granting letters of administration to the person so entitled. Grants of administration may be either general (where the deceased has died intestate) or limited. The order in which the court will make general grants of letters follows the sequence:

1. The surviving spouse, or civil partner, as the case may be;
2. The next of kin;
3. The Crown;
4. A creditor;
5. A stranger.

Under the rules for distribution of estates without a will (the Intestacy Rules), where a child under 18 would inherit or a life interest would arise, the Court or District Probate Registry normally appoints a minimum of two administrators. On some estates, even under an intestate, it is not clear who are the next-of-kin, and probate research may be required to find the entitled beneficiaries.

An administrator (sometimes known as the administratrix, if female) acts as the personal representative of the deceased in relation to land and other property in the UK. Consequently, when the estate under administration consists wholly or mainly of land, the court will grant administration to the heir to the exclusion of the next of kin. In the absence of any heir or next of kin, the Crown or, depending on where the person died, the Duchy of Cornwall or Duchy of Lancaster has the right to property as bona vacantia. If a creditor claims and obtains a grant of administration, the court compels him or her to enter into a bond with two or more sureties that he or she will not prefer his or her debt to those of other creditors.

== Other types of letters of administration ==
The more important cases of grants of special letters of administration include the following:

- Administration cum testamento annexo, where the deceased has left a will but has appointed no executor to it, or the executor appointed has died or refuses to act. In this case the court will make the grant to the person, usually the residuary legatee, with the largest beneficial interest in the estate.
- Administration de bonis non administratis occurs in two cases:
  1. Where the executor dies intestate after probate without having completely administered the estate
  2. Where an administrator dies.

In the first case the principle of administration cum testamento is followed, in the second that of general grants in the selection of the person to whom letters are granted.

- Administration durante minore aetate, when the executor or the person entitled to the general grant is under age.
- Administration durante absentia, when the executor or administrator is out of the jurisdiction for more than a year.
- Administration pendente lite, where there is a dispute as to the person entitled to probate or a general grant of letters the court appoints an administrator till the question has been decided.

== See also ==
- Probate (administration, as to both testate and intestate estates, in the United States and England and Wales)
- Administration of Estates Act 1925
- Calendars of the Grants of Probate and Letters of Administration (CGPLA)
- Estate planning
