= Shia Islam in Singapore =

Religious group in Singapore

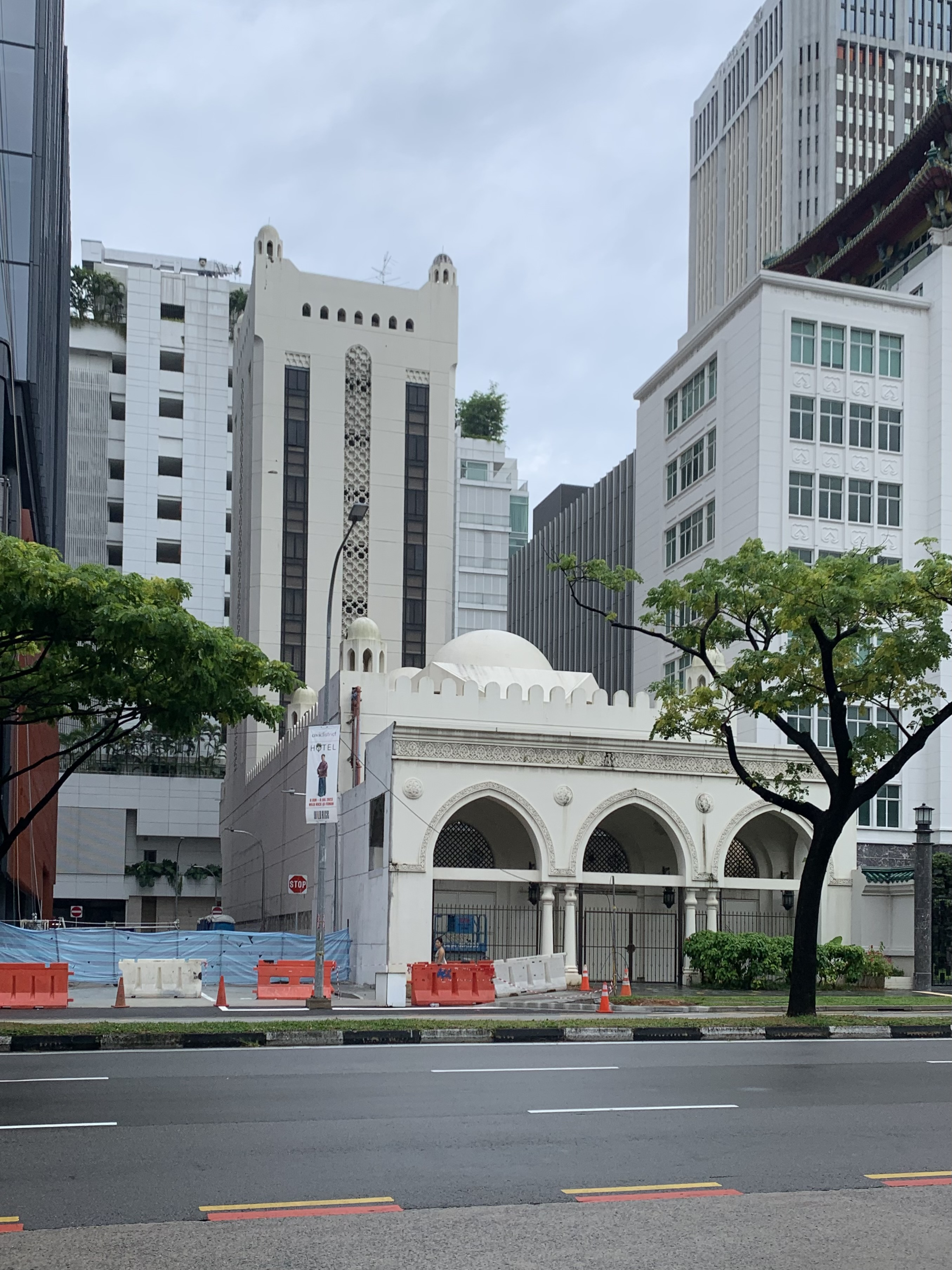
Masjid Al Burhani is a Dawoodi Shiite mosque in Singapore

Shia Muslims are a minority in Singapore, where Sunni Islam is the majority as in much of Southeast Asia. The Shia community in Singapore is considered part of the wider Muslim religious group alongside the majority Sunni and are afforded the same legal rights and protections covered by the Administration of Muslim Law Act, which does not explicitly name any one particular branch or sect. The most prominent branches in Singapore are the Twelver (also known locally as Ithna 'Asheri) and Isma'ili (mainly of the Dawoodi Bohra denomination).

== History ==
Shia Muslims have had contact with maritime Southeast Asia since ancient times due to Indian and Persian traders engaging in the local trade. The first documentation of Shi'ites in Singapore was a Malay language account (written in Jawi) of a 1864 procession celebrating Muharram.

Records documenting Gujarati traders of the Dawoodi Bohra denomination date back to 1875, when the first immigrants arrived to set up businesses, mainly dealing in dried goods and spices. They were considered as part of the "Indian Muslims" subgroup but were a distinctly separate community as the majority of Indian Muslims were Tamil-speaking and/or adhered to the Sunni sect. The Dawoodis built their own mosque, Burhani, located along 39 Hill Street. The original one-story mosque was torn down and replaced by an upgraded three-story building.

The Centre for Research on Islamic and Malay Affairs, a Singapore-based Muslim affairs think tank, noted that the majority local Sunni population frequently interacted with Shia businessmen and migrant workers due to Singapore being a cosmopolitan trading port since the colonial area. This was highlighted by the fact that the 1968 founding of Majlis Ugama Islam Singapura (MUIS, the Islamic Religious Council of Singapore) was supported by prominent Shia community leaders and professionals. The differences between the Shia and Sunni became much more pronounced within the local Muslim community following the Iranian Revolution in 1979 and the Shia community began to be viewed as "deviants" or followers of "a different religion". The government and MUIS sought to mitigate the potential divisions and unite the Muslim community by encouraging both Shi'ites and Sunnis to find common ground as fellow believers of Allah and participate in community events and activities promoting religious harmony.

In the 1970s Rajabali Jumabhoy and his wife Fatima Premjee bought a shophouse in Lim Ah Woo Road where Muharram majaalis were addressed by Maulana Mazahir (an Urdu-language preacher from Lucknow, India). The number of adherents rose during the 1980s due to a significant number of Malay Muslims converting from the Sunni sect, necessitating the need for better representation.

=== Founding of the Jaafari Muslim Association ===
A Shiite association named Jaafari Muslim Association was approved in 1998 by the Majlis Ugama Islam Singapura. The first meeting was held on 9 January 1998 at the Imam Bargah. The founding committee members were as follows:

- Ameerali Jumabhoy
- Abdul Karim Sulaiman
- Ahmadjirony Alap
- Ali Y. Aladin
- Jahari Hj. Affandi
- Asad Jumabhoy
- Muhammad. Ithinin Kasmin
- Muhammad Said Saibon
- Tayib Alias
- Kassamali S. Merchant
- Muhammad Nabil Abdullah Lam

== Contemporary issues ==
Although Shia–Sunni relations had long been cordial due to secular government legislations protecting religious freedom and promoting inter-religious cooperation in a pluralistic society, the tensions between the two sects overseas was brought to the attention of the public due to the protracted sectarian violence and civil war in Syria and ISIS utilising the internet to recruit fighters from Southeast Asia. Anti-Shia sentiment is a source of concern with the rise in arrests and detentions of self-radicalised Sunni Muslims intending to travel to Syria to join the "holy war" against the Shi'ites. Professor Syed Farid al-Attas noted that the current internet-savvy generation were still able to access anti-Shia pro-ISIS materials from radicalised groups based in Malaysia and Indonesia and prejudices regarding Shi'ites being "heretics" have yet to be adequately addressed by MUIS.
