= De bonis non administratis =

De bonis non administratis, Latin for "of goods not administered," is a legal term for assets remaining in an estate after the death or removal of the estate administrator. The second administrator is called the administrator de bonis non and distributes the remaining assets. In the United States's Uniform Probate Code, these titles have been replaced by successor personal representative.

The most common cause of a grant of de bonis non by a court is where the administrator dies. However, it can also be granted in cases where the chain of representation is broken. Such would happen, for example, when the executor of a will has obtained probate, but then dies intestate. (Normally, if the executor dies testate, the representation passes to the executor of the first executor's estate upon probate of the latter's own will. This is governed by Section 7 of the Administration of Estates Act 1925 (15 & 16 Geo. 5. c. 23) in the United Kingdom.)

== See also ==
- Personal representative
