= Lafond =

Lafond is a surname, and may refer to:

- Andréanne Lafond (1919 or 1920–2012), Canadian journalist
- Charles-Nicolas Lafond (1773–1835), French artist painting
- Everett LaFond (1901–1961), American commercial fisherman and politician
- Florence Lafond, Canadian film director and screenwriter
- Guy Lafond (1953–2013), Canadian scientist
- Henri Lafond (1894–1963), French banker and businessman
- Jean-Baptiste Lafond (born 1961), French rugby union player
- Jean-Daniel Lafond (born 1944), Canadian filmmaker
- Jody Lafond (born 1956), American video artist and documentary filmmaker
- Jorge Lafond (1952–2003), Brazilian actor, comedian, dancer and drag queen
- Mary Ellen Turpel-Lafond (born 1963), Canadian lawyer
- Paul Lafond (1919–1988), Canadian senator
- Philip Lafond (born 1961), Canadian professional wrestler
- R. Gauthier-Lafond, French Olympic sports shooter
- Thea LaFond (born 1994), Dominican triple jumper

== See also ==
- Lafond, Alberta, a hamlet in Alberta, Canada
- Lafond Bay, a bay in Antarctica
- Lafon (disambiguation)
