= Calendars of the Grants of Probate and Letters of Administration =

Index of legal documents in the constituents of the UK (1858-)

Calendar of the Grants of Probate and Letters of Administration or CGPLA was an index published in the United Kingdom and Ireland that lists an alphabetical summary of probate documents such as wills. The correct full title for Ireland is Calendar of the Grants of Probate and Letters of Administration Made in the Principal Registry and in the Several District Registries 1858-1920.

Every year from 1858, volumes of short summaries of grants of probate and of letters of administration were created, in alphabetical order by surname. For each grant of probate, these include the name, address, and occupation (or other description) of the deceased, the place and date of the death, the date on which probate was granted and the value of the estate, and the names and addresses of any executors.

For 1858 to 1877, there is also a consolidated index.
