= Laffoon =

Laffoon is a surname. Notable people with the surname include:

- Ky Laffoon (1908–1984), American golfer
- Polk Laffoon (1844–1906), American politician
- Reuben Laffoon (1854–1929), Washington state pioneer and lawyer
- Ruby Laffoon (1869–1941), American politician

== See also ==
- Lafon (disambiguation)
- Laffon
