= Lafon =

Lafon or LaFon may refer to:

== Places ==
- Lafon County, an administrative area in South Sudan
- Lafon, South Sudan, the headquarters of Lafon County

== People with the surname ==
- Barthelemy Lafon (1769–1820), architect, engineer, city planner and surveyor in late colonial-period New Orleans
- Chantal Lafon (born 1965), French rower
- Guillaume Joseph Nicolas de Lafon-Blaniac (1773–1833), French general
- Jacky Lafon, an actress
- Jean-Jacques Lafon (born 1955), French singer-songwriter (one-hit wonder ) and painter
- Marie-Hélène Lafon (born 1962), French educator and writer
- Mathieu Lafon (born 1984). French professional football player.
- Pauline LaFon Gore, mother of former United States Vice President Al Gore
- Phil Lafon, Canadian pro wrestler
- Thomy Lafon (1810–1893), Creole business man, philanthropist and human rights activist
- William M. LaFon, President of the West Virginia Senate from 1939 to 1941

== See also ==
- Lafond
- Laffon, a surname
- Laffoon, a surname
