= Burhani Mosque =

Shia mosque in Singapore

- Masjid Al-Burhani
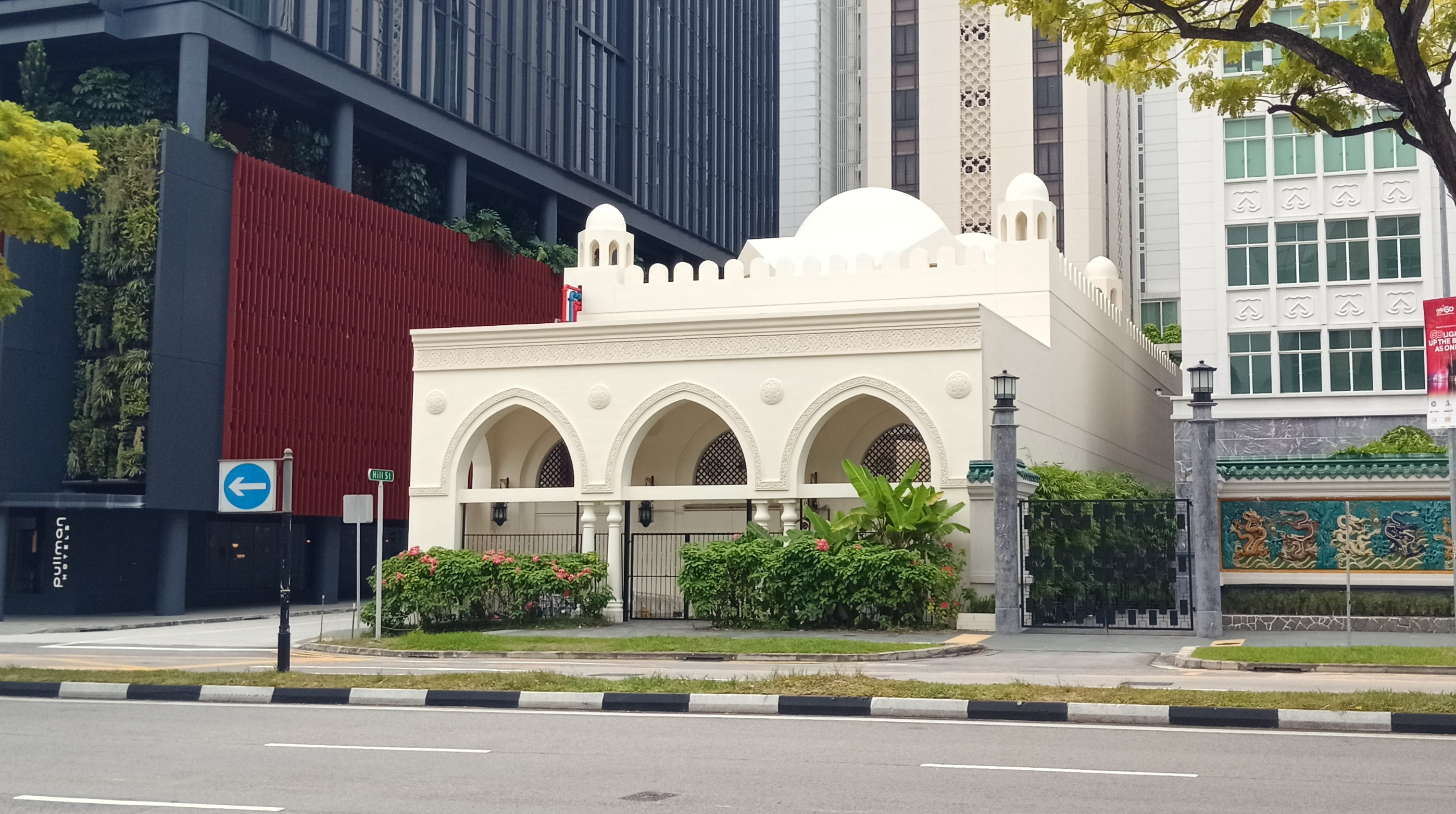
- Burhani Mosque in 2025

- Location in Singapore

Religion
- Affiliation: Dawoodi Bohra branch of the Isma'ili sect of the Shi'ites

Location
- Location: 39 Hill St, Singapore 179364
- Country: Singapore
- Interactive map of Burhani Mosque
- Coordinates: 1.2935517°N 103.8501958°E

Architecture
- Style: Modern
- Established: 1829
- Groundbreaking: 1895
- Completed: 2000

Specifications
- Dome: 1
- Minaret: 1

Burhani Mosque (Malay: Masjid Burhani) also known as Masjid Al-Burhani is located at Hill Street, Singapore. It is the main place of worship for the local Dawoodi Bohra community. The only Shi'a mosque in Singapore, the Burhani Mosque is also nearby the City Hall MRT station.

== Background ==
=== Dawoodi Bohra community ===
The Dawoodi Bohra branch of the Isma'ili Shi'a had a significant presence in Singapore, mainly through immigrants, in the late 19th century. Shi'ism in general, however, had a history of being in Singapore before the First World War. In 1864, it was recorded in a letter that Shia Islam was being adhered to by some of the Malays who celebrated Muharram.

== History ==
The original mosque was established in 1829 by the Dawoodi Bohra immigrants. The mosque was built on land owned by the Essabhai Motabhai family, which they renewed in 1895. The Dawoodi Bohra community was slowly growing in Singapore, thus in 1990, plans were made to build a new mosque for the community. The 51st Da'i al-Mutlaq of the Dawoodi Bohras, Taher Saifuddin, appeared at the mosque to approve the new mosque's structure during his visit to Singapore. The 52nd Da'i, Mohammed Burhanuddin, also further approved of the project during his own visit. The mosque was reopened in 2000.

From the 90s to the year 2000, the mosque was transformed from a single-story building to a larger, three-story building complete with various modern facilities. Currently, the mosque is under the protection of the MUIS.

== See also ==
- Shia Islam in Singapore
- List of mosques in Singapore
