= Uniform Principal and Income Act =

Uniform Act in the United States

The Uniform Principal and Income Act (UPAIA) is one of the uniform acts that have been promulgated in an attempt to harmonize the law in all 50 U.S. states. The Act was completed by the Commissioners on Uniform State Laws in 1997, and amended in 2000.

The purpose of the UPAIA (sometimes referred to as the UPIA) is to provide procedures by which trustees administering trusts, and personal representatives administering estates, allocate receipts and payments to principal and income. The aim of the law is to ensure that the intention of the trust creator or decedent is carried out, and to govern the proper distribution of assets to trust beneficiaries, heirs and devisees.

To be enacted into law, the Act must be adopted by the state legislature. As of 2004, most states had adopted the Act (sometimes with modifications).
