= Ancillary administration =

Ancillary administration is "the administration of a decedent's estate in a state other than the one in which she lived, for the purpose of disposing of property she owned there." Another definition is the "administration of an estate's asset's in another state." This is often a necessary procedure in probate, because the decedent may own property in a state other than his domicile, which is subject to the law of the state in which it sits. Generally, an ancillary administration proceeding should commence in any county where the decedent's had property. While the probate process is governed by state law, each county may have different procedures and customs.

An ancillary administrator is the personal representative who handles the property in the other state under ancillary administration. Most major court systems will have forms and checklists for ancillary administrators to use.
