= Reuben Laffoon =

American lawyer (1854–1929)

Reuben Francis Laffoon
- Born: March 10, 1854; Claiborne county, Tennessee
- Died: June 28, 1929 (aged 75); Tacoma
- Burial place: Tacoma Cemetery
- Occupations: Lawyer; real estate businessman; mining businessman
- Organizations: Scottish Rite; Order of the Eastern Star
- Known for: Tacoma's pioneer and one of the first lawyers authorized to practice in the federal court of the Washington Western District. He was highly esteemed in law circles of the city, worked as real estate businessman, and invested into mining companies in Washington, Nevada and Alaska.
- Spouse: Emma Pearman (married in 1880)
- Children: 2

Reuben Francis Laffoon (March 10, 1854 – June 28, 1929) was a pioneer and lawyer in Tacoma, Washington, settling in the city during the development boom of 1880s. Laffoon dedicated his first year in Tacoma to real estate, but then resumed his law practice and operated from an office located in the Tacoma Chamber of Commerce building. He gained recognition in the field and was known as a prestigious specialist. He was one of the first lawyers authorized to practice in the federal court of the Washington Western District. In 1912, he was appointed to the position of federal bankruptcy referee by Judge Edward E. Cushman.

Laffoon was interested in mining, and invested in companies in Washington and Alaska. He abandoned his law career for three years to work in a mining business in Nevada. After he returned to his primary occupation, his knowledge and practical experience in the mining business fueled his success in mining law.

Laffoon was devoted to Masonry, becoming a Mason in 1880. He was a member of the lodge in Tacoma and of the Order of the Eastern Star. He acquired a number of degrees in the Scottish Rite and later was among the aspirants for the 31st degree, one of the highest degrees in the rite.

== Early life, family, and education ==
Laffoon was born in Claiborne County, Tennessee, on March 10, 1854. His parents were Drewry Laffoon from North Carolina, and Minerva Laffoon (Stone), from Tennessee. Laffoon's father came to Tennessee as a child, and as an adult worked as a farmer. Reuben was the eldest of four siblings, including two brothers, John H. and Mark, and a sister, Saleta.

In 1859, the family moved to Cass County, Missouri, where Drewry bought a farm. They lived on a lively street during the Civil War and provided food for both Union and Confederate soldiers passing by. At times, the family was left with only wheat bran to eat. Finally, the family moved to Nebraska City. When the war was over, they returned to their home in Missouri. Their farm has been damaged in the war, but they stayed and rebuilt their former home.

Laffoon graduated from the Southwest Missouri State Normal School at Warrensburg.

== Career ==
=== Early career ===
At nineteen years old, Laffoon left home to travel around the U.S. Becoming a pioneer in Kansas, he taught in school there and in Missouri for several years. He was attracted to the pioneer life in the western part of the country and travelled extensively throughout western and southwestern states.

Laffoon combined his teaching with the study of law. In 1886, he started his law practice in Coldwater, Kansas. He worked there for several months, and then left for Tacoma, Washington.

=== Washington and Nevada States ===
Laffoon came to Washington state in 1887 settling in Tacoma. The decade of 1880–1890 was important in Tacoma's history and development. 1883 was the year when the two governments of Old Tacoma and New Tacoma merged, consolidating two towns into the city of Tacoma. A transcontinental railroad terminus and the Northern Pacific Railway headquarters were built, the city was connected by ocean trading to southeast Asia, important infrastructure industries were developing, and the population grew rapidly.

Laffoon spent his first year in Tacoma working in real estate. Then he resumed his law practice, and by 1903, operated from an office located in the Chamber of Commerce building. He became a member of the Pierce County Bar Association (later the Tacoma Bar Association), and with time became known as a prestigious and well-known legal specialist.

Laffoon had financial dealings with mining companies in Washington and Alaska. He left his position as a lawyer for three years to work in the mining business in Nevada. When he returned to his law career, his knowledge and experience in the business allowed him to make mining law one of his specialties. According to Prosser, a founder of the Washington State Historical Society, Laffoon was devoted to his job and was one of Tacoma's "prominent lawyers."

Laffoon was one of the first lawyers allowed to practice in the federal court for the Western District of Washington in Tacoma. In 1912, he succeeded Judge Worden as a federal bankruptcy referee, having been appointed to the position by his former law partner, Judge Edward E. Cushman.

== Masonic membership ==
Laffoon became a Mason in Belton Lodge, No. 54 of Belton, Missouri, in 1880. Later, he was a member of Tacoma Lodge, No. 22, and of the Fern Chapter of Order of the Eastern Star.

By 1902, Laffoon had acquired the 18th degree in the Scottish Rite of Tacoma. In 1905, he attended the Scottish Rite Masons meeting as an aspirant for the 31st Masonic degree, one of the highest degrees in the rite.

== Personal life, family, and death ==
In 1880, Laffoon married Emma Pearman, in Missouri. Later, they lived on South 8th street in Tacoma, and had two daughters, Agnes and Emma. Laffoon's daughter Agnes married Col. William J. Sutherland, who was a promoter of Alaskan gold mines. They had a son, William J. Sutherland Jr. After Sutherland's death in 1912, Laffoon was one of the ancillary executors of his son-in-law's estate, and together with Agnes, Laffoon was involved in a legal dispute over Sutherland's property.

Reuben Laffoon died on June 28, 1929, in Tacoma, and was buried in the Tacoma Cemetery.

== See also ==
- Referee in Bankruptcy

== Literature cited ==
- Blethen, Alden J., ed. (December 29, 1905), "Masons meet in Seattle", Seattle Daily Times, Seattle: The Seattle Times Company, p. 5, ISSN 2639-4898, LCCN sn86072007, OCLC 1765328
- "Two claim estate of debts", New York Times, New York: H.J. Raymond & Co, p. 7, March 7, 1912, ISSN 0362-4331, LCCN sn78004456, OCLC 1645522
- "Died owing a million", New York Times, vol. LXI, no. 19860, New York: H.J. Raymond & Co, p. 1, June 9, 1912, ISSN 0362-4331, LCCN sn78004456, OCLC 1645522
- Scripps, Edward, ed. (July 23, 1912), "Laffoon succeeds judge Worden", The Tacoma Times, Tacoma: E. W. Scripps Company, p. 7, ISSN 2158-4729, LCCN sn88085187, OCLC 17347623
- Gallacci, Caroline Denyer; Karabaich, Ron (2001), The City of Destiny and the South Sound: An Illustrated History of Tacoma and Pierce County, Dallas: Heritage Media Corp, ISBN 1886483574, LCCN 2001097044, OCLC 48910125
- Hodson, John Milton; Upton, William H.; Brown, Jonas W.; Hedges, Cornelius (1902), Masonic history of the Northwest: a graphic recital of the organization and growth of freemasonry in the North West states, comprising an historical review of the institution, San Francisco: History Publishing Company, OCLC 16697272
- Hunt, Herbert (1916), Tacoma its history and its builders; a half century of activity, vol. 1, Chicago: S. J. Clarke Publishing Company, LCCN 18005073, OCLC 656923949
- Prosser, William Farrand (1903), Lewis, Edward Gardner (ed.), A history of the Puget Sound country, its resources, its commerce and its people, New York City: Edward Gardner Lewis, LCCN 05013767
