= Jody Lafond =

American video artist and documentary filmmaker

- Born: 1956 (age 69–70); Tonawanda, NY
- Known for: Video Art, Documentary

Jody Lafond (born 1956) is an American video artist and documentary filmmaker, and a co-founder of the Squeaky Wheel Film & Media Art Center in Buffalo, NY. Lafond began producing work in the 1980s, and from 1990 to 1991 was the producer of Artwaves, a weekly public-access cable television program in Buffalo. Her works have been shown in Canada and the United States. Two career retrospectives of her video work have been held at Hallwalls Contemporary Arts Center, one in 1994 and one in 2001.

== Early career ==
During the winter of 1979, Lafond and her friend Susan Clements attended a performance by the art duo the Kipper Kids. This was her first exposure to performance art.

Lafond received a BA in history from the University at Buffalo in 1986, where a film course started an interest in video and filmmaking. Subsequently, she completed an MAH in Media Studies & Theater from the University at Buffalo.

== Style and themes ==
Lafond and others active in Buffalo in the 1980s and 1990s often addressed issues of freedom of speech, human rights, and access to media. Lafond's work often focuses on relationships between men and women.

== Exhibitions and screenings ==
In 1983, Lafond had a screening of her early work at Hallwalls Contemporary Arts Center as part of New Buffalo Video. The program included work by Toni Billoni, Armin Heurich, Debbie Jordan, Brian Springer and Julie Zando. Lafond was active in founding the Squeaky Wheel Film & Media Art Center, which emphasized the democratization of new media.

Her work was included in the show The State of Upstate: New York Women Artists, curated by art historian Nina Felshin with the support of the National Museum of Women in the Arts, Washington, D.C. in 1990. In 1995, a video created by Lafond in collaboration with Susan Clements screened at Art in General as part of Transmissions of Memory, a program on video work by artists in New York state. Her videos and documentaries have also been screened at NY Video Festival and the Images Film Festival, among others.

Lafond has had two retrospectives, both at Hallwalls. The first, a mid-career retrospective of her video work, was held in 1994. This was followed by a second retrospective at the same institution in 2001. Her works have been described as "small-scaled, understated gems". Her work was part of a thirty-year retrospective exhibit celebrating the Squeaky Wheel Film & Media Art Center, where it was commended for still showing "Squeaky Wheel’s core inspirational and motivational concept."

== Awards ==
Lafond is the recipient of a 2001 NYSCA Media Grant and NYFA Video Fellowships in 1988 and 1992.
