= Matrimonial law of Singapore =

The matrimonial law of Singapore categorises marriages contracted in Singapore into two categories: civil marriages and Muslim marriages. The Registry of Marriage (ROM) administers civil marriages in accordance to the Women's Charter, while the Registry of Muslim Marriages (ROMM) administers Muslim marriages in accordance to the Administration of Muslim Law Act (AMLA). All marriages performed in Singapore must be registered with the relevant registry in order to be legally valid.

== Civil marriages ==
Civil marriages are for couples where one or both partners are non-Muslim. Polygamy is prohibited.

=== Legal process ===
The two parties have to register a date either at the Registry of Marriage (ROM) or on the ROM website. The chosen date will be at least 21 days after the date of registration and within three months of the date of registration. A marriage licence can only be issued on proof of a number of conditions (see below) by statutory declaration. Both parties must appear in person at the registrar to declare that their intended marriage adheres to the following:

1. for couples where at least one party is not a Singapore citizen or Singapore permanent resident, one of the parties to the intended marriage must have been physically present in Singapore for at least 15 days preceding the date of the notice, not including the day of arrival in Singapore;
2. each of the parties is 21 years of age or above, or if not, is divorced or is a widower or widow or has had his or her previous marriage declared null and void;
3. if either party is a minor who has not been previously married, the consent of the appropriate person mentioned in the Second Schedule (click here) must have been given in writing or consent of the High Court has been given;
4. neither party is below the age of 18 years (by the date of solemnization); (unless certain exceptions are granted)
5. there is no lawful impediment to the marriage; and
6. neither of the parties to the intended marriage is married under any law, religion, custom or usage to any person other than the person with whom such marriage is proposed to be contracted.
7. where one of the parties to the proposed marriage has been previously married but is divorced, the party must also state whether he/she owes any arrears in respect of any maintenance which is payable under a maintenance order.

They must then bring their approval to a Licensed Solemniser, which can be religious leaders (order of the church, Buddhist, Taoist, Hindu, Sikh), judge, Justice of Peace, and grassroots leaders. Marriage counselling are also offered by family service centres endorsed by the Ministry of Social and Family Development.

=== Inter-faith marriages ===
Inter-faith marriage is allowed as civil marriages. A Muslim may marry a non-Muslim partner civilly (including marriages that are not permitted under sharia law).

== Muslim marriages ==
Muslim marriages are for couples where both partners are Muslim. A man may take up to four wives provided that he meets financial requirements and obtains the consent of existing wives.

Under the law, a Muslim can marry at the age of puberty and whereupon the bride is a single unmarried woman (commonly known as a virgin bride or 'Anak Dara'), the wali must grant consent to the marriage. The wali in this case will be the natural father, natural blood brother (legitimate), paternal grandfather, uncle (brother of the father) and whereupon a woman is a child out of wedlock, the solemn declaration of the natural mother must be made in the name of Allah, and the like if the father is no longer known to exist, or have gone away and the next of kin is not known.

In this case, a Wali Hakim or Wali Raja is called upon and the wali or next of kin will be the administrator of the region, state or the like, thus the naming of Hakim (judge) or Raja (King/Sultan in the ancient days). The Kadi (Khadhi) can also cite for which whereupon the parties concerned are away by 2 marhalah (approximately two days by walking distance, about 90 km), the terms are being met by using Allah as the Wali Mukminin. This strict conditions must be met for the solemnisation of the marriage called the Nikah.

If the father is still alive but unknown whereabouts in Singapore, the Registry will take out a petition notice in the local papers for him to be summoned to the Muslim Court for the marriage to be approved. This takes within 30 days.

No wali is needed if the bride is a Muslim convert and is the only convert in the family.

Rules of the Nikah are the existence of the bride, groom, two male Muslim witnesses or four female Muslim witnesses (independent of the family), The existence of the Wali, Kadi and Mahar or Mas Kawin in the region. The dowry is not mandatory as it is a gift to the bride's family to cater for the wedding expenses. The mahar (currently set at least S$200) is the equivalent of the wife's expenses to be given for the upbringing as it is part of the Taklik or terms of the agreement. Think of it as the alimony.

During the registration, the parties must be in attendance (except for the witnesses) to sign the affidavit for the application at the ROMM. The bridegroom will sign the agreement for petition and application to wed and book the solemnisation date. If the interviewing Kadi is not satisfied of the needs of Islamic knowledge, he can require them to take additional classes prior to allowing them to marry.

Couples should be of the age of 21 but the age of 16 is allowed with consent of the parents present. Marriage of bride under 16 require special licensing.

The couple must by then attend the marriage counselling course by an approved provider. The certificate issued is only valid for three years.

A Decree Nisi Absolute or divorce certificate is required for the woman if she has existing marriage and must lapse for 90 days before the wedding. If the groom has existing living wife, the husband is required to show evidence of the financial means to support the wives, as well as obtain permission all his existing wives before a polygamous marriage is approved. A man is allowed to have a maximum of four living wives at any point in time.

Upon satisfying all conditions, the Muslim marriage will take place which consists of the khutbah or sermon of Nikah, the akad or agreement of both parties and the thanksgiving.

The khutbah is basically the sunnah of Muhammad stating that his sunnah is of three, of Brushing the teeth to ensure good hygiene, to wear attar and of Nikah for he wants to see many his followers upon the day of Judgement.

During the akad, the Kadi will ask the bride of the consent to the marriage and ask for the signature to be on the certificate and carry on with the agreement in the presence of the witnesses. He will require the wali to ask him to marry his daughter(or ward) off on his behalf as by law, he is required to solemnise the marriage. The Kadi will do a handshake saying that "I be wed thee, Of (the groom name) to (the bride name) with the Mahr or Mas kahwin of (the amount) and in the handshake, he must say he agrees to take the bride in wed with the said mahar.

After that, the groom will then say aloud the taqlik or defaulting terms of the marriage for which it can be dissolved by the wife complaining to the Syariah court, which are of hurting her (or her properties), not giving her nafkah (means of sustainability) by him or the next of kin for 6 months (thus the amount of the mahar) and leaving her for more than six months and in which the court finds true will decree that the marriage is dissolved by one talak. The divorce will be finalised after 90 days of the talak nikah.

== Same-sex marriages ==
Same-sex marriages are not allowed in Singapore.

Under the category of civil marriages, the gender of a person is the one stated in his/her National Registration Identity Card. Before 1991, a transgender person may marry a person who is of the opposite sex from his/her sex as stated in the NRIC. Between 1991 and 1996, the High Court of Singapore ruled that transsexuals cannot be married in Singapore. Since 1996, a new Bill was presented and accepted to amend the Women's Charter to allow post-operative transgender people to marry opposite-sex spouses.

On the other hand, in the context of Muslim marriages, a transgender person is not allowed to marry regardless of sex change done. This is waived if the person is born with both genital organs (hermaphrodite or pseudohermaphroditism) and makes a change.

== Marriage Restriction Policy on Work Permit holders ==
Under the Marriage Restriction Policy, foreigners who currently or formerly hold a Singapore Work Permit are required to seek approval from the Ministry of Manpower if they wish to marry a Singapore citizen or permanent resident. This applies even after their Work Permits have been cancelled and they have left Singapore. However, former Work Permit holders who have their work passes converted to S Pass or Employment Pass, or have since become Singapore citizens or permanent residents, are not required to seek approval.

If prior approval is needed from the Ministry of Manpower but the couple fails to do so, the non-citizen spouse may have their work privileges revoked, and may be barred from entering and residing in Singapore. However, this does not affect the validity of the marriage.

== Singaporeans marrying overseas ==
The law does not require Singaporean or Permanent Resident couples who married overseas to re-register (includes "converting" or "endorsing" a foreign marriage certificate) with the Singapore ROM. The marriage certificate issued by the competent authority of the foreign country may be accepted as prima facie evidence of a marriage between the parties named in the certificate.

All marriages contracted or solemnised outside Singapore ─

(a) which have been registered in accordance with and are valid under the law of the place in which the marriages were contracted or celebrated; and

(b) to which both parties possess the capacity to marry under the law of their respective countries of domicile, are valid in Singapore.

The final arbiter of any dispute as to the validity of such marriages in Singapore is the Court of Law.

== Divorce ==
Divorce procedures are different for civil marriages and Muslim marriages. Divorce proceedings of civil marriages are carried out in the Family Court, while divorce proceedings of Muslim marriages are carried out in the Syariah Court.

One can obtain a divorce in Singapore's Family Court if one or both spouses is a Singapore Citizen, has lived in Singapore for at least three years, or is domiciled in Singapore. It is suggested that those hoping to divorce first seek legal advice as there are a number of regulations that must be followed. For example, you cannot apply for a divorce if you have been married less than three years unless you have the Court’s permission to do so. Likewise, those salvaging marriages.

To prove that the marriage has ended, the spouse seeking divorce must show the Court that one or more of the following facts is true:

- that the spouse has committed adultery, and you find it intolerable to live with him or her
- that the spouse has behaved in such a way that you cannot reasonably be expected to live with him or her
- that the spouse has deserted you for at least two years
- if the spouse agrees to the divorce, that you and your spouse have been separated for at least three years
- if the spouse does not agree to the divorce, that you and your spouse have been separated for at least four years.

Typically to start the divorce proceedings, a 3-step process is required. First, one needs to file a write for divorce, then a statement of particulars and finally a statement of claim.

It is expected that sometime in 2023 Singapore will introduce new legislation that opens the door to a "no fault" divorce. Unlike the current legislation that requires one of the parties to effectively take the blame for the irretrievable breakdown of their marriage, divorce by mutual agreement will remove this requirement. It is hoped this change in legislation will lessen the impact of divorce, particularly on parents with children.
