= Letters of Administration =

Court documents granted for estates

Letters of Administration are granted by a surrogate court or probate registry to appoint appropriate people to deal with a deceased person's estate where property will pass under intestacy rules or where there are no executors living (and willing and able to act) having been validly appointed under the deceased's will. Traditionally, letters of administration granted to a representative of a testator's estate are called "letters of administration with the will annexed" or "letters of administration cum testamento annexo" or "c.t.a.".

Essentially, this document is issued to the person who will administer the estate of someone who dies without a will. As outlined by the Cornell Legal Information Institute, "The letters authorize the administrator to settle the deceased person's estate according to the state's intestate succession laws. Banks, brokerages, and government agencies often require a certified copy of the letters before accepting the administrator's authority to collect the deceased person's assets." If a deceased has a surviving spouse, this individual will have priority in receiving a letter of administration over others, including children; age alone does not render an individual ineligible to serve as a fiduciary.

== See also ==
- Administration of an estate on death
- Probate
