= Laffon =

Laffon is a surname. Notable people with the surname include:

- André-Daniel Laffon de Ladebat (1746–1829), French financier, politician and philanthropist
- Carmen Laffón (1934–2021), Spanish figurative painter and sculptor
- Jacques-Alexandre Laffon de Ladebat (1719–1797), French shipbuilder and slave trader
- Jakob Amsler-Laffon (1823–1912), Swiss mathematicians, physicist and engineer
- Yolande Laffon (1895–1992), French stage and film actress

== See also ==
- Lafon (disambiguation)
- Laffoon
