= List of Independent Curators International exhibitions =

This is a list of exhibitions by Independent Curators International since 1975.

== List ==
Exhibition	Curator(s)	Date	
Precious Cargo, Precious World: Archive of the Art/NaturSci Movement	exhibit at the University of Maine 2023.	mp Warming	2024 - ongoing
The Taxonomy of Shadows: On Photographic Collectivism	Serubiri Moses	–	
Mud + Corn + Stone + Blue	Laura Augusta	2024	
Teddy Sandoval and the Butch Gardens School of Art	C. Ondine Chavoya and David Evans Frantz	2023–24	
States of Becoming	Fitsum Shebeshe	2022–25	
Seeing Sound	Barbara London	2021–24	
Notes for Tomorrow	Charles Campbell, Freya Chou, Giulia Colletti, Veronica Cordeiro, Allison Glenn, Tessa Maria Guazon, PJ Gubatina Policarpio, Ivan Isaev, Ross Jordan, Drew Kahuʻāina Broderick, Josh Tengan, Esteban King Álvarez, João Laia, Luis Carlos Manjarrés Martínez, Fadzai Veronica Muchemwa, Lydia Y. Nichols, Marie Hélène Pereira, Balimunsi Philip, Josseline Pinto, Florencia Portocarrero, Shahana Rajani, Rachel Waldrop (Reese), Marina Reyes Franco, Mari Spirito, Alexandra Stock, Eszter Szakács, Fatoş Üstek, Su Wei, and Sharmila Wood	2021–24	
Soundings: An Exhibition in Five Parts	Candice Hopkins and Dylan Robinson	2019–22	
Actions for the Earth: Art, Care & Ecology	Sharmila Wood	2023–24	
Never Spoken Again: Rogue Stories of Science and Collections	David Ayala-Alfonso	2020–24	
Publishing Against the Grain	Independent Curators International (ICI)	2017–23	
Talking to Action: Art, Pedagogy, and Activism in the Americas	Bill Kelley Jr.	2017–19	
Axis Mundo: Queer Networks in Chicano L.A.	C. Ondine Chavoya and David Evans Frantz	2017–22	
The Ocean After Nature	Alaina Claire Feldman	2016–18	
Apichatpong Weerasethakul: The Serenity of Madness	Gridthiya Gaweewong	2016–20	
Salon de Fleurus	Salon de Fleurus	2016–18	
EN MAS': Carnival and Performance Art of the Caribbean	Claire Tancons and Krista Thompson	2015–18	
Push Play	Melissa E. Feldman	2014–17	
do it (2013-)	Hans Ulrich Obrist	2013–21	
Living as Form (The Nomadic Version)	Nato Thompson	2012–14	
State of Mind: New California Art Circa 1970	Constance M Lewallen and Karen Moss	2012–14	
Performance Now	RoseLee Goldberg	2012–15	
Project 35 Volume 2	Leeza Ahmady, Meskerem Assegued, Daina Augaitis, Defne Ayas, Regine Basha, Valerie Cassel Oliver, Rosina Cazali, Stuart Comer, Veronica Cordeiro, Christopher Cozier, María del Carmen Carrión, Rifky Effendy, Özge Ersoy, N’Goné Fall, Amirali Ghasemi, Hou Hanru, Virginija Januskeviciute, Vít Havránek, Abdellah Karroum, Sunjung Kim, Pablo León de la Barra, Maria Lind, Yandro Miralles, Srimoyee Mitra, Nat Muller, Sharmini Pereira, Nataša Petrešin-Bachelez, Kathrin Rhomberg, Mats Stjernstedt, David Teh, Philip Tinari, Christine Tohme, Raluca Voinea, Jochen Volz, and Adnan Yildiz	2012–15	
Create	Lawrence Rinder and Matthew Higgs	2011–14	
With Hidden Noise	Stephen Vitiello	2011–15	
Martha Wilson	Peter Dykhuis	2011–19	
Harald Szeemann: Documenta 5	David Platzker	2011–19	
Raymond Pettibon: The Punk Years, 1978-86	David Platzker	2010–13	
Project 35	Magalí Arriola, Ruth Auerbach, Zoe Butt, Yane Calovski, Amy Cheng, Ana Paula Cohen, Joselina Cruz, Sergio Edelsztein, Mai Abu ElDahab, Charles Esche, Lauri Firstenberg, Alexie Glass-Kantor, Julieta González, Anthony Huberman, Lu Jie, Mami Kataoka, Lars Bang Larsen, Weng Choy Lee, Constance M Lewallen, Raimundas Malasauskas, Francesco Manacorda, Chus Martínez, Viktor Misiano, David Moos, Deeksha Nath, Simon Njami, Hans Ulrich Obrist, Jack Persekian, José Roca, Bisi Silva, Franklin Sirmans, Kathryn Smith, Susan Sollins, Mirjam Varadinis, What, How & for Whom/WHW	2010–16	
People's Biennial	Jens Hoffmann and Harrell Fletcher	2010–12	
Image Transfer: Pictures in a Remix Culture	Sara Krajewski	2010–12	
The Storyteller	Claire Gilman and Margaret Sundell	2009–10	
FAX	João Ribas	2009–14	
Mixed Signals: Artists Consider Masculinity in Sports	Christopher Bedford	2009–11	
The New Normal	Michael Connor	2008–09	
Experimental Geography	Nato Thompson	2008–14	
Slightly Unbalanced	Susan Hapgood	2008–10	
Phantasmagoria	José Roca	2007–09	
Jess	Ingrid Schaffner	2007–09	
Space Is the Place	Alex Baker and Toby Kamps	2006–08	
High Times, Hard Times: New York Painting 1967–1975	Katy Siegel with David Reed as advisor	2006–08	
Beyond Green: Towards a Sustainable Art	Stephanie Smith	2005–09	
Shoot the Family	Ralph Rugoff	2006–07	
Situation Comedy: Humor in Recent Art	Dominic Molon and Michael Rooks	2005–07	
What Sound Does a Color Make?	Kathleen Forde	2005–07	
Will Boys Be Boys?: Questioning Adolescent Masculinity in Contemporary Art	Shamim M. Momin	2004–07	
Likeness: Portraits of Artists by Other Artists	Matthew Higgs	2004–06	
The Paper Sculpture Show Mary Ceruti	Matt Freedman and Sina Najafi	2003–07	
100 Artists See God	John Baldessari and Meg Cranston	2003–06	
Mark Lombardi: Global Networks	Robert Hobbs	2003–05	
UnNaturally	Mary-Kay Lombino	2003–04	
Thin Skin: The Fickle Nature of Bubbles, Spheres, and Inflatable Structures	Barbara Clausen and Carin Kuoni	2002–04	
Walk Ways	Stuart Horodner	2002–04	
The Gift: Generous Offerings, Threatening Hospitality	Antonio Somaini and Gianfranco Maraniello	2001–03	
My Reality: Contemporary Art and the Culture of Japanese Animation	Jeff Fleming and Susan Lubowsky Talbott	2001–03	
Everything Can Be Different	Maria Lind	2001–02	
Pictures, Patents, Monkeys, and More... On Collecting	Ingrid Schaffner	2001–02	
Telematic Connections: The Virtual Embrace	Steve Dietz	2001–02	
Almost Warm & Fuzzy: Childhood and Contemporary Art	Susan Lubowsky Talbott and Lea Rosson DeLong	2000–2002	
Beyond Preconceptions: The Sixties Experiment	Milena Kalinovska	2000–2002	
Painting Zero Degree	Carlos Basualdo	2000–2002	
Power of the Word	Chang Tsong-zung	1999–2002	
Irish Art Now: From the Poetic to the Political	Declan McGonagle	1999–2001	
Lee Krasner	Robert Hobbs	1999–2001	
Contemporary Art from Cuba: Irony and Survival on the Utopian Island	Marilyn Zeitlin	1998–2001	
The People's Choice	Komar and Melamid	1998–2002	
Judy Pfaff, U.S. entry to 24th São Paulo Bienal	Miranda McClintic	1998	
do it	Hans Ulrich Obrist	1997–2001	
At the Threshold of the Visible: Minuscule and Small Scale Art, 1964–1996	Ralph Rugoff	1997–99	
Making It Real	Vik Muniz	1997–99	
David Smith: Medals for Dishonor	Matthew Marks and Peter Stevens	1996–2000	
Embedded Metaphor	Nina Felshin	1996–99	
Content and Discontent in Today's Photography	Andy Grundberg	1995–97	
Critiques of Pure Abstraction	Mark Rosenthal	1995–97	
Meret Oppenheim: Beyond the Teacup	Jacqueline Burckhardt and Bice Curiger	1995–97	
Multiple Exposure: The Group Portrait in Photography	Leslie Tonkonow	1995–97	
Image and Memory: Latin American Photography, 1880–1992	Wendy Watriss	1994–96	
Monumental Propaganda Komar and Melamid	guest instigators	1994–96	
Transformers	Ralph Rugoff	1994–96	
After Perestroika: Kitchenmaids or Stateswomen	Margarita Tupitsyn	1993–95	
Empty Dress: Clothing as Surrogate in Recent Art	Nina Felshin	1993–95	
The First Generation: Women and Video,1970–1975	JoAnn Hanley	1993–95	
Dark Decor	Tina Potter and Janine Cirincione	1992–94	
Drawn in the Nineties	Joshua Smith	1992–94	
From Media to Metaphor: Art About AIDS	Robert Atkins and Thomas W. Sokolowski	1992–93	
Good Stories, Well Told: Video Art for Young Audiences	Robin White	1992–94	
Departures: Photography, 1923–1990	Edmund Yankov	1991–93	
No Laughing Matter	Nina Felshin	1991–93	
Contemporary Illustrated Books: Word and Image, 1967–1988	Donna Stein	1990–91	
Eye for I: Video Self-Portraits	Raymond Bellour	1990–92	
Imágenes Líricas/New Spanish Visions	Lucinda Barnes	1990–92	
Points of Departure: Origins in Video	Jacqueline Kain	1990–91	
Team Spirit	Susan Sollins and Nina Sundell	1990–92	
Through the Path of Echoes: Contemporary Art in Mexico	Elizabeth Ferrer	1990–92	
A Different War: Vietnam in Art	Lucy Lippard	1989–92	
Eternal Metaphors: New Art from Italy	Susan Sollins	1989–92	
The Presence of Absence: New Installations	Nina Felshin	1989–93	
Acceptable Entertainment	Paul Laster and Renée Riccardo	1988–90	
Hybrid Neutral: Modes of Abstraction and the Social	Tricia Collins and Richard Milazzo	1988–90	
Line and Image: The Northern Sensibility in Recent European Drawing	Peter Frank	1988–89	
The Analytical Theatre: New Art from Britain	Milena Kalinovska and Michael Newman	1987–88	
Ancient Inspirations: Six Figurative Sculptors	Judith Olch Richards	1987–88	
Modern Redux: Critical Alternatives for Architecture in the Next Decade	Douglas Davis	1987–88	
Morality Tales: History Painting in the 1980s	Thomas W. Sokolowski	1987–89	
The Success of Failure	Joel Fisher	1987–88	
After Matisse Tiffany Bell	Irving Sandler and Susan Sollins	1986–88	
Video Transformations Lois Bianchi		1986–88	
The American Experience: Contemporary Immigrant Artists	Cynthia Jaffee McCabe	1985–86	
Large Drawings	Elke Solomon	1985	
Points of View: Four Painters	Susan Sollins	1985–86	
Tradition and Conflict: Images from a Turbulent Decade, 1963–1973	Mary Schmidt Campbell	1985–87	
Drawings: After Photography	William Olander	1984–86	
From the Collection of Sol LeWitt	Andrea Miller-Keller and John Ravenal	1984–86	
Indiana Influence – Part I	William H. Gerdts	1984	
Indiana Influence – Part II	Peter Frank	1984	
Verbally Charged Images	Nina Felshin	1984–86	
Concepts in Construction: 1910–1980	Irving Sandler	1983–85	
New Sculpture: Icon and Environment	Susan Sollins	1983–84	
Sculpture from Germany	Michael Klein	1983–85	
The End of the Road: Vanishing Highway Architecture in America	John Margolies	1982–84	
Texas on Paper	Cheryl A. Brutvan and Linda L. Cathcart	1982–84	
Art Materialized: Selections from the Fabric Workshop	Michael Quigley	1981–84	
CAPS/ICI Traveling Video Festival	Nina Sundell	1981–84	
Ezra Stoller: Architectural Photographs		1981–83	
Mapped Art: Charts, Routes, Regions	Peter Frank	1981–83	
Metropolitan Container of Art		1981	
Some Color Photographs	Marvin Heiferman	1980	
American Images: New Work by Twenty Contemporary Photographers	Renato Danese	1979–84	
Collaborations and Amplifications	Elke Solomon	1979	
Masks Visiting Artists Collaborative		1979–81	
The Photograph as Artifice	Constance Glenn	1979–80	
Supershow!	Susan Sollins and Elke Solomon	1979–80	
Artists’ Books U.S.A.	Peter Frank and Martha Wilson	1978–79	
Numerals: Mathematical Concepts in Contemporary Art	Rainer Crone	1978–79	
The Sense of Self: From Self-Portrait to Autobiography	Nina Sundell	1978–80	
The City Project	Susan Sollins	1977	
New Work/New York	Susan Sollins	1977–78	
American Pop Art and the Culture of the Sixties	Nina Sundell	1976	
Art in Landscape	Susan Sollins	1976–77	
Language and Structure in North America	Richard Kostelanetz	1976	
MC=E2		1976–77	
Photography: A Representative Survey	John R. Gossage	1976–78	
Ralph Eugene Meatyard: A Retrospective	Van Deren Coke	1976–79	
Video Art U.S.A., U.S. entry to 1976 São Paulo Bienal	Jack Bolton	1975	
