= Susan Deer Cloud =

Susan Deer Cloud (born October 20, 1950) is an American writer of poetry, fiction, and creative essays. Previously she had work published under a former married name of Susan Clements.

== Biography ==
Deer Cloud, born to Joseph R. Hauptfleisch and Dorothea Mae Lare in Livingston Manor, New York, grew up in the Borscht Belt. She received her B.A. in General Literature and Creative Writing (summa cum laude) and M.A. in English Literature and Creative Writing from Binghamton University. She has an MFA in creative writing from Goddard College.

Hauptfleisch-Clements is not an enrolled member of any indigenous tribe despite claims of indigenous heritage.

== Work and achievements ==
Deer Cloud resides in the Catskill Mountains. She has taught Creative Writing at Binghamton University, ranging from introductory poetry and fiction courses to upper level poetry courses, as well as Composition at Broome Community College. She works as a full-time writer who gives poetry readings, talks and workshops at colleges and other venues.

Deer Cloud is the recipient of two New York State Foundation for the Arts Poetry Fellowships, an Elizabeth George Foundation Grant, a Chenango County Council for the Arts Grant, and a National Endowment for the Arts Fellowship in Literature (Poetry).

She has received Prairie Schooner's Readers’ Choice Award and has twice been given First Prize in the Allen Ginsberg Poetry Competition. She founded and hosted readings and performances with a group of writers, artists and musicians called Binghamton's Underground Poets, Wild Indians & Exuberant Others, Unc. (Unincorporated), and edited a multicultural anthology Confluence containing work by Underground participants. She is also editor of the ongoing Re-Matriation Series of Indigenous Poetry for FootHills Publishing.

== Bibliography ==
- Before Language. Shabda Press 2016/
- Hunger Moon. Shabda Press 2014.
- Fox Mountain Poems. FootHills Publishing 2013.
- I WAS INDIAN (Before Being Indian Was Cool): An Anthology of Indigenous Poetry, Volume II, edited by Susan Deer Cloud. FootHills Publishing 2012.
- Braiding Starlight. Split Oak Press 2010.
- I WAS INDIAN (Before Being Indian Was Cool): an Anthology of Indigenous Poetry, Volume I, edited by Susan Deer Cloud. FootHills Publishing 2009.
- Car Stealer. FootHills Publishing. 2009.
- The Last Ceremony. Foothills Publishing. 2007.
- Confluence. Anthology, edited by Deer Cloud. Foothills Publishing, 2006.
- In The Moon When The Deer Lose Their Horns. Chantry Press, Midland, NJ. 1993.
- The Broken Hoop. Blue Cloud Press, Marvin, SD. 1988.
