= Mathieu Lafon =

French footballer (born 1984)

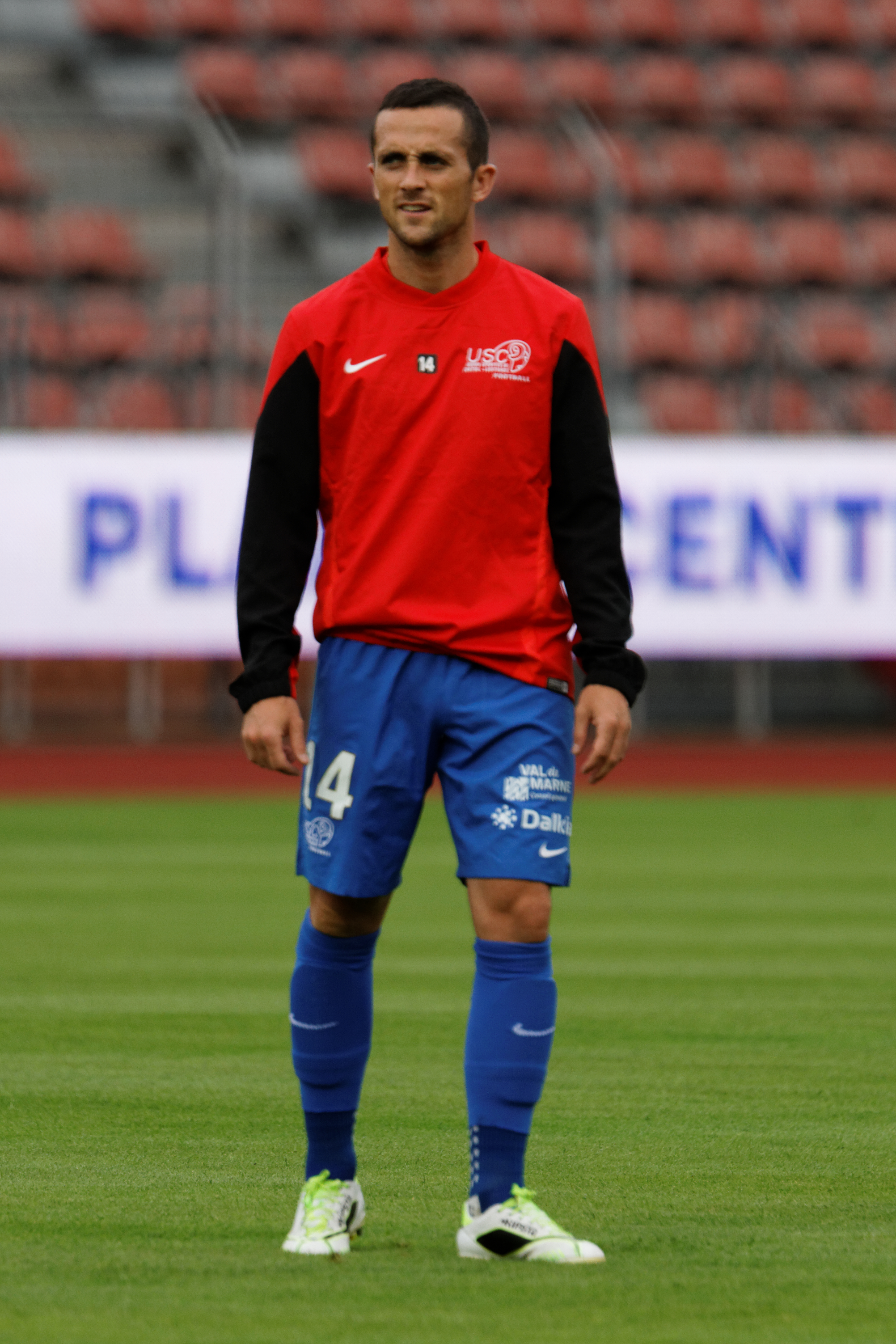

Personal information
- Date of birth: 1 March 1984 (age 42)
- Place of birth: Montpellier, France
- Height: 1.70 m (5 ft 7 in)
- Position: Midfielder

Senior career*
Years	Team	Apps	(Gls)
2002–2007	Montpellier B		
2003–2007	Montpellier	29	(0)
2007–2011	Évian		
2011–2016	Créteil	123	(2)
2016–2017	Grenoble	7	(0)
- * Club domestic league appearances and goals

Mathieu Lafon (born 1 March 1984) is a French former professional football player.

He played on the professional level in Ligue 1 and Ligue 2 for Montpellier HSC.
