= Administrator of an estate =

Person appointed to manage an intestate person's estate

The administrator of an estate is a legal term referring to a person appointed by a court to administer the estate of a deceased person who left no will. Where a person dies intestate, i.e., without a will, the court may appoint a person to settle their debts, pay any necessary taxes and funeral expenses, and distribute the remainder according to the procedure set down by law. Such a person is known as the administrator of the estate and will enjoy similar powers to those of an executor under a will.

== Overview ==
Once an individual dies, their estate must pass through the estate process. This process, conducted in a state or local probate court, involves the disposition of the decedent's estate either by will or intestacy. Often, to facilitate this process, the Court will appoint an Administrator of the Estate. The Court tasks this administrator with managing the decedent's estate—which includes collecting the decedent's assets, paying off all necessary debts, and distributing the remains to the decedent's heirs. However, these Administrators do not hold unlimited responsibilities but rather derive all of their power solely from the probate court. Thus, once the Administrator properly disposes of the estate, their role ceases to exist.

== Administrator eligibility ==
A court will appoint an estate administrator only when either the decedent died without a will, the decedent failed to name an executor in their will, or a named executor is unable or unwilling to perform their duties. Generally, while any person may serve as an Administrator of an Estate, probate courts are limited by state statute or common law as to whom they may select. Some of the most common restrictions will be provided below. So although the information below provides general overview of general formalities, it's best to consult a particular state's relevant statutes for further guidance.

=== Preferred parties ===
In some states, statute requires probate courts to appoint an administrator from a selected "preferred party list." A preferred party could range from the decedent's surviving widow to a surviving cousin. To provide an example, see the District of Columbia's preferred party statute: "If the intestate leave[s] a widow or surviving husband and a child or children, administration, subject to the discretion of the court, should be granted either to the widow or surviving husband or to the child, or one or more of the children qualified to act as Administrator." While some states allow probate courts to stray from this preferred list, most are required to pick from the restricted pool unless all preferred parties waive the right to be administrator.

=== Competency of an administrator ===
Before an Administrator may be appointed, they must first be determined competent. This competency, no different from competency in other legal matters, derived from the common law's requirement that administrators be free from any mental condition that would impair their ability to serve the best interests of the estate. Today, almost all states adopt this common law standard with some extending its boundaries to include physical impairments as well.

However, a Court cannot base their competency determination on general factors such as age or mobility. Rather, the Court or a petition party must establish specific mental or physical impairments that will almost certainly impair the administrator's judgement (things such as dementia, cerebral palsy, or a traumatic brain injury).

=== Adversely interested parties ===
Probate courts may refuse to appoint individuals as administrators if they possess an adverse interest to the estate. The exact definition of an "adverse interest" falls entirely on a strict case-by-case factual inquiry. For instance, generally, the fact that an individual also serves as a beneficiary of an estate does not bar them from serving as an administrator. Instead, courts are required to assess all circumstances regarding an administrator's adverse interest and determine whether these interests are egregious enough to require disqualification. While not representative of a de facto rule, many state courts found the following circumstances egregiously adverse: Parties who actively contest a will cannot serve as administrators; Parties asserting ownership of real or personal property cannot serve as administrators; Parties involved in other litigation regarding the decedent's estate cannot serve as administrators.

=== Strangers to the estate ===
While courts may be disposed to approve preferred parties of the estate, they are generally not limited from appointing "strangers" of the estate. Courts generally define "stranger" of an estate as an individual unrelated, by either blood or marriage, to the decedent and one without any interest in the decedent's estate. Judges and scholars view these "strangers" as more desirable administrators because they, unlike preferred parties, will not be influenced in their decision-making by any personal interest. Regardless, outside a statutory preferred-party requirement, probate courts are free to appoint any "stranger" as an estate administrator.

While this may not demonstrate an exhaustive list of all statutory limitations on the appointment of administrators, they represent a thread of common factors probate courts must review in their appointment decisions.

== Powers of an administrator ==
Generally, administrators possess a wide range of powers when disposing of a decedent's estate. These include: collection of assets, payment of debts to creditors, sale of real estate/personal property, and final disposition of assets to heirs. Some of the most common and vital powers an administrator holds are:

=== Collection of an estate's assets ===
Once appointed by the court, an administrator must first collect all of a decedent's assets and prepare an inventory for the probate court. This inventory includes all real and personal property owned by the decedent, remaining balances in banking accounts, 401ks, insurance payments, and much more. Once the administrator properly submits this inventory before the probate court, they may proceed into paying creditors, settling remaining debts, and eventually disposing of the assets to the appropriate heirs.

=== Payments to creditors ===
After properly inventorying the estate, an administrator must then pay all creditors of the decedent's estate. But, the administrator does not actively seek out the decedent's creditors. Rather, after moving through the proper channels of probate court, creditors will attach their claims to the decedent's estate. After the claim attaches, the probate court (and the administrator) will filter through the claims to determine if any are improper. If improper, the claim will be "thrown out" and not charged against the estate. If deemed proper, the administrator will be required to pay the debt out of the estate's assets—which they've already inventoried. If any assets remain after payments to creditors, the balance will be distributed amongst the decedent's heirs (as described below).

=== Filing paperwork to the probate court ===
In addition to filing the inventory, administrators must submit a wide array of paperwork to properly administer a decedent's estate. For instance, in New Jersey, an administrator must file the decedent's will (if they have one), affidavits of surviving spouses regarding the existence of a will, affidavits of existing real property, deeds of distribution, applications for administration, and much more. Often, the required paperwork varies from state to state, so an administrator must check their local jurisdiction—or contact a local attorney—to confirm the requirements under state law.

=== Sale of real estate and personal property ===
Dependent on the jurisdiction, administrators hold the power to both sell and lease a decedent's real and personal property. For instance, a decedent may request the deed of their apartment building be transferred to their surviving spouse. But before that transfer, the apartment building remains functioning and must be tended to by the administrator. And so, under the title, an administrator may continue to lease that property and collect disbursements of rent until they properly transfer the deed. In addition, an administrator may sell the building, after approval from the probate court, to pay any remaining debts on the decedent's estate.

=== Disposition of assets to heirs ===
After inventorying the estate and paying all creditors, an administrator is now able to close the estate and disburse the remaining assets to the decedent's heirs. If the decedent died with a will, the administrator will disburse the assets as requested by the decedent. If the decedent died without a will, then the administrator must disburse the assets according to state or federal statute. For instance, under the New Jersey Intestacy statute, the decedent's estate must be distributed entirely to a decedent's surviving spouse. Either way, the administrator must disburse the assets according to either a will or intestacy law; they do not retain full discretion to disburse as they please.

Regardless of the actions an administrator wants to take, they should always consult a local probate court or attorney regarding their jurisdictions requirements and powers.

== Removal of an administrator ==
An administrator of an estate may always be removed either by petition or appeal. For instance, once a Court appoints an Administrator, any interested party may appeal the court's appointment. The appeal, of course, must possess merit; the party may cite improper judgement by the Court or claim another individual possessed mandatory entitlement to appointment. Either way, an appellate court always holds the power to reverse any administrator appointment made by the probate court.

Outside the appeals process, an administrator may always be removed for failure to fulfill their statutory duties. For instance, an administrator possesses a fiduciary duty to obtain the highest price for the sale of the estate's property. Were an administrator to sell property at below market value to a close friend, they could be removed as administrator for failing their fiduciary duty (i.e., failing to obtain the highest price for sale). In short, a court may always remove an administrator after it determines an administrator failed to satisfy their statutory or fiduciary duties.
