= Administration of Muslim Law Act =

Statute of the Parliament of Singapore

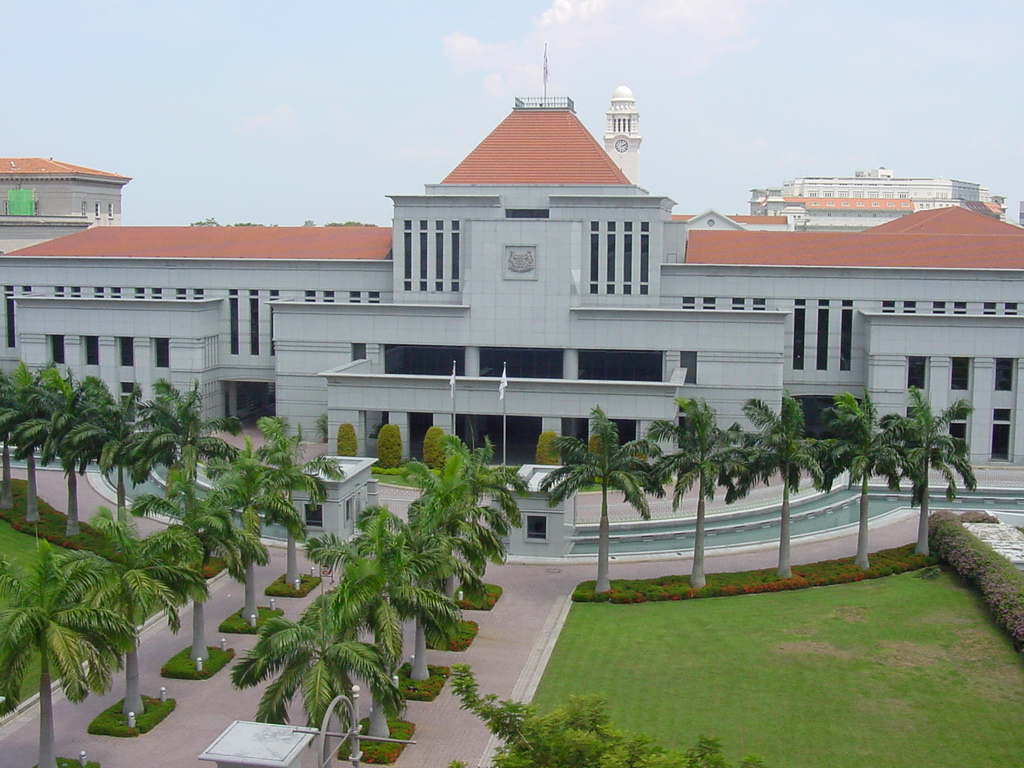

Parliament of Singapore
- Long title: An Act relating to Muslims and to make provision for regulating Muslim religious affairs and to constitute a council to advise on matters relating to the Muslim religion in Singapore and a Syariah Court.
- Citation: Administration of Muslim Law Act 1966
- Considered by: Parliament of Singapore
- Enacted by: President Yusof Ishak
- Commenced: 1 July 1968

Legislative history
- Bill title: Protection from Online Falsehoods and Manipulation Bill
- Bill citation: Bill 10 of 2019
- Introduced by: Mr Othman bin Wok (Minister for Culture and Social Affairs)
- First reading: 13 December 1965
- Second reading: 30 December 1965
- Third reading: 17 August 1966
- Committee report: The Administration Of Muslim Law Bill

Repeals
- Muslims Ordinance, 1957
- Status: Amended

The Administration of Muslim Law Act is a Singapore statute that pertains to regulation of Muslim religious affairs, establishing the creation of a religious council to offer advice on matters related to the Muslim religion, and the creation of a Syariah Court in Singapore. The act was passed in 1966 and came into force on 1 July 1968.

== History ==
=== Background ===
When Singapore became a crown colony in 1867, administration of Muslims religious matters received attention by the Colonial Office in London. During this period, Muslims in Singapore had their own judicial system that involved marriage, divorce and other civil affairs, regulated by the colonial government.

In 1877, 143 influential Muslims brought a petition for a religious functionary, also known as the Qadi, to appoint as the Muslim marriage registrar. These Muslims highlighted the importance of a proper recording system for Muslim Marriages, and there were multiple instances of Muslim families being cheated by 'Qadis' who did not turn up on the wedding date. Attorney-General Roland Braddell drafted a bill to raise the issue of the English law's impact on the Muslim community in Singapore, and introducing this new law would be helpful to the Muslim community. This led to the Mahomedan Marriage Ordinance V 1880, which states the laws and regulations on Muslim marriage and divorce, under the control of the State Governor. The ordinance gave a legal framework for Muslim religious affairs.

In 1915, the Mohamed Advisory Board was formed, expanding their scope to "religious affairs, customs, health and conditions." The board was renamed as the Muslim Advisory Board in 1945. The board continued to work after the Mohamed Advisory Board, advising the Government on matters regarding the Muslim community in Singapore, and matters that needed the regard of the Muslim community's point of view.

In 1957, while Singapore was under self-rule, the Singapore Legislative Assembly established the Syariah Court through the Muslim Ordinance. The Court claimed jurisdiction of cases whereby both parties were Muslim who were involved in matrimonial disputes.

=== Centralised Islamic authority ===
The idea of a centralised authority, a Majlis, was developing over in the Malay states. Talks about a centralised governing body in Singapore started in 1948, calling for the creation of a new centralised Muslim authority or enabling a currently existing organisation to represent Muslims in Singapore. In 1960, four Muslim organisations – Muslim Advisory Board, All-Malaya Muslim Missionary Society, Singapore Religious Teachers' Association and the Mohammadiah Movement – voiced out the need to create a centralised authority that "unites all sections of the Muslim community." Ahmad bin Ibrahim, Singapore's State Advocate General at that time, headed this movement.

=== 1952-1968: Administration of Muslim Law Bill ===
In 1952, the Administration of Muslim Law Enactment was passed in Selangor. This legislation incorporated the Qadi and the Shariah Court, and the legislation of a religious council. Many other Malay states followed suit, including Singapore. Ahmad drafted the Administration of Muslim Law Bill.

In 1960, Minister of Labour and Law K. M. Byrne moved the Bill to the Singapore Legislative Assembly. The aim of the bill was to restructure the organisations and matters pertaining to the Muslim religion and law, following the administration of the law in other Malayan states. This bill was introduced to replace the Muslim Ordinance 1957, strengthen the Shariah court and establish the Majlis Ugama Islam Singapura (MUIS). The bill also enabled the Yang di-Pertuan Negara of Singapore to appoint a head for the Majlis, a Mufti, a maximum of two Muslim people in the Legislative Assembly and a minimum of 10 people to form the Majlis committee.

The Law Minister established a Select Committee in 1961, providing a platform for the public to submit written representations regarding the bill. The Majlis's scope of authority was the only matter up for debate. These representations have indicated that the Majlis should expand their duties, especially about wakaf. Those who did not agree with the bill noted that it was not right for a secular government to pass legislation governing, regulating, and governing Islam.

In September 1963, Singapore became part of the Federation of Malaysia. Muslim religious matters in these states were under Malaysia's Head of State because there was no Malay Sultan. Ahmad had to edit the Bill to adapt to these changes. However, Singapore separated from the federation on 9 August 1965.

On 30 December 1965, the Administration of Muslim Law Bill was introduced for the second time in Parliament by Minister for Culture and Social Affairs, Othman Wok. The bill aimed to "repeal and re-enact law relating to Muslims and to make provision for regulating Muslim religious affairs and to constitute a Council to advise on matters relating to the Muslim religion."

Othman read the bill for the third time on 17 August 1966. He reiterated that the implementation of AMLA will have no personal, sectional or political influences on the Majlis, assuring that the Majlis will prioritise the interests of the Muslim community in Singapore. The bill was passed later on. However, AMLA was only established officially on 1 July 1968 after finding suitable candidates for the Majlis President, Mufti and Secretary.

== Functions of the law ==
The enactment of the AMLA created three major institutions: the Majlis Ugama Islam Singapura (MUIS), the Syariah Court, and the Registry of Muslim Marriages (ROMM).

=== Majlis Ugama Islam Singapura (MUIS) ===
MUIS has several key responsibilities mentioned in Section 5, which include:

1. Managing zakat, wakaf (endowment), pilgrimage affairs, halal certification, and other initiatives that pertain to the socio-religious aspects of Muslim life in Singapore.
2. Overseeing the construction, development, management, and administration of mosques.
3. Developing and managing Islamic education and madrasahs.
4. Providing religious guidance to the community through various means.

=== Syariah Court ===
With the enactment of AMLA, the Muslim Ordinance 1957 was repealed. The Syariah Court possesses the authority to adjudicate all cases and proceedings that involve solely Muslim parties or those who were wedded under Muslim law, and pertain to conflicts related to marriage and divorce.

Two changes were made in 1999 and 2009. In 1999, AMLA was amended to heighten the authority of the Court as well as to provide more support to the Court to handle its backlog. In 2009, AMLA made the processes simpler for Muslims to implement rulings issued by the Syariah Court. If there is a violation of Syariah Court orders, people have the option to file a Magistrate's complaint at the District Court.

=== Registration of Muslim Marriages ===
Previously, the registration of Muslim marriages and divorces were handled by the Syariah Court. Under the AMLA, marriages conducted according to Muslim law and the annulment of divorces involving both Muslim parties are recognized.

In 1978, the management of Muslim marriages was under the authority of the Registry of Muslim Marriages.
