= Probate =

Proving of a will

In common law jurisdictions, probate is the judicial process whereby a will is "proved" in a court of law and accepted as a valid public document that is the true last testament of the deceased; or whereby, in the absence of a legal will, the estate is settled according to the laws of intestacy that apply in the jurisdiction where the deceased resided at the time of their death.

The granting of probate is the first step in the legal process of administering the estate of a deceased person, resolving all claims and distributing the deceased person's property under a will. A probate court decides the legal validity of a testator's (deceased person's) will and grants its approval, also known as granting probate, to the executor. The probated will then becomes a legal instrument that may be enforced by the executor in the law courts if necessary. A probate also officially appoints the executor (or personal representative), generally named in the will, as having legal power to dispose of the testator's assets in the manner specified in the testator's will. Concurrent through the probate process, a will may be contested.

== Terminology ==
=== Executor ===
An executor is a person appointed by a will to act on behalf of the estate of the will-maker (the "testator") upon their death. An executor is the legal personal representative of a deceased person's estate. The appointment of an executor only becomes effective after the death of the testator. After the testator dies, the person named in the will as executor can decline or renounce the position, and if so should quickly notify the probate court accordingly.

Executors "step into the shoes" of the deceased and have similar rights and powers to wind up the personal affairs of the deceased. This may include continuing or filing lawsuits that the deceased was entitled to bring, making claims for wrongful death, paying off creditors, or selling or disposing of assets not particularly gifted in the will, among others. But the role of the executor is to resolve the testator's estate and to distribute the estate to the beneficiaries or those otherwise entitled.

Sometimes, in England and Wales, a professional executor is named in the will – not a family member but (for example) a solicitor, bank or other financial institution. Professional executors will charge the estate for carrying out duties related to the administration of the estate; this can leave the family facing additional costs. It is possible to get a professional executor to renounce their role, meaning they will have no part in dealing with the estate; or to reserve their power, which means the remaining executors will carry out the related duties, but without the involvement of the professional executor.

=== Administrator ===
When a person dies without a will then the legal personal representative is known as the "administrator".

This is commonly the closest relative, although that person can renounce their right to be administrator, in which case the right moves to the next closest relative. This often happens when parents or grandparents are first in line to become the administrator but renounce their rights on the grounds that they are elderly, do not possess knowledge of estate law, or feel that someone else is better suited to the task.

The appointment of an administrator follows a codified list establishing priority appointees. Classes of persons named higher on the list receive priority of appointment to those lower on the list. Although relatives of the deceased frequently receive priority over all others, creditors of the deceased and 'any other citizen [of that jurisdiction]' may act as an administrator if there is some cognizable reason or relationship to the estate. Alternatively, if no other person qualifies or no other person accepts appointment, the court will appoint a representative from the local public administrator's office.

=== Etymology ===
The English noun "probate" derives directly from the Latin verb probare, to try, test, prove, examine, more specifically from the verb's past participle nominative neuter probatum, "having been proved". Historically during many centuries a paragraph in Latin of standard format was written by scribes of the particular probate court below the transcription of the will, commencing with the words (for example): Probatum Londini fuit huiusmodi testamentum coram venerabili viro (name of approver) legum doctore curiae prerogativae Cantuariensis... ("A testament of such a kind was proved at London in the presence of the venerable man ..... doctor of law at the Prerogative Court of Canterbury...") The earliest usage of the English word was in 1463, defined as "the official proving of a will". The term "probative", used in the law of evidence, comes from the same Latin root but has a different English usage.

== Probate process ==
Probate is a process of improvement that proves a will of a deceased person is valid, so their property can in due course be retitled (US terminology) or transferred to beneficiaries of the will. As with any legal proceeding, there are technical aspects to probate administration:

- Creditors must be notified and legal notices published.
- Executors of the will must be guided in how and when to distribute assets and how to take creditors' rights into account.
- A petition to appoint a personal representative may need to be filed and letters of administration (often referred to as "letters testamentary") issued. A Grant of Letters of Administration can be used as proof that the 'Administrator' is entitled to handle the assets.
- Homestead property, which follows its own set of unique rules in states like Florida, must be dealt with separately from other assets. In many common law jurisdictions such as Canada, parts of the US, the UK, Australia and India, any jointly owned property passes automatically to the surviving joint owner separately from any will, unless the equitable title is held as tenants in common.
- There are time factors involved in filing and objecting to claims against the estate.
- There may be a lawsuit pending over the decedent's death or there may have been pending suits that are now continuing. There may be separate procedures required in contentious probate cases.
- Real estate or other property may need to be sold to effect the correct distribution of assets pursuant to the will, or merely to pay debts.
- Estate taxes, gift taxes or inheritance taxes must be considered if the estate exceeds certain thresholds.
- Costs of the administration including ordinary taxation such as income tax on interest and property taxation are deducted from assets in the estate before distribution by the executors of the will.
- Other assets may simply need to be transferred from the deceased to their beneficiaries, such as life insurance. Other assets may have pay on death or transfer on death designations, which avoids probate.
- The rights of beneficiaries must be respected, in terms of providing proper and adequate notice, making timely distribution of estate assets, and otherwise administering the estate properly and efficiently.

Local laws governing the probate process often depend on the value and complexity of the estate. If the value of the estate is relatively small, the probate process may be avoided. In some jurisdictions and/or at a certain threshold, probate must be applied for by the executor/administrator or a probate lawyer filing on their behalf.

A probate lawyer offers services in probate court, and may be retained to open an estate or offer service during the course of probate proceedings on behalf of the administrator or executor of the estate. Probate lawyers may also represent heirs, creditors and other parties who have a legal interest in the outcome of the estate.

In common law jurisdictions, probate ("official proving of a will") is obtained by executors of a will while letters of administration are granted where there are no executors.

== Australia ==
In Australia, probate can refer to the process of proving the will of a deceased person and also to a grant of probate, the legal document that is obtained.

There is a Supreme Court probate registry in each jurisdiction that deals with probate applications. However, each state and territory has slightly different laws and processes in relation to probate. The main probate legislation is as follows:

- New South Wales—Probate and Administration Act 1898.
- Victoria—Administration and Probate Act 1958.
- Queensland—Uniform Civil Procedure Rules 1999 and Succession Act 1981.
- Western Australia—Non‑contentious Probate Rules 1967.
- South Australia—Administration and Probate Act 1919.
- Tasmania—Administration and Probate Act 1935.
- Australian Capital Territory—Administration and Probate Act 1929.
- Northern Territory—Administration and Probate Act 1993.

=== Application for grant of probate ===
Probate is required if the deceased person owned real property or if their other assets are above the threshold amount, which is usually $50,000 for major banks and lower thresholds for other financial institutions. Assets that had been “owned jointly” (but not assets held “in common”) pass automatically to the other joint owner and do not form part of the deceased estate. Also, benefits from life insurance on the deceased paid directly to a nominee are not part of the estate, nor are trust assets held by the deceased as trustee.

Applications for probate are made to the probate office in the jurisdiction with which the deceased has a close connection, not necessarily where the person died. Normally, only the executor of a will can apply for a grant of probate, and it is their duty to obtain probate in a timely manner. Executors can apply for probate themselves (which is often done to reduce legal fees) or be represented by a lawyer. With the application for probate, the applicant must also provide the original of the will, an official death certificate (not the one issued by a medical professional), a copy of the death notice and a statement of the known assets and liabilities of the deceased estate. The applicant may also be required to have published a notice in a major newspaper of an intention to make the application for probate.

=== Distribution of estate ===
After probate is granted, executors are empowered to deal with estate assets, including selling and transferring assets, for the benefit of the beneficiaries. For some transactions, an executor may be required to produce a copy of the probate as proof of authority to deal with property still in the name of the deceased person, as is invariably the case with the transfer or conveyance of land. Executors are also responsible for paying creditors and for distributing the residual assets in accordance with the will. Some Australian jurisdictions require a notice of intended distribution to be published before the estate is distributed.

== Canada ==
Inheritance law in Canada is constitutionally a provincial matter. Therefore, the laws governing inheritance in Canada is legislated by each individual province.

=== Ontario ===
The probate process in Ontario is a legal process where a court approves the validity of a will and grants authority to the executor named in the will to distribute the deceased person's assets according to the instructions in the will. The process generally involves the following steps:

- The executor applies for a certificate of appointment of estate trustee (probate) from the court, along with the original will and any required supporting documents.
- The court reviews the application and if satisfied that the will is valid and that the executor is suitable, it will issue a certificate of appointment of estate trustee.
- The executor uses the certificate to gather and manage the deceased person's assets, pay any debts and taxes, and distribute the assets according to the instructions in the will.
- The executor must provide an inventory of the assets and liabilities of the estate and file it with the court and distribute the assets to the beneficiaries according to the Will.
- The executor must also file an estate information return with the Ministry of Finance within 90 days of being issued the certificate of appointment of estate trustee.
- Once the assets have been distributed and any debts have been paid, the executor will apply for a certificate of final distribution from the court, which will release the executor from their responsibilities.

== United Kingdom ==
=== England and Wales ===
The main source of English law is the Wills Act 1837. Probate, as with the law of family settlements (trusts), was handled by the Court of Chancery. When that court was abolished in 1873, their jurisdiction passed to the Chancery Division of the High Court.

==== Definition ====
When someone dies, the term "probate" usually refers to the legal process whereby the deceased's assets are collected together and, following various legal and fiscal steps and processes, eventually distributed to the beneficiaries of the estate. Technically the term has a particular legal meaning, but it is generally used within the English legal profession as a term to cover all procedures concerned with the administration of a deceased person's estate. As a legal discipline the subject is vast and it is only possible in an article such as this to cover the most common situations, but even that only scratches the surface.

==== Jurisdiction ====
All legal procedures concerned with probate (as defined above) come within the jurisdiction of the Chancery Division of the High Court of Justice by virtue of Section 25 of the Senior Courts Act 1981. The High Court is, therefore, the only body able to issue documents that confer on someone the ability to deal with a deceased person's estate—close bank accounts or sell property. It is the production and issuing of these documents, known collectively as grants of representation, that is the primary function of the Probate Registries, which are part of the High Court, which the general public and probate professionals alike apply to for grants of representation.

==== Grants of representation ====
There are many different types of grants of representation, each one designed to cover a particular circumstance. The most common cover the two most common situations—either the deceased died leaving a valid will or they did not. If someone left a valid will, it is more than likely that the grant is a grant of probate. If there was no will, the grant required is likely to be a grant of administration. There are many other grants that can be required in certain circumstances, and many have technical Latin names, but the general public is most likely to encounter grants of probate or administration. If an estate has a value of less than £5,000.00 or if all assets are held jointly and therefore pass by survivorship, for example to a surviving spouse, a grant is not usually required.

===== Applying for a grant =====
A will includes the appointment of an executor or executors. One of their duties is to apply to the Probate Division of the High Court for a grant of probate. An executor can apply to a local probate registry for a grant themselves but most people use a probate practitioner such as a solicitor. If an estate is small, some banks and building societies allow the deceased's immediate family to close accounts without a grant, but there usually must be less than about £15,000 in the account for this to be permitted.

==== Asset distribution ====
The persons who are actually given the job of dealing with the deceased's assets are called "personal representatives" or "PRs". If the deceased left a valid will, the PRs are the "executors" appointed by the will—"I appoint X and Y to be my executors etc." If there is no will or if the will does not contain a valid appointment of executors (for example if they are all dead) then the PRs are called "administrators". So, executors obtain a grant of probate that permits them to deal with the estate and administrators obtain a grant of administration that lets them do the same. Apart from that distinction, the function of executors and administrators is exactly the same.

==== Probate requirements ====
A requirement of the probate process is the valuation of the estate.

==== Intestacy probate process ====
For an explanation of the intestacy probate process in England and Wales, see Administration (probate law).

==== Contesting the circumstances of a will's creation ====
An applicant may challenge the validity of a person's will after they have died by lodging a caveat and requisite fee at the probate registry. This prevents anyone from obtaining a grant of probate for that person's estate for six months, which the applicant can shortly before that point apply to extend. A caveat is not to be used to extend the time for bringing a claim for financial provision from a person's estate, such as under the Inheritance (Provision for Family and Dependants) Act 1975. The court can order costs against an applicant using a caveat for that purpose.

To challenge the caveat, the intended executor sends a completed "warning" form to the probate registry. This document will be sent to the person who entered the caveat, and for the caveat to remain, they will have to enter an appearance at the probate registry. This is not a physical appearance; it is a further document to send to the probate registry within eight days of receiving the warning.

=== Scotland ===
The equivalent to probate in Scotland is confirmation, although there are considerable differences between the two systems because of the separate Scottish legal system. Appointment as an executor does not in itself grant authority to ingather and distribute the estate of the deceased; the executor(s) must make an application to the sheriff court for a grant of confirmation. This is a court order authorising them to "uplift, receive, administer and dispose of the estate and to act in the office of executor". A grant or certificate of confirmation gives the executor(s) authority to uplift money or other property belonging to a deceased person (e.g. from a bank), and to administer and distribute it according to either the deceased's will or the law on intestacy.

== United States ==
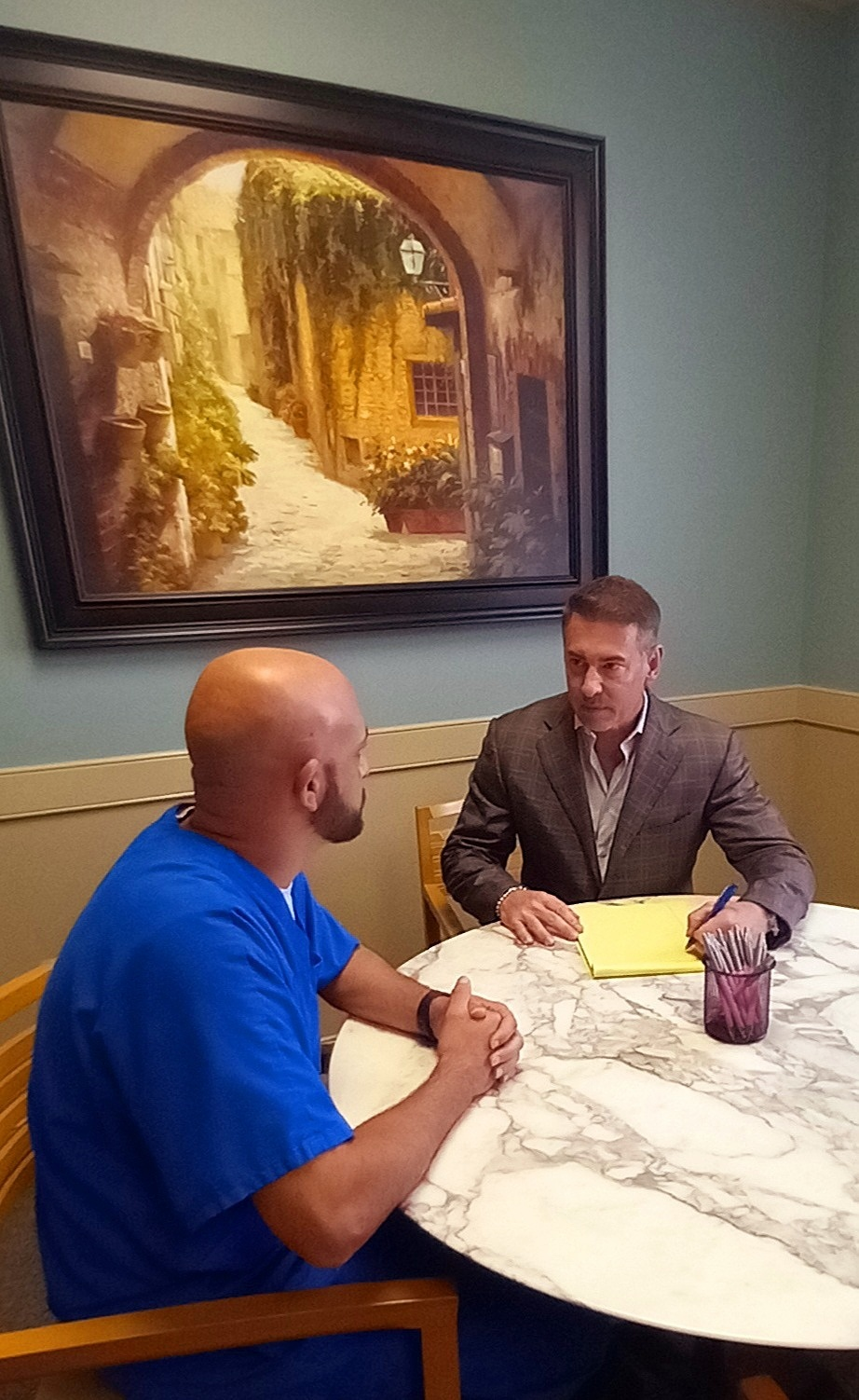
An attorney meets with client for estate planning.

Most estates in the United States include property that is subject to probate proceedings. If the property of an estate is not automatically devised to a surviving spouse or heir through principles of joint ownership or survivorship, or otherwise by operation of law, and was not transferred to a trust during the decedent's lifetime, it is generally necessary to "probate the estate", whether or not the decedent had a valid will. For example, life insurance and retirement accounts with properly completed beneficiary designations should avoid probate, as will most bank accounts titled jointly or made payable on death.

Some states have procedures that allow for the transfer of assets from small estates through affidavit or through a simplified probate process. For example, California has a "Small Estate Summary Procedure" to allow the summary transfer of a decedent's asset without a formal probate proceeding. The dollar limit by which the small estate procedure can be effectuated was $150,000 before a statutory increase was implemented on a three-year schedule, arriving at $184,500 by April 2022.

For estates that do not qualify for simplified proceedings, a court having jurisdiction of the decedent's estate (a probate court) supervises the probate process to ensure administration and disposition of the decedent's property is conducted in accord with the law of that jurisdiction, and in a manner consistent with decedent's intent as manifested in his will. Distribution of certain estate assets may require selling assets, including real estate.

=== Avoiding probate ===
Some of the decedent's property may never enter probate because it passes to another person contractually, such as the death proceeds of an insurance policy insuring the decedent or bank or retirement account that names a beneficiary or is owned as "payable on death", and property (sometimes a bank or brokerage account) legally held as "jointly owned with right of survivorship".

Property held in a revocable or irrevocable trust created during the grantor's lifetime also avoids probate. In these cases in the U.S. no court action is involved and the property is distributed privately, subject to estate taxes.

The best way to determine which assets are probate assets (requiring administration) is to determine whether each asset passes outside of probate.

In jurisdictions in the U.S. that recognize a married couple's property as tenancy by the entireties, if a spouse (or partner in Hawaii) dies intestate (owning property without a will), the portion of his/her estate so titled passes to a surviving spouse without a probate.

=== Steps of probate ===
If the decedent dies without a will, known as intestacy, with the exception of real property located in another jurisdiction, the estate is distributed according to the laws of the jurisdiction where the decedent resided.

If the decedent died with a will, the will usually names an executor (personal representative), who carries out the instructions laid out in the will. The executor marshals the decedent's assets. If there is no will, or if the will does not name an executor, the probate court can appoint one. Traditionally, the representative of an intestate estate is called an administrator. If the decedent died with a will, but only a copy of the will can be located, many states allow the copy to be probated, subject to the rebuttable presumption that the testator destroyed the will before death.

In some cases, where the person named as executor cannot administer the probate, or wishes to have someone else do so, another person is named administrator. An executor or an administrator may receive compensation for his service. Additionally, beneficiaries of an estate may be able to remove the appointed executor if they are not capable of properly fulfilling their duties.

The representative of a testate estate who is someone other than the executor named in the will is an administrator with the will annexed, or administrator c.t.a. (from the Latin cum testamento annexo). The generic term for executors or administrators is personal representative.

The probate court may require that the executor provide a fidelity bond, an insurance policy in favor of the estate to protect against possible abuse by the executor.

After opening the probate case with the court, the personal representative inventories and collects the decedent's property. Next, he pays any debts and taxes, including estate tax, if the estate is taxable at the federal or state level. Finally, he distributes the remaining property to the beneficiaries, either as instructed in the will, or under the intestacy laws of the state.

A party may challenge any aspect of the probate administration, such as a direct challenge to the validity of the will, known as a will contest, a challenge to the status of the person serving as personal representative, a challenge as to the identity of the heirs, and a challenge to whether the personal representative is properly administering the estate. Issues of paternity can be disputed among the potential heirs in intestate estates, especially with the advent of inexpensive DNA profiling techniques. In some situations, however, even biological heirs can be denied their inheritance rights, while non-biological heirs can be granted inheritance rights.

The personal representative must understand and abide by the fiduciary duties, such as a duty to keep money in interest-bearing accounts and to treat all beneficiaries equally. Not complying with the fiduciary duties may allow interested persons to petition for the removal of the personal representative and hold the personal representative liable for any harm to the estate.

== See also ==
- Administration (probate law)
- Inheritance
- National Probate Calendar
