= Personal representative =

Person appointed by a court to administer the estate of another

In common law jurisdictions, a personal representative or legal personal representative is a person appointed by a court to administer the estate of another person. If the estate being administered is that of a deceased person, the personal representative is either an executor if the deceased person left a will or an administrator of an intestate estate. In other situations, the personal representative may be a guardian or trustee, or other position. As a fiduciary, a personal representative has the duties of loyalty, candor or honesty, and good faith. In the United States, punctilio of honor, or the highest standard of honor, is the level of scrupulousness that a fiduciary must abide by.

In either case of a deceased estate, a probate court of competent jurisdiction issues a finding of fact, including that a will has or has not been filed, and that an executor or administrator has been appointed. The documents issued by the probate court are often referred to as "letters testamentary", "letters of administration" or "letters of representation". These documents, along with the appropriate death certificate, are often the only license a person needs to do the banking, stock trading, real estate transactions, and other actions necessary to marshal and dispose of the deceased's estate in the name of the estate itself.

== Types ==
There are a number of types of personal representatives, including:

- Administrator
- Administrator de bonis non - one acting without complete authority
- Alternate executor
- Ancillary administrator
- Conservator
- Executor or executrix (term for females)
- Legal guardian
- Overseer - an assistant to an executor, now mostly obsolete
- Public administrator

== U.S. Department of Defense ==
In the U.S., the Office for the Administrative Review of the Detention of Enemy Combatants appointed a Personal Representative (CSRT) to meet with each captive who was still being held in extrajudicial detention in the United States Guantanamo Bay detention camps, in Cuba, in August 2004, when the Supreme Court forced the Department of Defense to start convening Combatant Status Review Tribunals. Such a personal representative is more like a guardian ad litem.

== Bibliography ==
- Hayton, D. & Marshall, C. (2005). Commentary and Cases on the Law of Trusts and Equitable Remedies. London: Sweet & Maxwell. ISBN 0-421-90190-X.
