= Trevor Stamp =

Trevor Stamp may refer to:

- Trevor Stamp, 3rd Baron Stamp, British medical doctor and bacteriologist
- Trevor Stamp, 4th Baron Stamp, British medical doctor and hereditary peer
