= Scarle v Scarle =

Scarle v Scarle, Re Scarle
- Court: England and Wales High Court
- Decided: 14 August 2019
- Citations: [2019] EWHC 2224 (Ch), [2019] 4 WLR 119, 22 ITELR 506, [2019] WTLR 1369, [2019] WLR(D) 483

Court membership
- Judge sitting: Philip Kramer QC

Scarle v Scarle [2019] EWHC 2224 (Ch), also known as In re Scarle and Winter v Cutler, is an English case on the rules of intestacy and simultaneous death. Decided by the High Court, the case built on previously unclear areas surrounding Section 184 of the Law of Property Act 1925.

== Facts ==
John and Ann Scarle were a married couple with children from previous relationships. The claimant was the daughter of John Scarle, Ms Winter. The defendant was the daughter of Ann Scarle, Ms Cutler. Both John and Ann had died with no clear indication of who had died first. The question for the court to decide was which step-sibling, in the absence of a clear will, would inherit the property the Scarle's had lived in and a sum of money in their bank account. The defendant, Cutler, had originally attempted to use mediation in order to offer a 50/50 split of the estate, which was rejected by Winter who began litigation.

== Judgment ==
The defendant relied on Section 184 of the Law of Property Act 1925, also known as the Commorientes Rule. This states that the oldest person in the pair is assumed to have died first when the circumstances are unclear. The judge accepted this view, assuming that the older John Scarle had passed first. Therefore, under the Right of Survivorship in joint tenancies, the whole estate had been absorbed by Ann Scarle before passing to the defendant upon Ann Scarle's own death. Therefore, Cutler inherited the entire estate and the sum of money in the bank account. Winter was awarded nothing and ordered to pay £179,000 worth of legal fees.
