= William Valentine Wood =

British businessman (1883–1959)

Sir William Valentine Wood KBE
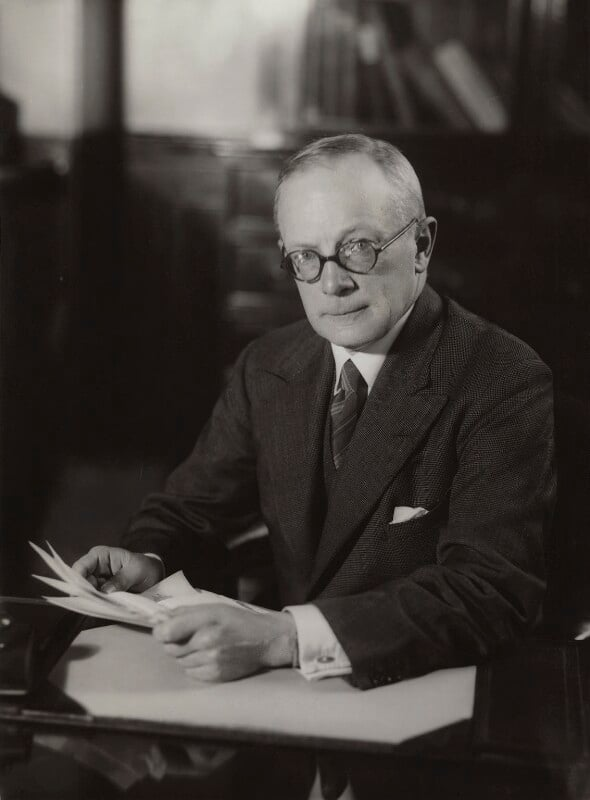
- Wood in 1941
- Born: 14 February 1883; Ireland
- Died: 26 August 1959 (aged 76)
- Education: Methodist College Belfast
- Known for: President of the LMS 1941–1948

Sir William Valentine Wood KBE (14 February 1883 – 26 August 1959) was a British businessman. He worked for much of his life on the London, Midland and Scottish Railway (LMS), rising to become its President.

== Biography ==
William Wood; Willie Wood to his railway colleagues and Val to his family, attended Methodist College, Belfast before joining the Northern Counties Committee (NCC) as an accountant. Here he expanded his interest to all matters relating to the railway. During World War I he worked for the government, and when the Ministry of Transport was created in 1919 he became its first director of finance. He later returned to railway work on the LMS, successor to the Midland Railway which had owned the NCC, where he became vice president (finance and services). When Josiah Stamp was killed in 1941, Wood was asked to take over as President, a post which he held until the nationalisation of the Railways in 1948. He then worked for five years with the British Transport Commission (BTC) whose Chairman, Sir Cyril Hurcombe, he had come to know during his time in the Ministry of Transport.

Business positions
Preceded by Sir Josiah Stamp	President of the London, Midland and Scottish Railway; 1941–1948	Company nationalised and merged into British Railways
