= Trevor Stamp, 3rd Baron Stamp =

Trevor Charles Stamp, 3rd Baron Stamp (13 February 1907 – 16 November 1987) was a British medical doctor and bacteriologist.

He was the son of Josiah Stamp, 1st Baron Stamp, and was educated at The Leys School, Gonville and Caius College, Cambridge, and St Bartholomew's Hospital.

He succeeded his brother Wilfred Stamp and father as Baron Stamp when they were killed during the war by German bombing. As they were killed together, English law has a legal fiction that in the event of the order of deaths being indeterminable, the elder is deemed to have died first. Legally therefore, Josiah is presumed to have died first and Wilfred momentarily inherited the peerage: and as a consequence the family had to pay death duty twice.

He was a member of the Liberal Party in the House of Lords but later became a cross-bencher.

He was Professor of Bacteriology, at the Royal Postgraduate Medical School, University of London from 1948 to 1970.*

He was succeeded by his son, Trevor Stamp, 4th Baron Stamp.

== Arms ==
Coat of arms of Baron Stamp
Crest Issuant from a mount vert bezantée a demi-horse argent. Escutcheon Gules between two garbs or three bezants in bend each charged with a horse passant sable. Supporters On either side a horse argent resting the interior hind leg on a bezant. Motto Fidei Commissa Teneo (I hold in trust that which is trusted to me).

Peerage of the United Kingdom
Preceded by Wilfred Stamp	Baron Stamp; 1941–1987	Succeeded by Trevor Stamp
