= Wilfred Stamp, 2nd Baron Stamp =

British peer (1904–1941)

Wilfred Carlyle Stamp, 2nd Baron Stamp, ACA (28 October 1904 – 16 April 1941) was a son of the British banker Josiah Stamp, 1st Baron Stamp. He holds the record for holding a peerage for the shortest length of time.

Stamp was born in Hereford, while his father was working there as a civil servant for the Inland Revenue.

He was educated at The Leys School, Cambridge, then went up to King's College, Cambridge, where he graduated as Master of Arts.

He became by profession a chartered accountant.

Stamp married on 10 December 1929, a fellow Cambridge graduate (BA), Katharine Mary, daughter of Tom Wickett of Redruth, Cornwall. They had three daughters:

- The Hon. Nancy Elizabeth Stamp, born 21 June 1931.
- The Hon. Veronica Stamp, born 25 May 1934.
- The Hon. Jessica Catherine Stamp, born 21 September 1936.

At time of his death he lived near his father at 'Farringleys', Park Hill Road, Shortlands, Beckenham, Kent.

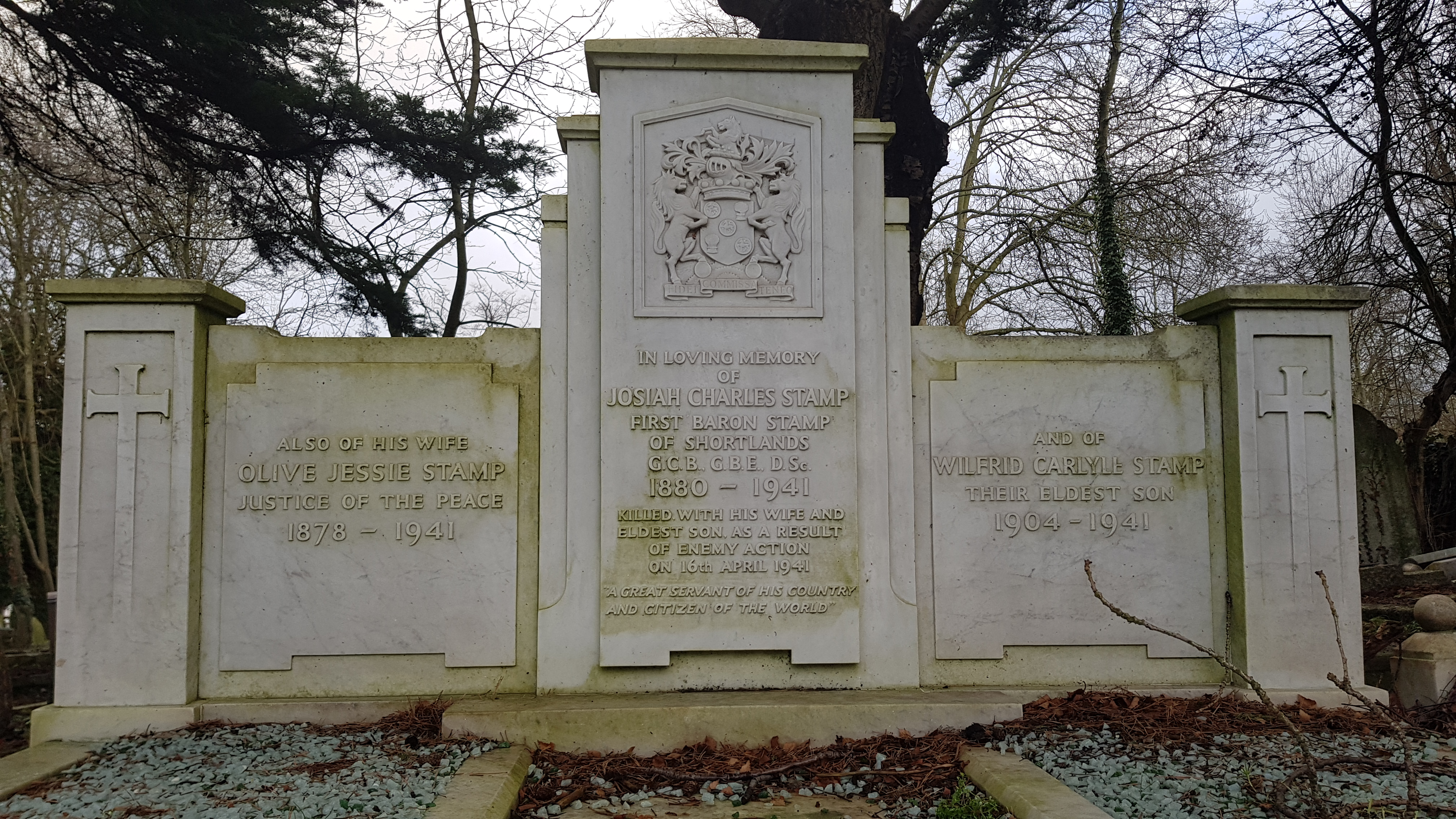
Grave of Wilfred Stamp and his parents Josiah and Olive

Stamp was killed, aged thirty-six, along with his father Josiah Stamp, the second-richest man in Britain at the time, when the latter's house, 'Tantallon' in Park Hill Road, Shortlands, Beckenham, was bombed in 1941 during The Blitz. Stamp's mother, Olive Jessie Stamp, Lady Stamp, was killed by the same bomb. They were buried at Beckenham Cemetery.

English law has a legal fiction that, when the order of death is indeterminable, the eldest is deemed to have died first. Legally therefore Wilfred momentarily inherited the peerage of Baron Stamp and the family had to pay death duty twice. Because Wilfred left no sons, the peerage was passed to his father's second son Trevor.

The shortest peerage without legal fiction was Charles Brandon, 3rd Duke of Suffolk, who outlived his brother Henry Brandon, 2nd Duke of Suffolk, by an hour.

Peerage of the United Kingdom
Preceded by Josiah Stamp	Baron Stamp; 1941	Succeeded by Trevor Stamp
