= Pearson & Cox =

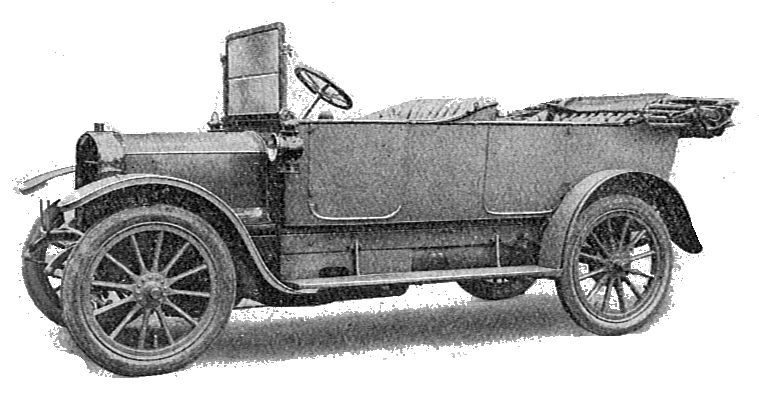
Pearson & Cox Torpedo 15 H.P. steam car, circa. 1913

Pearson & Cox was a British automobile manufacturer from Shortlands, then in Kent (now part of Greater London). They traded from 1908 to 1916, and in 1913.), they were producing both steam-powered vehicles and petrol-powered cyclecars.

Henry Pearson and Percy Cox were apprenticed to the General Engine and Boiler Company. From 1908 to 1916, the company's main interest was the design and production of steam cars. The Pearson-Cox Cyclecar was powered by an 8 hp V-2 JAP engine.

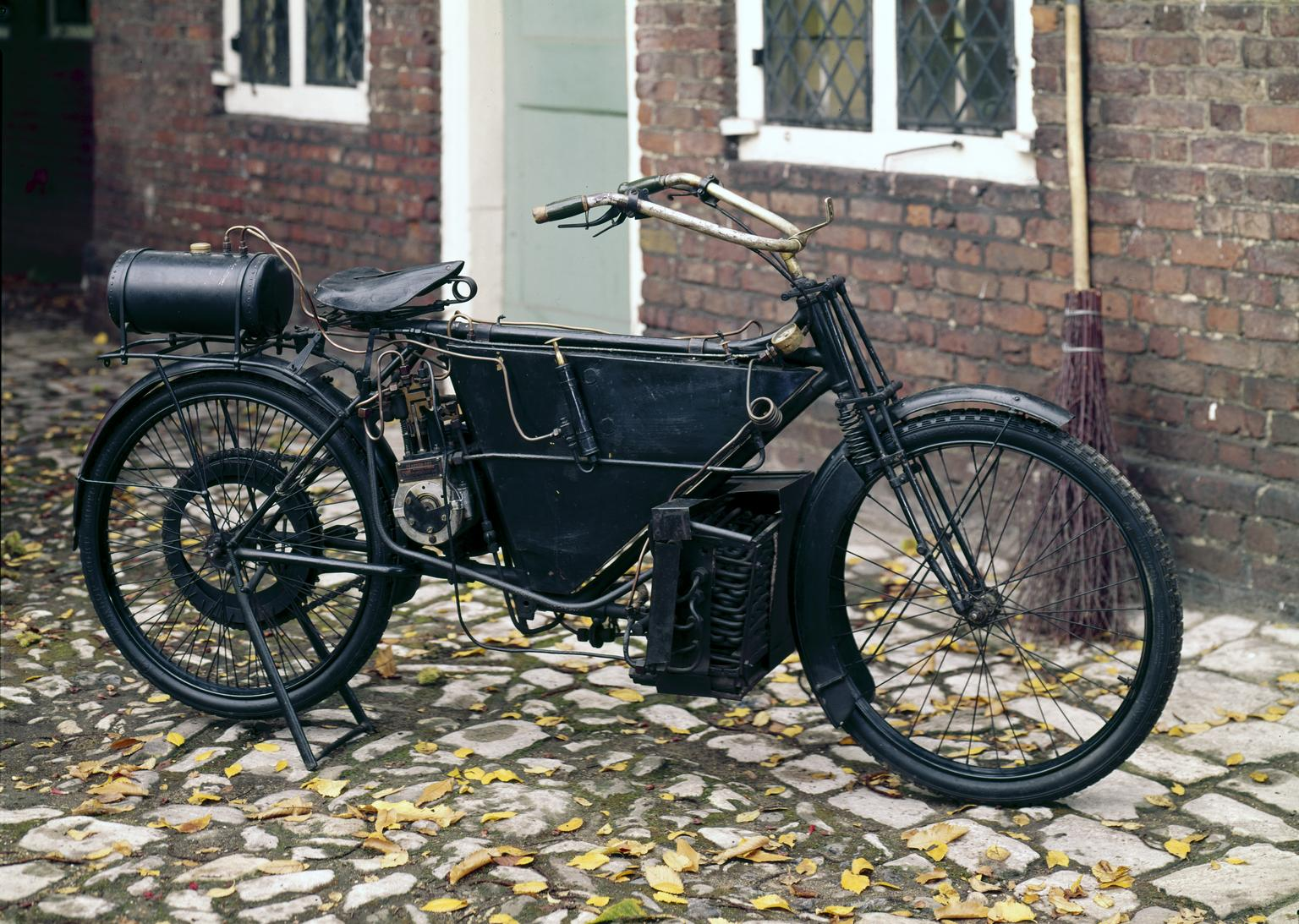
Pearson & Cox 3 H.P. steam bicycle, of 1912

They also as a sideline developed a steam motorcycle, and in 1912, they offered a steam bicycle for sale to the public, the production run of which lasted for about two years when, in 1914, Cox disposed of his manufacturing rights to the 'Steam Cycle and Motor Company' of St Michael's Road, Croydon.

== See also ==
- List of car manufacturers of the United Kingdom

== Sources ==
- Harald Linz und Halwart Schrader: Die Internationale Automobil-Enzyklopädie. United Soft Media Verlag GmbH, München 2008, ISBN 978-3-8032-9876-8
- Nick Georgano: The Beaulieu Encyclopedia of the Automobile, Volume 3 P–Z. Fitzroy Dearborn Publishers, Chicago 2001, ISBN 1-57958-293-1 (englisch)
- David Culshaw & Peter Horrobin: The Complete Catalogue of British Cars 1895-1975. Veloce Publishing plc. Dorchester (1997). ISBN 1-874105-93-6
