= Joseph Thomas Last =

English missionary, explorer and naturalist

Joseph Thomas Last (1849, Tuddenham- 1933, Shortlands) was an English missionary, explorer and naturalist.

In 1872 Last was ordained at the Church Missionary College. From 1874 to 1876 he was in East Africa at the mission at Kisulutini. He briefly returned to Britain and then in 1877 he was appointed to the Usagara Mission at Mpwapwa. In 1880 he founded a new station at Mamboya in the Nguru mountains. After seven years in East Africa he returned to Britain in December 1884. Later he was associated with Royal Geographical Society and the Imperial British East Africa Company. He visited Portuguese East Africa in 1885, explored the Namuli Mountains and discovered the caves at Mangapwani in Zanzibar.

Last made important collections of African Lepidoptera and Mollusca.

== Works ==
partial list

- Notes on Western Madagascar and the Antinosi Country.
- A Visit to the Masai People Living beyond the Borders of Nguru Country. Proceedings of the Royal Geographical Society 5 (9): 517-543, 568 (map), 1883.
- Grammar of the Kamba Language, Eastern Equatorial Africa. London: Society for Promoting Christian Knowledge (Northumberland Avenue, Charing Cross, W.C.) / Printed by William Clowes and Sons, Limited, 1885, 40 pp.
- On the Society's Expedition to the Namuli Hills, East Africa. Proceedings of the Royal Geographical Society, 1887.
