= London, Midland and Scottish Railway =

British railway company (1923–1947)

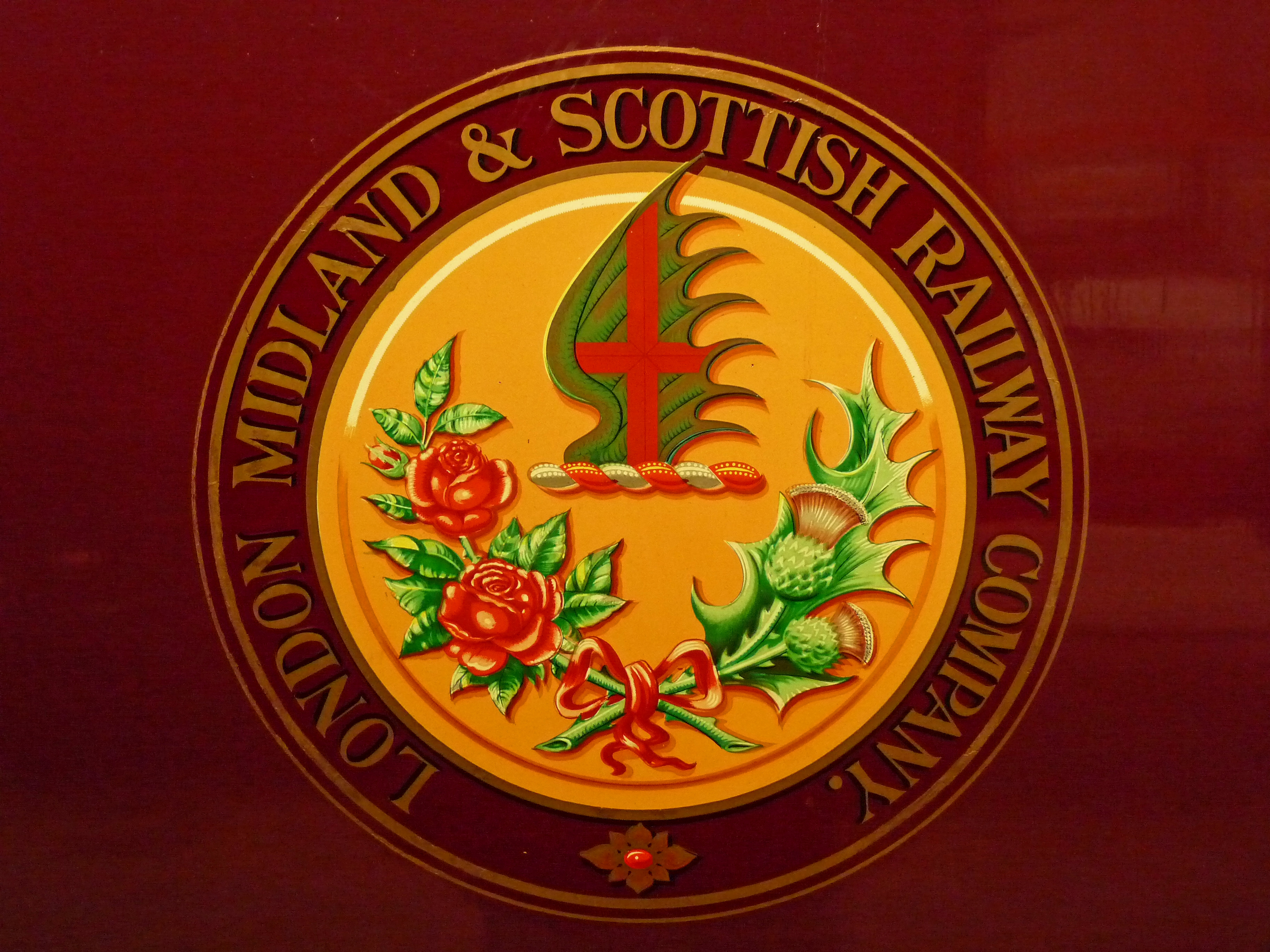
- Crest of the LMS on a railway carriage

Overview
- Headquarters: Euston House, London
- Reporting mark: LMS
- Locale: England; Northern Ireland; Scotland; Wales
- Dates of operation: 1 January 1923–1 January 1948
- Predecessor: London and North Western Railway; Midland Railway; Lancashire and Yorkshire Railway; North Staffordshire Railway; Furness Railway; Caledonian Railway; Glasgow and South Western Railway; Highland Railway
- Successor: British Railways: London Midland Region; Scottish Region; Ulster Transport Authority: Northern Counties Committee (1949)

Technical
- Track gauge: 4 ft 8 1/2 in (1,435 mm) standard gauge 5 ft 3 in (1,600 mm) in Northern Ireland
- Electrification: 600 or 650 V DC third rail 630 V DC third and fourth rail 1,200 V DC side contact third rail 6.6 kV 25 Hz AC overhead
- Length: 7,790 miles (12,537 km)

The London, Midland and Scottish Railway (LMS (Note: It has been argued that the initials LMSR should be used to be consistent with LNER, GWR and SR. The London, Midland and Scottish Railway's corporate image used LMS, and this is what is generally used in historical circles. The LMS occasionally also used the initials LM&SR. For consistency, this article uses the initials LMS.)) was a British railway company. It was formed on 1 January 1923 under the Railways Act 1921, which required the grouping of over 120 separate railways into four. The companies merged into the LMS included the London and North Western Railway, the Midland Railway, the Lancashire and Yorkshire Railway (which had previously merged with the London and North Western Railway on 1 January 1922), several Scottish railway companies (including the Caledonian Railway), and numerous other, smaller ventures.

Besides being the world's largest transport organisation, the company was also the largest commercial enterprise in the British Empire and the United Kingdom's second largest employer, after the Post Office.

In 1938, the LMS operated 6,870 miles (11,056 km) of railway (excluding its lines in Northern Ireland), but its profitability was generally disappointing, with a rate of return of only 2.7%. Under the Transport Act 1947, along with the other members of the "Big Four" British railway companies (Great Western Railway, London and North Eastern Railway and Southern Railway), the LMS was nationalised on 1 January 1948, becoming part of the state-owned British Railways.

The LMS was the largest of the Big Four railway companies serving routes in England, Northern Ireland, Scotland and Wales.

== Geography ==
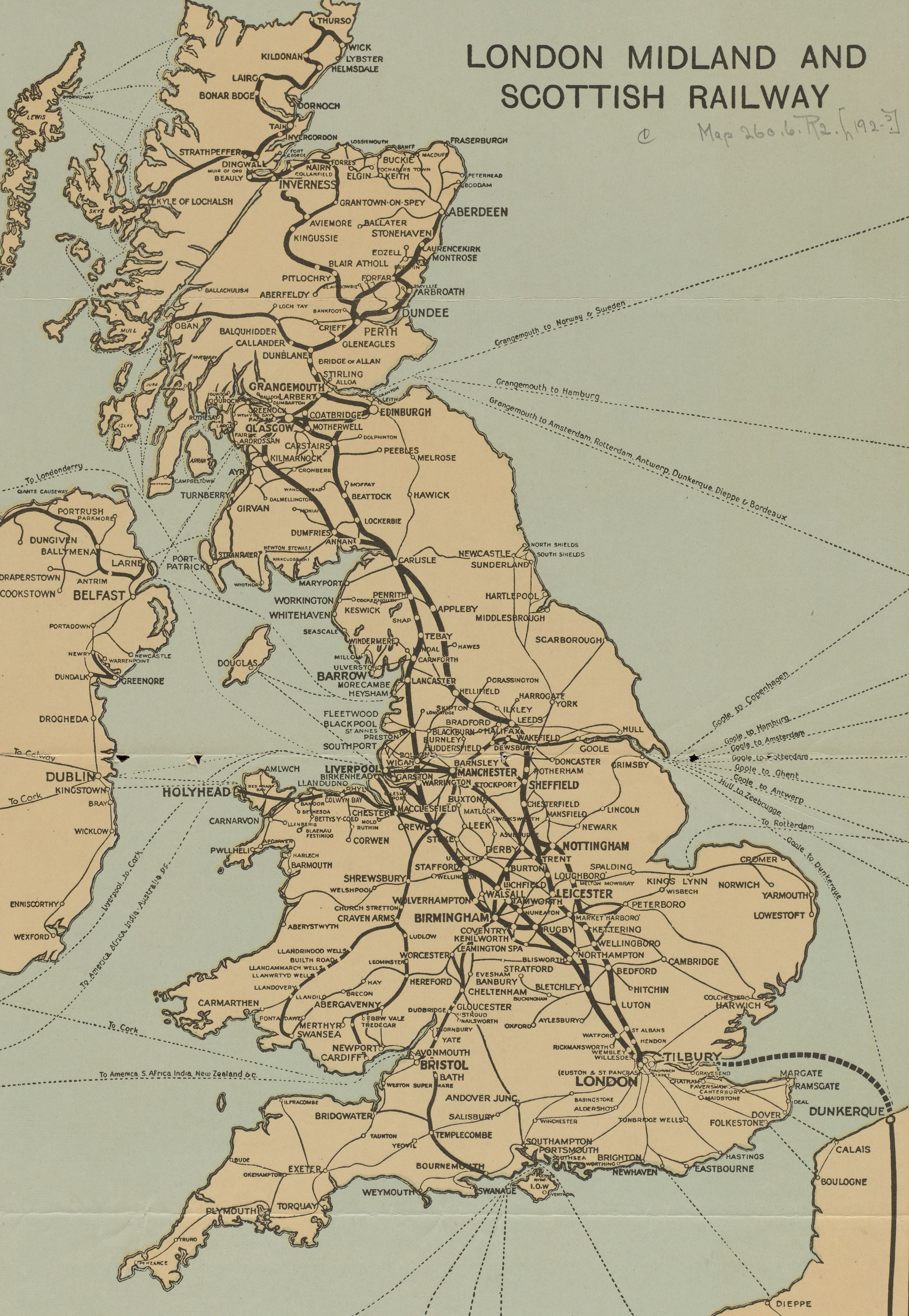
1920s map of LMS network

=== Overview ===
The Railways Act 1921 created four large railway companies which were in effect geographical monopolies, albeit with competition at their boundaries, and with some lines either reaching into competitor territory, or being jointly operated.

The LMS operated services in and around London, the Midlands, the North West of England, Mid/North Wales and Scotland. The company also operated a separate network of lines in Northern Ireland.

The principal routes were the West Coast Main Line and the Midland Main Line, which had been the main routes of the two largest constituent companies, the London and North Western Railway and the Midland Railway respectively.

At the time of its creation, the LMS had inherited from the 35 merged companies, a system of 7,000 route miles and 19,000 track miles; accounting for 38.4% of the total mileage of the 'big four' grouped railways. It was the owner of 9,319 locomotives, 19,000 passenger-carrying vehicles, and 286,000 wagons. It operated more than 10,600 passenger trains and 15,000 goods trains a day, with a total staff of 231,000. In addition to this, the LMS owned 543 miles of canal, 8,950 horses, 17,000 carts, 2,000 motor vehicles, 64 steamboats and 27 docks, and was the owner of 28 hotels.

=== Joint lines ===
The LMS operated a number of lines jointly with the other main railway companies, a situation which arose when the former joint owners of a route were placed into different post-grouping companies. Most of these were situated at or near the boundaries between two or more of the companies, but there were some notable examples which extended beyond this borderland zone.

Together with the London and North Eastern Railway, the LMS ran the former Midland and Great Northern Joint Railway network. Exceeding 183 miles (295 km), this was the largest jointly operated network in Great Britain in terms of route mileage, and extended from Peterborough to the East Anglian coast. The M&GN was wholly incorporated into the LNER in 1936.

The LMS also operated a significant joint network with the Southern Railway, in the shape of the former Somerset and Dorset Joint Railway. This network connected Bath and Bournemouth, and wound its way through territory nominally allocated to a third railway company, the Great Western.

Through the former Midland Railway holdings, the LMS, together with the Great Northern Railway (Ireland), jointly owned the County Donegal Railways Joint Committee lines.

=== Areas of competition ===
Being geographically the largest, and the most central of the four main post-grouping railway companies, the LMS shared numerous boundaries with both the LNER and GWR, although its overlap with the Southern Railway was limited due to the general lack of direct routes through London. The SR and the LMS were mainly overlapping on the West London Line.

Competition with the LNER was mainly in terms of the premium London to Scotland traffic, with the rival LMS (West Coast) and LNER (East Coast) routes competing to provide ever better standards of passenger comfort and faster journey times. The LNER also competed with the LMS for traffic between London, the East Midlands, South Yorkshire and Manchester, with the former Midland main line from St Pancras (LMS) and Great Central Main Line from Marylebone (LNER) both providing express, stopping and local services between these destinations.

The London to Birmingham corridor was fiercely contested with the LMS running expresses over its West Coast Main Line via Rugby, and the Great Western running services via Banbury.

=== Northern Ireland ===
The LMS was also the only one of the Big Four companies to operate rail services in Northern Ireland, serving most major settlements in the region.

On 1 July 1903, the Midland Railway took over the Belfast and Northern Counties Railway and operated it under the name of Midland Railway (Northern Counties Committee). On grouping, the network became part of the LMS, again operating under the name of the Northern Counties Committee, and consisted of 201 miles (323 km) of 5 ft 3 in (1,600 mm) gauge track with a further 63 miles (101 km) of 3 ft (914 mm) gauge line.

=== Apparent geographical anomalies ===
The expansionist policies of many of the constituent companies which formed the LMS, particularly the Midland Railway and the London and North Western Railway, resulted in the LMS owning or operating a number of lines outside its core geographical area. For instance, in 1912, the Midland Railway had purchased the London, Tilbury and Southend Railway which operated between London Fenchurch Street and Shoeburyness, with a loop serving Tilbury. These lines were automatically included in the LMS Group, along with the rest of the Midland Railway system, which meant that the LMS had a considerable presence in a part of the country (south Essex) which could be said to form part of the natural territory of the LNER. The process of Grouping under the Railways Act did not address geographical anomalies of this kind, although this particular arrangement did provide a competitive choice for residents of Southend, who could take LNER services from Southend Victoria to London Liverpool Street or LMS services from Southend Central to Fenchurch Street.

== History ==
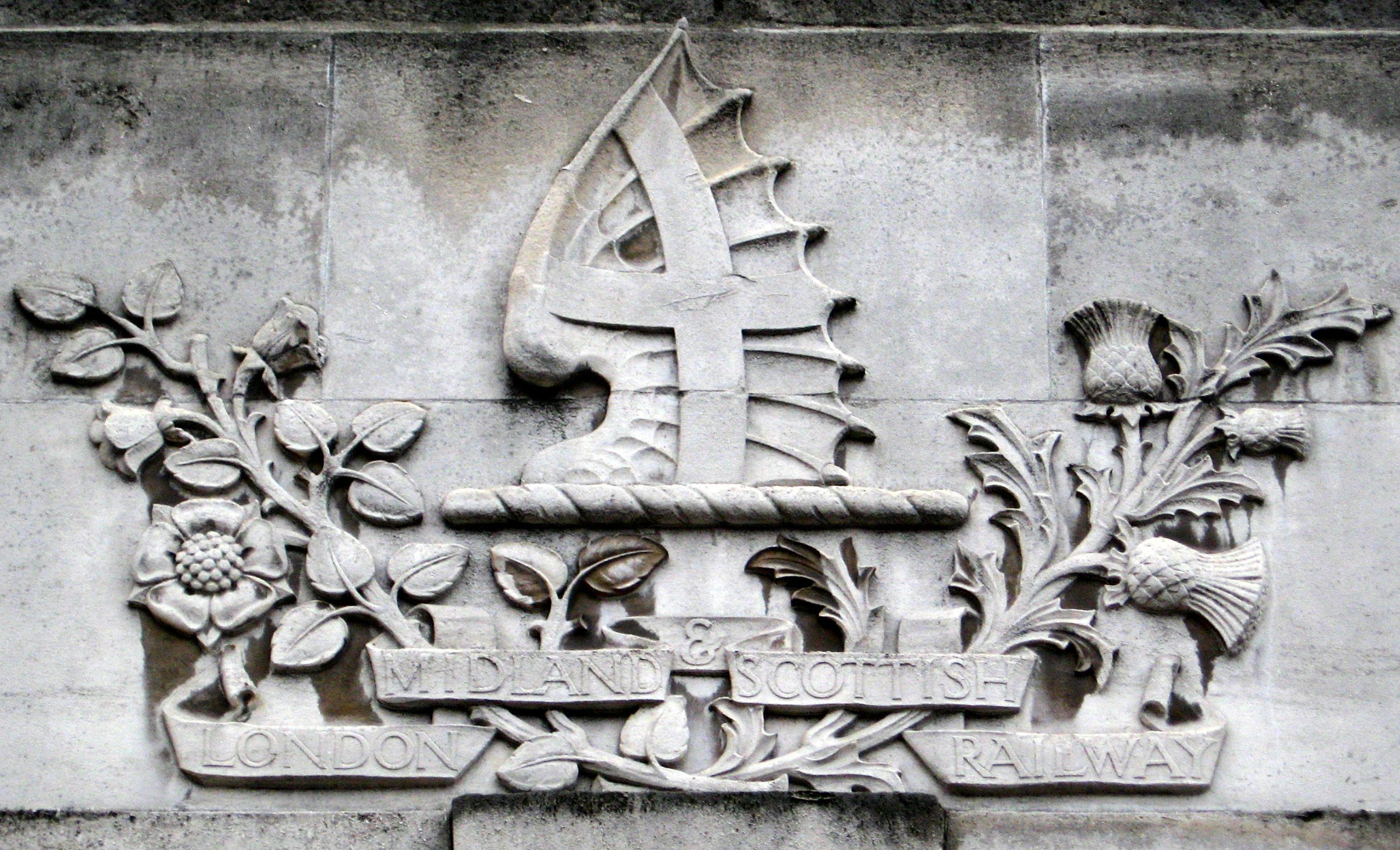
LMS crest, carved into the stonework at Leeds station

=== Formation ===
The LMS was formed from the following major companies:

- Caledonian Railway 1,114.4 miles (1,793 km) route length
- Furness Railway 158 miles (254 km)
- Glasgow and South Western Railway 498.5 miles (802 km)
- Highland Railway 506 miles (814 km)
- London and North Western Railway (including Lancashire and Yorkshire Railway, amalgamated 1 January 1922) 2,667.5 miles (4,292.9 km)
- Midland Railway 2,170.75 miles (3,493 km)
- North Staffordshire Railway 220.75 miles (355 km)

There were also some 24 subsidiary railways, leased or worked by the above companies, and a large number of joint railways, including the UK's largest Joint Railway, the Midland & Great Northern, and one of the most famous, the Somerset & Dorset. The LMS was the minority partner (with the LNER) in the Cheshire Lines Committee.

In Ireland there were three railways:

- Dundalk, Newry and Greenore Railway 26.5 miles (42 km)
- Northern Counties Committee 265.25 miles (426 km)
- Joint Midland and Great Northern of Ireland Railway 91 miles (146 km), with interests in Ireland

All of the above operated, at least partially, in Northern Ireland

The total route mileage of the LMS in 1923 was 7,790 miles (12,537 km).

=== Early history ===
The early history of the LMS was dominated by infighting between parties representing its constituent parts, many of whom had previously been commercial and territorial rivals. This was particularly marked in the case of the Midland and the North Western, each of which believed its way was the right – and only – way of doing business. This rivalry was so severe, that stories of connecting trains at Birmingham New Street from the previous LNWR and MR parts of the system, being deliberately made to miss each other persisted even as late as the early 1950s, long after their demise. Many of the senior appointments on the operating side were of former Midland men, such as James Anderson, so that Midland ideas and practices tended to prevail over those of other constituents. For example, the Midland's system of traffic control was imposed on a system-wide basis, along with the Midland livery of Crimson Lake for passenger locomotives and rolling stock. Particularly notable, especially after the appointment of Sir Henry Fowler as Chief Mechanical Engineer, was the continuation of the Midland Railway's small-engine policy (see Locomotives of the Midland Railway).

The LMS also implemented a novel management structure, breaking with British railway tradition, and mirroring a contemporary management practice more common in the United States, appointing a president and vice-presidents. On 4 January 1926, Josiah Stamp was appointed first president of the executive, the equivalent of a chief executive in modern organisational structures. He added the role of chairman of the board of directors to his portfolio in January 1927, succeeding Sir Guy Granet.

=== The Stanier revolution ===
The arrival of the new chief mechanical engineer, William Stanier, who was brought in from the Great Western Railway by Josiah Stamp in 1932, heralded a change. Stanier introduced practices used at the Swindon Works that had been introduced by George Jackson Churchward, such as tapered boilers, long travel valves, and large bearings. His locomotives were not only more powerful, and economical, but they also ended the company's internal conflict.

=== Nationalisation ===
The war-damaged LMS was nationalised in 1948 by the Transport Act 1947, becoming part of British Railways. It formed the London Midland Region and part of the Scottish Region. British Railways transferred the lines in Northern Ireland to the Ulster Transport Authority in 1949. The London Midland & Scottish Railway Company continued to exist as a legal entity for nearly two years after Nationalisation, being formally wound up on 23 December 1949. The lines in Great Britain were rationalised through closure in the 1950s to 70s but the main routes survive and some have been developed for 125 mph inter-city services.

== Railway operations ==
Despite having widespread interests in a number of commercial areas, the LMS was first and foremost a railway organisation. It operated in all four constituent countries of the United Kingdom, and in England its operations penetrated 32 of the 40 counties. The company operated around 7,000 route miles of railway line, servicing 2,944 goods depots and 2,588 passenger stations, using 291,490 freight vehicles, 20,276 passenger vehicles and 9,914 locomotives. The company directly employed 263,000 staff, and through its annual coal consumption of over six and a half million tons, could claim to indirectly employ a further 26,500 coal miners.

=== Commercial organisation ===
For nearly ten years after its formation, the LMS had been run using a similar organisational structure to one of its constituents, the Midland Railway. In practice this meant that the commercial managers found themselves subservient to the needs of the operating departments. This changed in 1932 when a major restructuring was completed, replacing the traditional board of directors with an executive headed by a president, supported by vice-presidents each with responsibility for a specific area. Ernest Lemon, who had briefly held the office of Chief Mechanical Engineer pending the arrival of William Stanier became vice-president (railway traffic, operating and commercial), with separate chief operating and chief commercial managers of equal status reporting to him. Railway operations were directed by Charles Byrom, a veteran officer of the LNWR, while commercial activities were headed by Ashton Davies, formerly of the Lancashire and Yorkshire Railway.

Davies created a commercial research section, increased the sales force and provided them with specialist training. The emphasis of the organisation switched from operators dictating what was reasonable to the commercial managers asking what was possible to maximise sales opportunities. Thirty five district managers were appointed to oversee sales through the company's goods depots, passenger stations and key dock facilities. There was even sales representation in the Irish Free State, certain European countries and North America. A monthly newsletter was produced entitled Quota News, and trophies were awarded to the best performing districts and salesmen. To provide maximum capacity during times of peak demand, the operating department re-organised maintenance schedules to maximise the availability of locomotives and rolling stock, and trained staff to step into key roles; firemen trained as drivers and locomotive cleaners trained to replace firemen.

Numerous special fares were introduced to encourage travel, develop niche markets and overcome competitors. The cheap day return ticket offered return travel at a price usually equivalent to the single fare, although in areas with rival bus services they were sometimes offered at less than the single fare. Companies holding large freight accounts with the LMS received reduced price season tickets for nominated employees, while commercial travellers, anglers and conveyors of racing pigeons were all tempted with special offers.

Passenger miles rose quite dramatically, from a low point of 6,500 million in 1932 to 8,500 million by 1937, while at the same time the number of coaches required was reduced through improved maintenance and more efficient utilisation. In 1938 it opened a School of Transport in Derby to train its staff in best railway practice.

=== Railway posters ===
The LMS's commercial success in the 1920s resulted in part from the contributions of English painter, Norman Wilkinson. In 1923, Wilkinson advised Superintendent of Advertising and Publicity of the LMS, T.C Jeffrey, to improve rail sales and other LMS services by incorporating fine art into the design of their advertisement posters. In this time, fine art already had a distinguished association in Europe and North America with good taste, longevity and quality. Jeffrey wanted LMS' commercial image to align with these qualities and therefore accepted Wilkinson's advice. For the first series of posters, Wilkinson personally invited 16 of his fellow alumni from the Royal Academy of London to take part. In letter correspondence, Wilkinson outlined the details of the LMS proposal to the artists. The artist fee for each participant was £100. The railway poster would measure 50 X 40 inches. In this area, the artist's design would be reproduced as a photolithographic print on double royal satin paper, filling 45 X 35 inches. (Note: A photolithographic print is formed from the natural aversion of oil and water. The print is created by transferring a photographic image onto an aluminium plate or stone and then printing by hand.) The mass-produced posters were pasted inside railway stations in England, Northern Ireland, Scotland and Wales. LMS decided the subject advertised, but choices of style and approach were left to the artist's discretion. LMS' open design brief resulted in a collection of posters that reflected the large capacity of destinations and experiences available with the transport organisation. For the Irish Free State, Wilkinson designed a poster in 1927 encouraging the public to avail of the LMS ferry and connecting boat trains to Ireland. For this promotion, Wilkinson's design was accompanied with four posters of Ireland by Belfast modernist painter, Paul Henry. The commercial success of Wilkinson and Jeffrey's collaboration manifested between 1924 and 1928, with public sale of 12,000 railway posters. Paul Henry's 1925 poster depicting the Gaeltacht region of Connemara in County Galway proved most commercially popular, with 1,500 sales.

=== Charter and excursion traffic ===
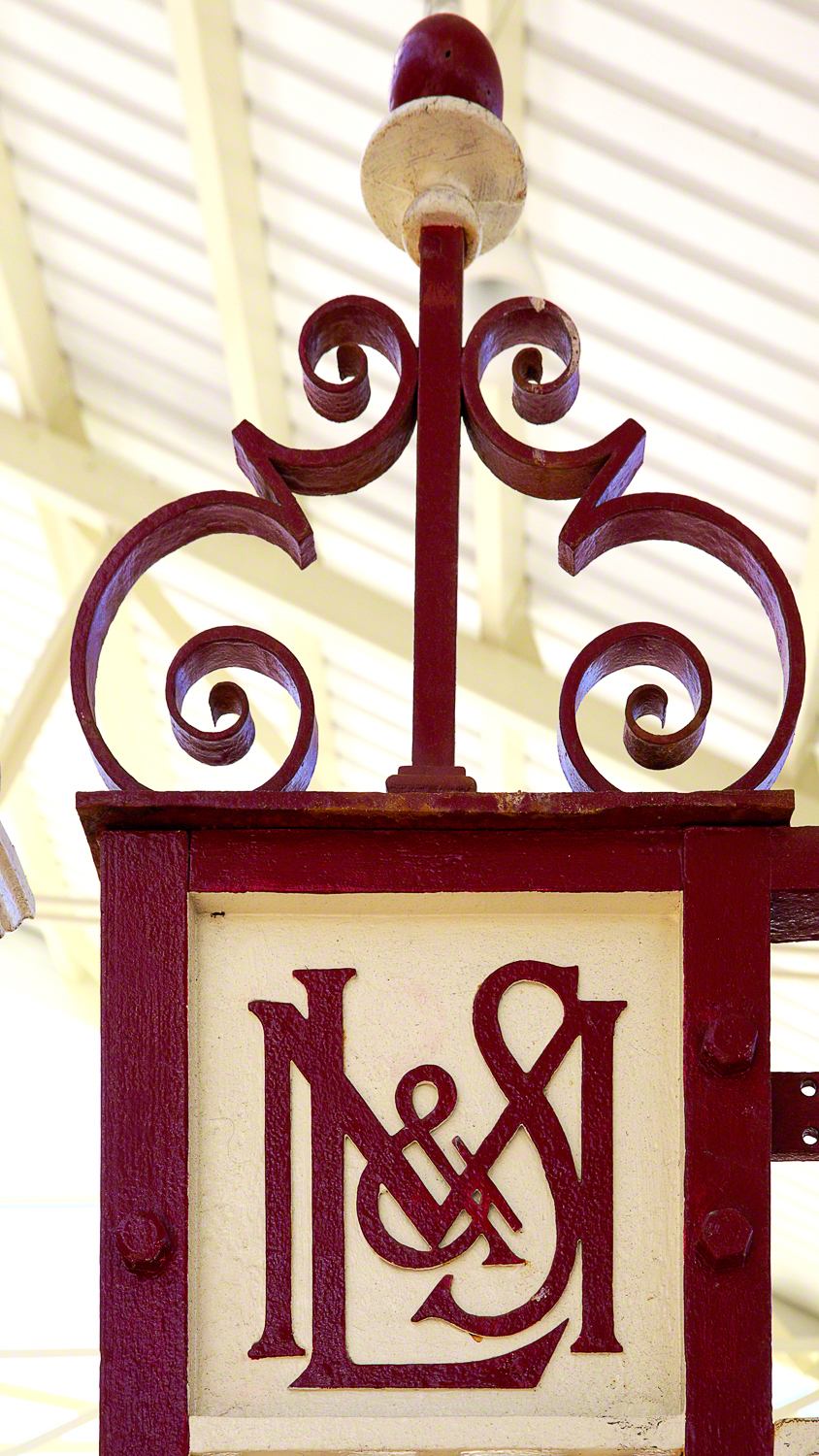
LMS monogram at Llandudno Station

Charter and excursion trains were a significant source of revenue and the LMS became a specialist in the movement of large numbers of people, with locomotives and rolling stock often kept in operation just to service such seasonal traffic. In one year, the LMS ran 43 special trains to take spectators to the Grand National at Aintree, and a further 55 for the Cup Final at Wembley. Longer running events demanded operations on a much larger scale, with the Glasgow Empire Exhibition requiring 1,800 special trains, with a further 1,456 run in connection with the Blackpool Illuminations. The number of people moved was huge, with over 2.2 million holidaymakers arriving in Blackpool between the start of July and the end of September alone. Besides these mass-market events, the company also ran regular tourist excursions to a variety of destinations, such as Oban in the Scottish highlands, Keswick in the English Lake District, and even the First World War battlefields in Belgium, by way of the Tilbury to Dunkerque ferry service and the Belgian railways.

Such was the importance of such excursion traffic that a special department was established in 1929 and oversaw the expansion from 7,500 special trains in that year to nearly 22,000 in 1938.

=== Scheduled services ===
However important the excursion traffic was, it was the ordinary scheduled services which had to be the focus of efforts to improve the fortunes of the LMS. A number of initiatives were introduced, with the aim of making train travel more attractive and encouraging business growth. Services were accelerated, and better quality rolling stock was introduced and from 24 September 1928 sleeping cars were provided for third class ticket holders for the first time. The effect of these improvements was significant, with receipts from passenger traffic increasing by £2.9 million (equivalent to £1.59285×10^{9} in 2025) between 1932 and 1938.

A number of premium services were offered, culminating in 1937 with the launch of the Coronation Scot, which featured streamlined locomotives hauling a nine coach train of specially constructed stock between London Euston and Glasgow Central in six and a half hours.

Most other major cities on the network were linked by trains with names which would become famous in railway circles including the Thames-Clyde Express between London St Pancras and Glasgow St Enoch, The Palatine between London St Pancras and Manchester Central, The Irish Mail from London Euston to Holyhead and the Pines Express conveying portions from Liverpool and Manchester to Bournemouth.

=== Goods services ===
Goods accounted for around 60% of LMS revenue, and was even more varied than passenger services, catering for a range of goods from fresh perishables such as milk, fish and meat through to bulk minerals and small consignments sent point to point between individuals and companies.

Particularly notable were the Toton–Brent coal trains, which took coal from the Nottinghamshire coalfield to London.

== Traction and rolling stock ==
=== Construction ===
The LMS owned and operated a number of railway works, all of which were inherited from constituent companies. Between them these sites constructed locomotives, coaching stock, multiple units and freight wagons, as well as a number of non-rolling stock items required for the everyday running of the railway.

Two facilities were located in Derby, one known as Derby Loco and one as Carriage and Wagon. The former was opened in the 1840s by the North Midland, Midland Counties and Birmingham & Derby railway companies to meet their joint requirements for locomotive, carriage and wagon construction and maintenance. The latter site was opened in the 1860s by the Midland Railway as part of a reorganisation of facilities in Derby and left the original site to concentrate on locomotive manufacture and repair. The Midland Railway also had works at Bromsgrove in Worcestershire, which had been inherited from the Birmingham and Gloucester Railway.

The LNWR also contributed several works sites to the LMS. Crewe Works was opened in 1840 by the Grand Junction Railway and by the time of grouping was the locomotive works for the LNWR. Wolverton works in Buckinghamshire had been established by the London and Birmingham Railway in the 1830s, and since 1862 (when all locomotive works had transferred to Crewe) had been the LNWR's carriage works. In 1922, one year prior to the formation of the LMS, the LNWR had absorbed the Lancashire and Yorkshire Railway, including their works at Horwich in Lancashire, which had opened in 1886.

St. Rollox railway works, north east of Glasgow, had been built in 1856 by the Caledonian Railway, while Stoke works in Staffordshire were established in 1864 by the North Staffordshire Railway. Both were absorbed into the LMS with their parent companies, and while the former became the main workshops for the Northern Division of the LMS, the latter works were wound down, closing in 1930, all work being transferred to nearby Crewe.

Smaller workshop facilities were also transferred to the LMS by other constituent companies, including at Barrow-in-Furness (Furness Railway), Bow (North London Railway), Kilmarnock (Glasgow and South Western Railway) and Inverness (Highland Railway). The table below shows all major works taken over by the LMS upon formation.

Works	Pre-grouping company	Type	Closed by LMS
Barassie	G&SWR	Carriage & Wagon	–
Barrow-in-Furness	FR	Locomotive	1930
Bow	NLR	Locomotive	–
Bromsgrove	MR	Wagon	–
Crewe	LNWR	Locomotive	–
Derby Carriage & Wagon	MR	Carriage & Wagon	–
Derby Loco	MR	Locomotive	–
Earlestown	LNWR	Wagon	–
Horwich	LNWR (L&Y)	Locomotive	–
Kilmarnock	G&SWR	Locomotive	–
Lochgorm (Inverness)	HR	Locomotive, Carriage & Wagon	–
Maryport	M&CR	Locomotive	c. 1925
Newton Heath	LNWR (L&Y)	Carriage & Wagon	c. 1932
Stoke-on-Trent	NSR	Locomotive	1930
St. Rollox	CR	Locomotive, Carriage & Wagon	–
Wolverton	LNWR	Carriage	–

=== Coaching stock ===
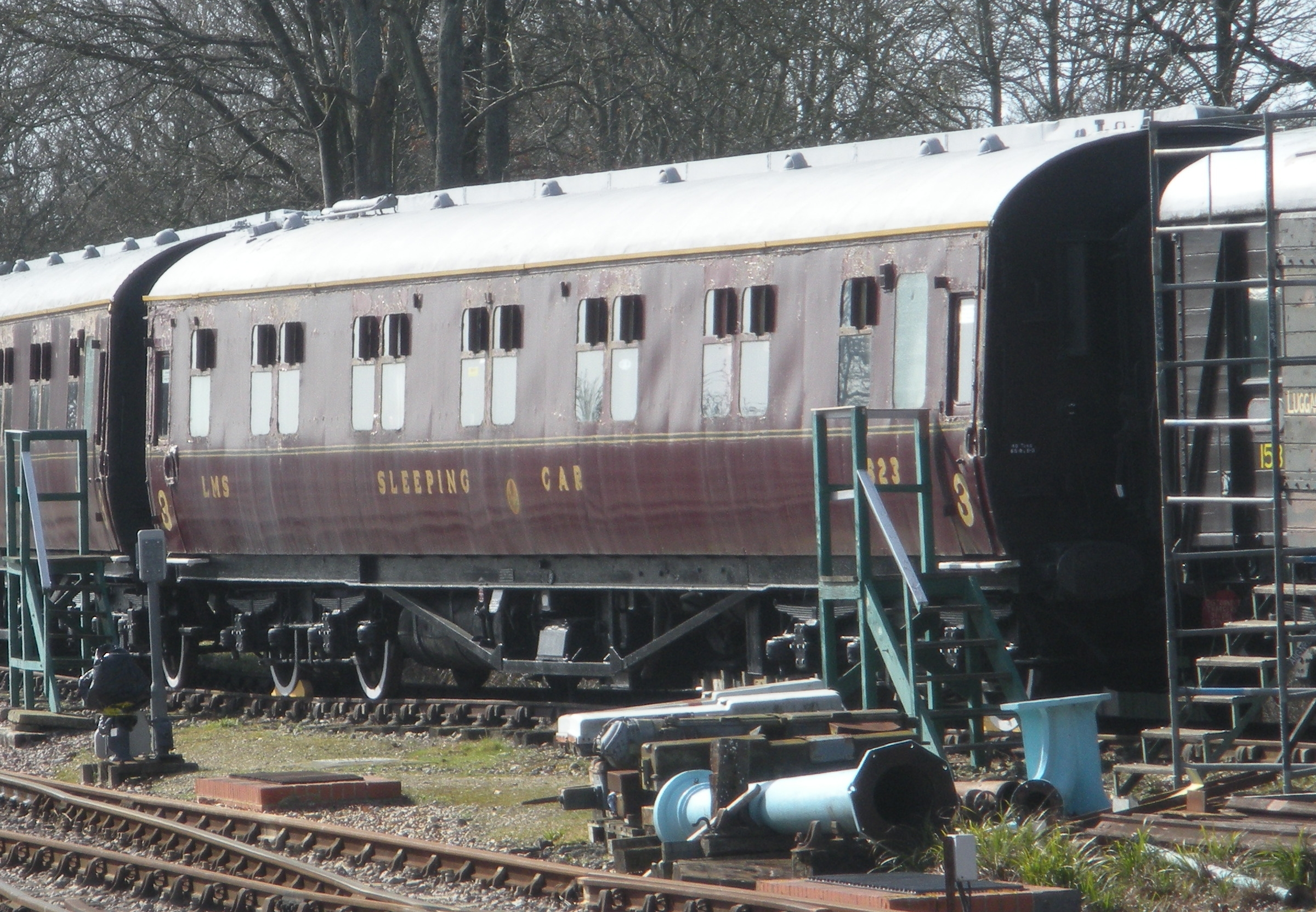
An LMS sleeping car in the standard maroon livery

The LMS inherited a wide variety of passenger rolling stock from its constituent companies, and appointed Robert Whyte Reid, an ex-Midland Railway man, as the head of its Carriage department. Reid had already started to introduce more efficient carriage building practices at the Derby Carriage and Wagon Works of the Midland Railway prior to grouping and these same practices were soon introduced to the carriage and wagon works of the former LNWR at Wolverton and the L&YR at Newton Heath.

Most railway carriages were constructed by fitting together component parts which had been roughly machined to larger dimensions than required, which were then cut to the required size and joined by skilled coachbuilders. Reid's new method involved the use of templates or "jigs" to mass-produce components to a set pattern and size. Once these had been checked any example of a specific part could be used interchangeably with any other of the same type. The technique was applied to any item which could be manufactured in large numbers (as there were significant costs in producing the initial jigs) such as doors, ventilators, windows and seats.

The natural progression was to streamline the assembly process and the company introduced a method known as Progressive Construction. In this process the mass-produced parts were combined into "unit assemblies", each of which was a major sub-component of the finished carriage such as side panels, carriage ends or the roof. The workshops were organised on the "flow-line" principle, similar to a modern assembly line, and the unit assemblies were taken to workstations, where the precision machining of the mass-produced parts ensured they all fitted accurately into position, building into a complete carriage as the unit moved along the flow line. The technique was already in use in Derby prior to grouping, and was adopted in Wolverton during 1925, with Newton Heath following two years later. By using this method, the time taken to construct a typical carriage fell from six weeks to six days and by 1931 Derby and Wolverton were able to handle the entire LMS carriage building workload, and production at Newton Heath ceased.

=== Livery ===
Each of the constituent companies of the LMS had their own liveries for locomotives and rolling stock. The board of directors of the LMS was dominated by former Midland Railway officers, and the company adopted the "crimson lake" livery for coaching stock as had been used by the Midland and Glasgow & South Western Railways prior to grouping (with the North Staffordshire Railway using a very similar shade). The livery worked well, proving to be hard wearing and practical.

== Technical innovation ==
=== Electrification ===
The LMS operated a number of suburban lines using electric traction, in and around London, Liverpool, Manchester and Lancashire.

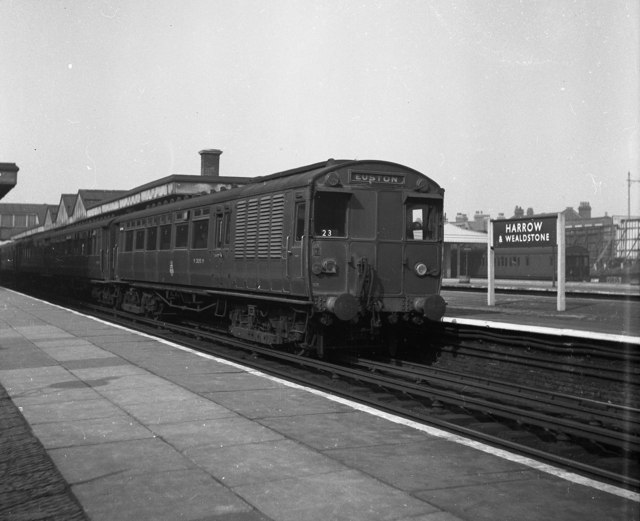
An electric multiple unit as used by the LMS in the London area, stands at Harrow and Wealdstone station after nationalisation.

Schemes in the London area generally used the four-rail system in use by tube and sub-surface railways (such as the Metropolitan Railway). Lines from Bow to Barking, Euston to Watford Junction, Broad Street to Richmond and a number of related branches and connecting lines were already electrified when the LMS came into existence, although the LMS did extend electrification from Barking to Upminster in 1932.

In the Liverpool area, lines were electrified using a third rail, energised at 630 V DC. Routes from Liverpool Exchange to Southport and Aintree and from Aintree to Ormskirk were already completed prior to the formation of the LMS. Lines from Birkenhead Park to West Kirby and New Brighton were added to this network in 1938.

In Manchester, the line from Bury to Manchester Victoria had already been electrified by the Lancashire and Yorkshire Railway using a side-contact, third rail system. In conjunction with the LNER, the lines of the former Manchester, South Junction and Altrincham Railway were electrified using the 1500 V DC overhead line system, opening on 11 May 1931.

Finally the route between Lancaster and Heysham via Morecambe had been electrified by the Midland Railway using a 6600 V AC overhead system, as early as 1908.

=== All-steel carriages ===
In 1926, the LMS introduced its "all-steel carriage", which represented a significant departure from previous carriage construction. Previously carriages had been built with wood or steel-plated wood bodies, mounted on heavy underframes. The all-steel carriages differed in that they consisted of a steel tube or box girder, which not only formed the body but also formed the load-bearing part of the carriage, meaning that a heavy underframe was not required. The new technique also meant that the carriages were stronger under collision conditions, as proved during an accident at Dinwoodie – Wamphray on 25 October 1928 when the leading "all-steel" carriage absorbed most of the impact. Construction of the carriages was carried out for the LMS by external companies, largely to provide work for them during a difficult economic period, but within a couple of years the company returned to more conventional construction methods, as it could no longer justify using external contractors due to efficiency improvements within its own workshops, which were set up to produce carriages of more traditional configuration.

== Accidents ==
- On 5 July 1923, an express passenger train was in a rear-end collision with a goods train at Diggle. Four people were killed.
- On 26 April 1924, an electric multiple unit overran signals and was in a rear-end collision with an excursion train at Euston station, London.
- On 4 November 1924, an express passenger train was derailed near Lytham St. Annes, Lancashire due to a broken tyre on the locomotive. Fourteen people were killed.
- On 8 September 1926, a passenger train was unable to stop at Leeds Wellington station due to greasy rails after a thunderstorm. It crashed through the buffers and ended up in building. There were no injuries.
- On 19 November 1926, a private owner wagon of a goods train disintegrated near Parkgate and Rawmarsh station, Yorkshire, derailing the goods train that it was part of. A signal post was partially knocked over, obstructing the adjacent line. An express passenger train had the sides of its carriages ripped open by the signal post, killing eleven people. A direct consequence of this accident was that private owner wagons had to be registered with railway companies before they were allowed to run on main lines. They were also subject to a detailed inspection every ten years.
- On 30 November 1926, a passenger train overran signals at Upney, Essex and was in a rear-end collision with another. Of 604 people injured, only four are hospitalised.
- In June 1928, a mail train was derailed at Swinderby, Lincolnshire.
- On 2 July 1928, a goods train was derailed at Pinwherry, Renfrewshire due to excessive speed on a curve.
- On 27 August 1928, a passenger train crashed into buffers at Euston, London, injuring 30 people.
- In August 1928, a train was derailed at Ashton under Hill, Worcestershire.
- On 25 October 1928, a goods train broke down at Dinwoodie, Dumfriesshire. An express passenger train was in a rear-end collision with it due to errors by the guard of the goods train and a signalman. Four people were killed and five were injured.
- On 8 January 1929, an express passenger train from Bristol, Somerset to Leeds, Yorkshire when it overran signals at Ashchurch, Gloucestershire and collided with a goods train that was being shunted. Four people were killed.
- On 2 February 1929, a passenger train was sent into the bay platform at Bridgeton Cross, Glasgow, due to a signalman's error. Several people were injured when the train crashed through the buffers.
- On 12 February 1929, an express passenger train was in a head-on collision with a goods train at Doe Hill station, Derbyshire due to a signalman's error. Two people were killed.
- On 6 March 1930, a passenger train departed from Culgaith station, Cumberland against signals. It subsequently collided with a ballast train at Langwathby, Cumberland. Two people were killed and four were seriously injured.
- On 22 March 1931, an express passenger train was derailed at Leighton Buzzard, Bedfordshire due to excessive speed through a crossover. The locomotive crew were killed.
- On 17 July 1931, a mail train overran signals and was in a rear-end collision with a goods train at Crich Junction, Derbyshire. Two people were killed and seventeen people were injured.
- On 18 December 1931, a goods train became divided at Dagenham Dock, Essex. Due to a signalman's error, a passenger train ran into the rear portion of the goods. Two people were killed and several were injured.
- On 17 June 1932, a passenger train was derailed at Great Bridgeford, Staffordshire.
- On 10 July 1933, an express passenger train was in collision with a goods train and was derailed at Little Salkeld, Cumberland due to a signalman's error. One person was killed and about 30 were injured, one seriously.
- On 6 September 1934, two passenger trains were in a head-on collision at Port Eglington Junction, Glasgow, Renfrewshire after the driver of one of them misread signals. Nine people were killed and 31 were injured, eleven seriously.
- On 28 September 1934, an express passenger train was in a rear-end collision with a passenger train at Winwick Junction, Cheshire due to a signalman's error. Eleven people were killed and nineteen were injured.
- On 25 February 1935, a passenger train was derailed at Ashton under Hill due to a combination of locomotive design, speed and track condition. One person was killed.
- On 13 March 1935, an express meat train from Liverpool to London was brought to a halt at Kings Langley due to a defective vacuum brake. Due to a signalman's error a milk train ran into its rear. Wreckage spread across all four lines, with the result that a few minutes later the Camden to Holyhead freight collided with the debris, followed a few seconds later by the Toton to Willesden coal train. All four lines were blocked for some time and the driver of the milk train was killed. Contemporaneous newsreel footage shows the aftermath of the four-fold accident.
- On 23 February 1937, an express goods train was derailed at West Hampstead, Middlesex.
- On 17 November 1937, a passenger train overran signals and was in a rear-end collision with an express passenger train at Coppenhall Junction, Crewe, Cheshire.
- On 21 January 1938, an express passenger train was in a head-on collision with an empty stock train at Oakley Junction due to a combination of driver and signalman's errors. Three people were killed and 46 were injured.
- On 5 August 1939, a passenger train was derailed at Saltcoats North station, Ayrshire due to an obstruction on the line. Four people were killed.
- On 28 September 1939, a rear-end collision occurred at Winwick Junction.
- On 14 October 1939, An express passenger train was involved in a collision at Bletchley, Buckinghamshire. Five people were killed, more than 30 were injured.
- On 13 October 1940, an express passenger train collided with a platform barrow obstructing the line at Wembley Central, Middlesex and was derailed. Several people were killed and many more were injured.
- On 4 September 1942, a goods train overran a loop at Todmorden, Yorkshire in blackout conditions and was derailed.
- On 21 July 1945, an express passenger train overran signals at Ecclefechan, Dumfriesshire and was in collision with a goods train that was being shunted. Two people were killed, 31 were injured.

- On 30 September 1945, an express passenger train was derailed at Bourne End, Hertfordshire due to excessive speed through a set of points. Forty-three people were killed and 64 were injured.
- 1946 – Lichfield rail crash; 20 killed and 21 injured.
- On 12 April 1947, a passenger train was derailed near Keighley, Yorkshire when a bridge collapsed under it.
- On 21 July 1947, an express passenger train was derailed at Grendon, Warwickshire due to defective track. Five people were killed and 64 were injured.

== Non-railway interests ==
=== Canals ===
The LMS owned many canals, originally acquired by some of its constituent companies in the 19th century, such as the Shropshire Union group (which included the Montgomeryshire Canal, Ellesmere Canal and Chester Canal), originally owned by the London and North Western Railway, and the Trent and Mersey Canal, owned by the North Staffordshire Railway. Many were abandoned by an act of Parliament, the London Midland and Scottish Railway (Canals) Act 1944 (8 & 9 Geo. 6. c. ii), instigated by LMS, including the Ulverston Canal, the Leek branch of the Cauldon Canal, the Shrewsbury Canal, Montgomery Canal, and parts of the Huddersfield Narrow Canal, Cromford Canal, and Ashby Canal. The act transferred the small unclosed part of the Huddersfield Canal to the Calder and Hebble Navigation. Those LMS-owned canals surviving in 1948 passed to the Docks and Inland Waterways Executive of the British Transport Commission, and eventually to the British Waterways Board. The British Waterways Act 1988 (c. xxv) allowed British Waterways to re-open the acts closed by the 1944 act for pleasure use.

=== Shipping ===
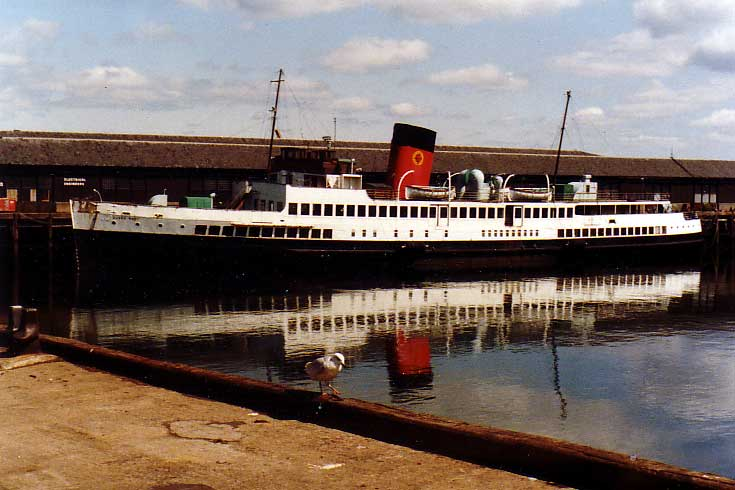
The TS Queen Mary. This ship was part of the LMS Clyde steamer fleet from 1935 to 1947.

The LMS acquired numerous docks, harbours and piers from its predecessors. These ranged in size from major ports at Barrow-in-Furness and Grangemouth through ferry harbours such as Holyhead, Heysham, Stranraer and Fleetwood to much smaller facilities including piers on the Thames and Clyde. The LMS also inherited steamers and piers from the Furness Railway on Windermere and Coniston Water.

Ships inherited from the Midland Railway.

Ship	Launched	Tonnage (GRT)	Notes and references
SS Antrim	1904	2,100	Sold in 1928 to the Isle of Man Steam Packet Company. Scrapped at Preston in November 1936
SS City of Belfast	1893	1,055	Bought from Barrow Steam Navigation Co Ltd in 1907. Sold in 1925 to a Greek owner, renamed Nicolaos Togias. Renamed Kephallina in 1933. Sank on 13 August 1941 off the Egyptian coast.
SS Duchess of Devonshire	1897	1,265	Sold in 1928 to Bland Line, Gibraltar, renamed Gibel Dersa. Scrapped in 1949 at Málaga, Spain.
SS Londonderry	1904	2,086	Sold in 1927 to Angleterre-Lorraine-Alsace, renamed Flamand. Scrapped at Altenwerder, Germany in 1937.
SS Wyvern	1905	232	Built as a tug, used for pleasure excursions from Heysham to Fleetwood until the Second World War. Scrapped in 1960.

The LMS also inherited docks at Goole.

=== Road transport ===
In 1933, along with the other three main line railways, the LMS purchased the Hay's Wharf Cartage Company Ltd., the owners of Pickfords, and Carter Paterson. Subsequently, the LMS acquired Joseph Nall & Co. of Manchester and a 51% stake in Wordie & Co. of Glasgow. The LMS operated a road haulage fleet consisting of 29,754 road vehicles.

=== Hotels ===
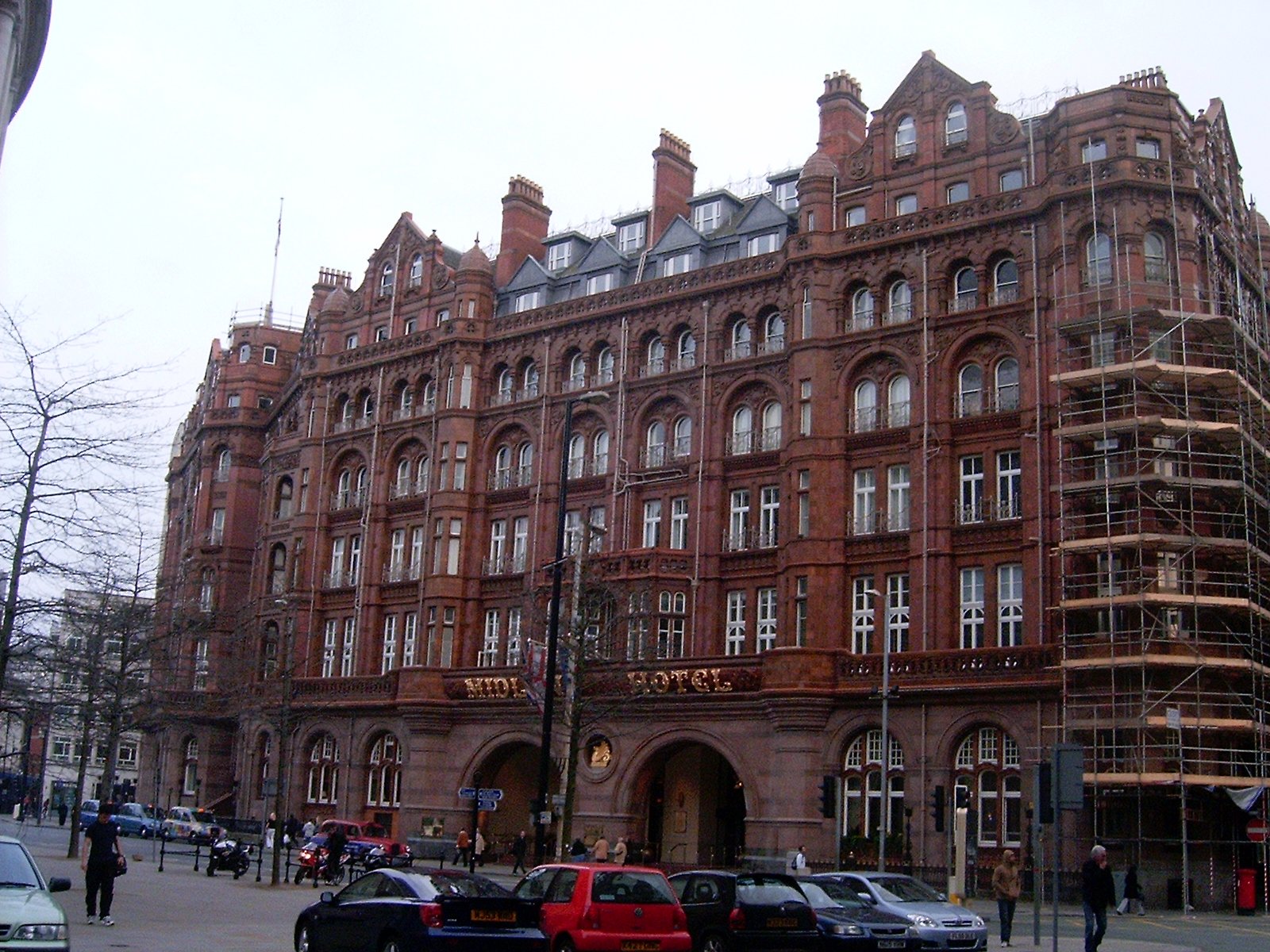
The Midland Hotel, Manchester; one of many hotels formerly owned and operated by the LMS.

The LMS Hotels & Catering Service, apart from providing catering cars on trains and refreshment facilities at stations also operated a chain of nearly 30 hotels throughout the United Kingdom. Just prior to World War II the department employed 8,000 staff, served over 50 million customers per annum and grossed more than £3 million in receipts (equivalent to £169,540,000 in 2025) from the combined hotel and catering operations. The scale of the undertaking enabled the LMS to claim that they operated the largest chain of hotels in the British Empire.

The range of hotels was extensive ranging from large resort and city centre hotels to much smaller provincial establishments. One of the most famous was the Midland Hotel in Morecambe, which had been rebuilt as an Art Deco landmark, as had the Queens Hotel in Leeds. While most were open all year round, a number opened for only particular months in the year, to coincide with local tourist seasons.

== Notable people ==
=== Chairmen of the board of directors ===
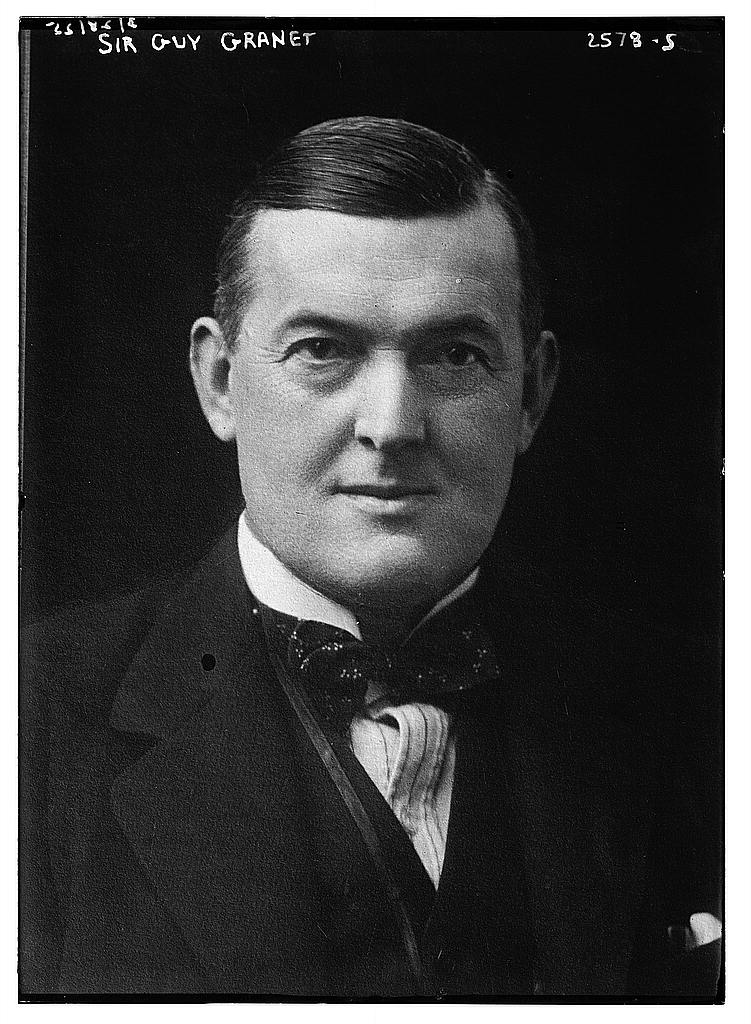
Sir Guy Granet, Chairman of the LMS between 1924 and 1927

- 1923–1924: Charles Lawrence, 1st Baron Lawrence of Kingsgate
- 1924–1927: Sir Guy Granet
- 1927–1941: Josiah Stamp (Baron Stamp from 1938)

=== Presidents ===
- 1926–1941: Josiah Stamp (Baron Stamp from 1938)
- 1941–1947: Sir William Valentine Wood

=== Chief civil engineer ===
- Ernest Frederic Crosbie Trench 1923 – 1927 (formerly chief engineer of the London and North Western Railway)
- Alexander Newlands 1927 – 1933
- William Kelly Wallace 1933 – 1948 (previously Locomotive and Civil Engineer [combined] of the Northern Counties Committee in Northern Ireland.)

=== Chief mechanical engineers ===
- 1923–1925: George Hughes
- 1925–1931: Henry Fowler
- 1931–1932: Ernest Lemon
- 1932–1944: Sir William Stanier
- 1944–1945: Charles Fairburn
- 1945–1947: Henry George Ivatt

== Legacy ==
The name of the LMS was revived by Govia in the form of the train operating company London Midland which operated services primarily around the West Midlands and services north to Liverpool Lime Street and south to London Euston between 2007 and 2017.

LMS was trademarked by the Department for Transport on 14 November 2017 sparking speculation of the name becoming the long term branding for the new InterCity West Coast Partnership franchise, which is scheduled to commence operations on 8 December 2019, branded as Avanti West Coast.
