= Simultaneous death =

Issue in inheritance law

Simultaneous death is a problem of inheritance which occurs when two people (sometimes referred to as commorientes) die at, or very near, the same time, and at least one of them is entitled to part or all of the other's estate on their death. This is usually the result of an un-natural death occurring from events such as an accident, a homicide, or a murder-suicide.

Under the common law, if there was any evidence whatsoever that one party had survived the other, even by a few moments, then the estates would be distributed in that order. However, the decedents could write (or have written) a clause in the will that requires their property to be distributed as though each had predeceased the other.

Some wills now include Titanic clauses (named for the RMS Titanic, which caused many simultaneous deaths among testators and executors). These clauses lay out explicit instructions for dealing with simultaneous death.

== United States ==
To alleviate problems of proving simultaneous death, many states in the United States have enacted the Uniform Simultaneous Death Act, which provides that each spouse will be treated as though they predeceased the other if they die within 120 hours of one another, unless a specific clause in the will deals with this particular possibility.

The Act also states that the 120-hour rule is not applicable if the result would be that the estate is intestate, and would therefore be escheated to the state.

== England and Wales ==
The common law provision that, without evidence, there can be no presumption as to which of the commorientes died first, was superseded by the passage of the Law of Property Act 1925, Section 184. Under this statute, where the order of death of two persons is uncertain, the elder of the two is deemed to have died first. This can cause difficulties where for example the elder person had children prior to marriage. The rules can be ousted if inappropriate by an explicit provision in a will.

An example is the death in 1941 of Josiah Stamp, 1st Baron Stamp, said to be the second richest man in England, and his son Wilfred Stamp, who died together when Josiah's house was bombed in the Blitz. The family paid death duty twice, and Wilfred is counted as the second Baron Stamp though he held that title for only an instant.

Wills generally have a survivorship clause, typically of 30 days, so that both partner's estates are dealt with as though they were already widowed at the point of death; in cases of intestacy, the survivorship clause is set at 28 days.

It is HM Revenue and Customs's longstanding practice to apply a concessionary treatment for inheritance tax purposes in such cases which reduces the burden on surviving family members.

== Switzerland ==
The only case where a dead person can inherit from another deceased person occurs when there is a provable time span between their deaths. If it cannot be reliably ascertained who died first, courts will assume that all involved persons have died at exactly the same time. So, in case of commorientes, nobody will inherit from the other person.

== Denmark ==
In cases where two persons, who stand to inherit one another, die in circumstances where it cannot be determined who died first, neither party is assumed to have survived the other.
