= Tuddenham =

Village in Suffolk, England

Coordinates: 52.31433°N 0.546398°E

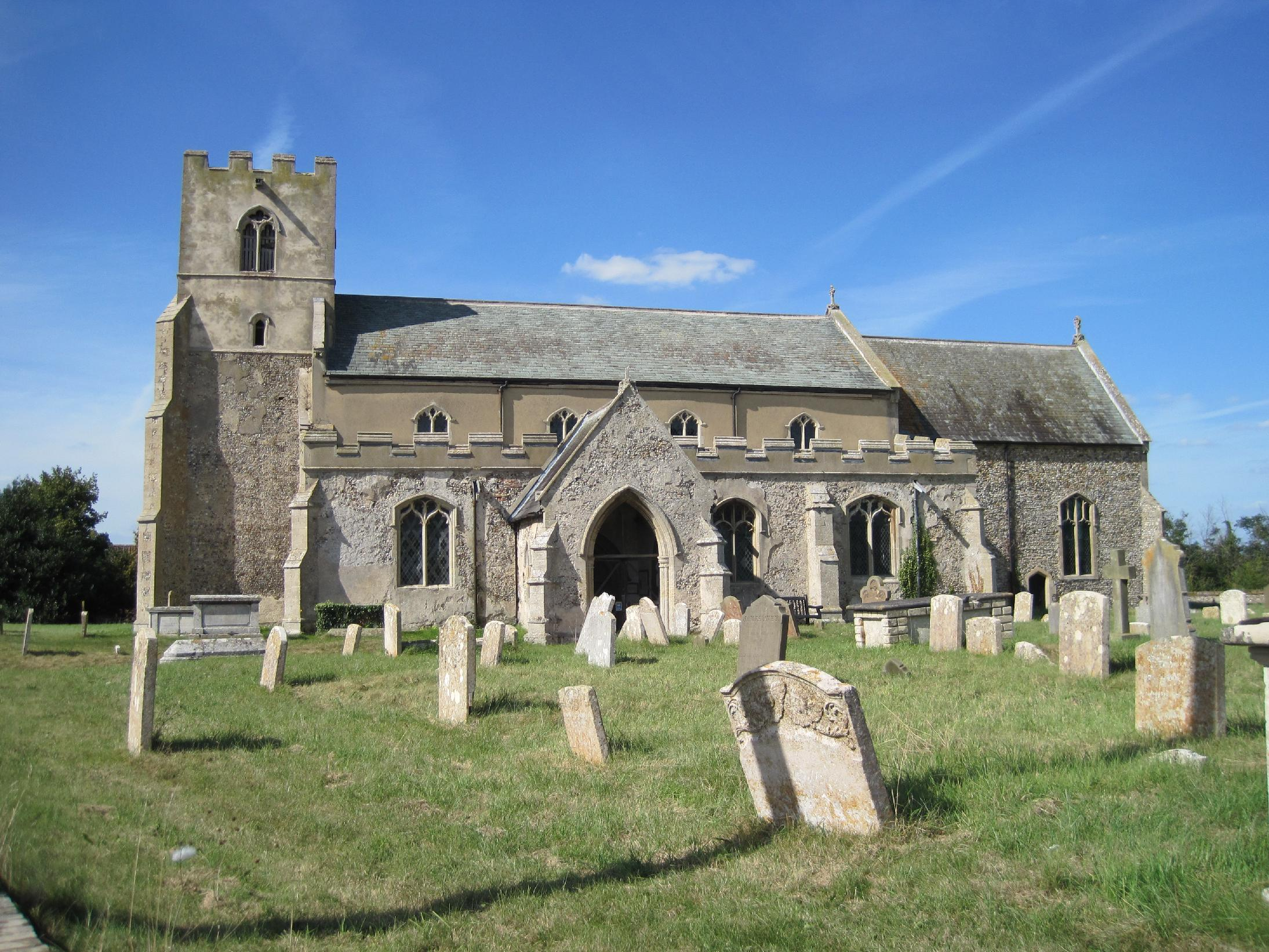
- Tuddenham, Church of St Mary

- Location within Suffolk
- Population: 450 (2005)
- District: West Suffolk
- Shire county: Suffolk
- Region: East
- Country: England
- Sovereign state: United Kingdom
- Post town: Bury St Edmunds
- Postcode district: IP28
- Police: Suffolk
- Fire: Suffolk
- Ambulance: East of England
- UK Parliament: West Suffolk

Tuddenham is a village and civil parish in the West Suffolk district of Suffolk in eastern England. In 2005 it had a population of 450. falling to 423 at the 2011 Census.

== RAF Tuddenham ==
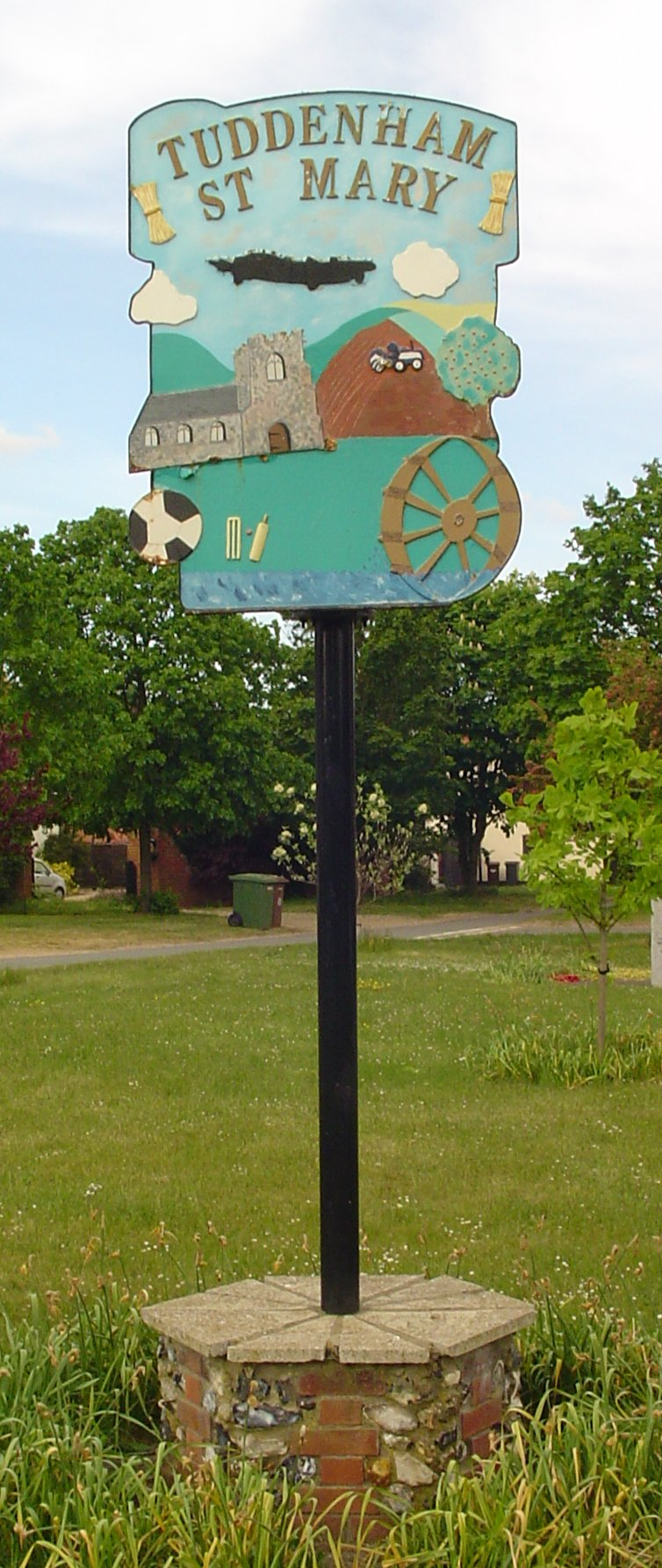
Signpost in Tuddenham

Between 1943 and 1963, RAF Tuddenham was a Royal Air Force station close to the village. During the Second World War, Short Stirling and Avro Lancasters Squadrons were stationed at the base, and between 1959 and 1963, 107 Squadron operated three Thor nuclear missiles. Today, the site has been returned to agricultural use, and little remains of the airfield facilities.

== Local features ==
The nearby Cavenham Heath National Nature Reserve is breeding ground of stone curlews and woodlarks.

The Icknield Way Path passes through the village on its 110-mile journey from Ivinghoe Beacon in Buckinghamshire to Knettishall Heath in Suffolk. The Icknield Way Trail, a multi-user route for walkers, horse riders and off-road cyclists also passes through the village.

== Notable residents ==
- Charles James Blomfield (1786-1857), clergyman and classicist, Bishop of Chester (1824–1828), and Bishop of London (1828-1856).
- Mesac Thomas (1816-1892), clergyman, and inaugural Bishop of Goulburn (1863-1892).
- Joseph Thomas Last (1849-1933), missionary, explorer and naturalist.
