= Uniform Simultaneous Death Act =

Uniform act for inheritance in the United States

The Uniform Simultaneous Death Act is a uniform act enacted in some U.S. states to alleviate the problem of simultaneous death in determining inheritance.

The Act specifies that, if two or more people die within 120 hours of one another, and no will or other document provides for this situation explicitly, each is considered to have predeceased the others. However, the Act contains a clause that states if the result would be an intestate estate escheating to the state, the 120-hour rule is not to be applied.

The Act was promulgated in 1940, when it was adopted by all 48 then-existing states. It was last amended in 1993. As of 2010, 19 states (Alaska, Arizona, Arkansas, Colorado, Hawaii, Kansas, Kentucky, Massachusetts, Montana, New Hampshire, New Mexico, New York, North Carolina, North Dakota, Ohio, Oregon, South Dakota, Utah, Virginia, and Wisconsin), as well as the District of Columbia and the Virgin Islands have explicitly adopted the Act in its current version. A number of other states have indirectly adopted the Act as part of the Uniform Probate Code.

== Inheritance ==
The Act primarily helps to determine the heirs of a person who has died intestate. For example, Alice and Bob are a married, retired couple with no offspring. They die in a plane crash, and it cannot be determined which person died first. Neither had executed a will, so both Alice's and Bob's families claim inheritance of the couple's estate. The court uses the Uniform Simultaneous Death Act to resolve the dispute. In accordance with the Act, Alice is considered to have predeceased Bob, but Bob is also considered to have predeceased Alice. The inheritance is divided equally among their closest living relatives, according to degree of kinship.

The 120-hour period is intended to simplify estate administration by preventing an inheritance from being transferred more times than necessary. For example, assume that the Act does not exist. Alice dies immediately, but Bob dies in the hospital the next day. Because Bob outlives Alice, he would inherit her estate, and Bob's heirs would inherit the combined estate the next day. This would increase the legal costs involved, and cause Alice's estate to be subject to tax twice: once alone, and once as part of Bob's. However, if tax was paid in Alice's estate, Bob's would receive a Federal Estate Tax credit for the same property transferred by Alice (state death and inheritance tax provisions may differ). Under the Act, neither inherits the other's estate, each is taxed separately, and their heirs inherit both estates once.

== Insurance ==
The Act may also help to resolve a life insurance case where the insured and beneficiary die in a common disaster. Different rules apply for insurance. For example, Carol has a life insurance policy through her employer. Her husband Dave is its beneficiary. They are both killed in a car crash, dying at or near the same time. If Carol has named a secondary beneficiary in her policy, that person will receive the life insurance benefit.
