= Baron Stamp =

Barony in the Peerage of the United Kingdom

- Crest: Issuant from a mount Vert bezantée a demi-horse Argent.
- Shield: Gules between two garbs Or three bezants in bend each charged with a horse passant Sable.
- Supporters: On either side a horse Argent resting the interior hind leg on a bezant.
- Motto: Fidei Commissa Teneo

Baron Stamp, of Shortlands in the County of Kent, is a title in the Peerage of the United Kingdom. It was created in 1938 for the civil servant, industrialist, economist, statistician and banker, Sir Josiah Stamp. The second Baron, Wilfred Carlyle Stamp, holds the record for having held a peerage for the shortest length of time. On 16 April 1941, the first Baron Stamp was killed by a German bomb, as was his son Wilfred. Legally, the son was presumed to have died a fraction of a second after his father, and therefore is supposed to have succeeded to the title for that short amount of time. The second Baron was succeeded by his younger brother, the third Baron. As of 2022 the title is held by the latter's grandson, the fifth Baron.

== Barons Stamp (1938) ==
- Josiah Charles Stamp, 1st Baron Stamp (1880–1941)
- Wilfred Carlyle Stamp, 2nd Baron Stamp (1904–1941)
- Trevor Charles Stamp, 3rd Baron Stamp (1907–1987)
- Trevor Charles Bosworth Stamp, 4th Baron Stamp (1935–2022)
- Nicholas Charles Trevor Stamp, 5th Baron Stamp (b. 1978)

The heir apparent is the present holder's son the Hon. Leo Charles Xie Stamp (b. 2021).
