= Josiah Stamp, 1st Baron Stamp =

British industrialist, economist, politician, and writer (1880–1941)

The Right Honourable The Lord Stamp GCB GBE FBA
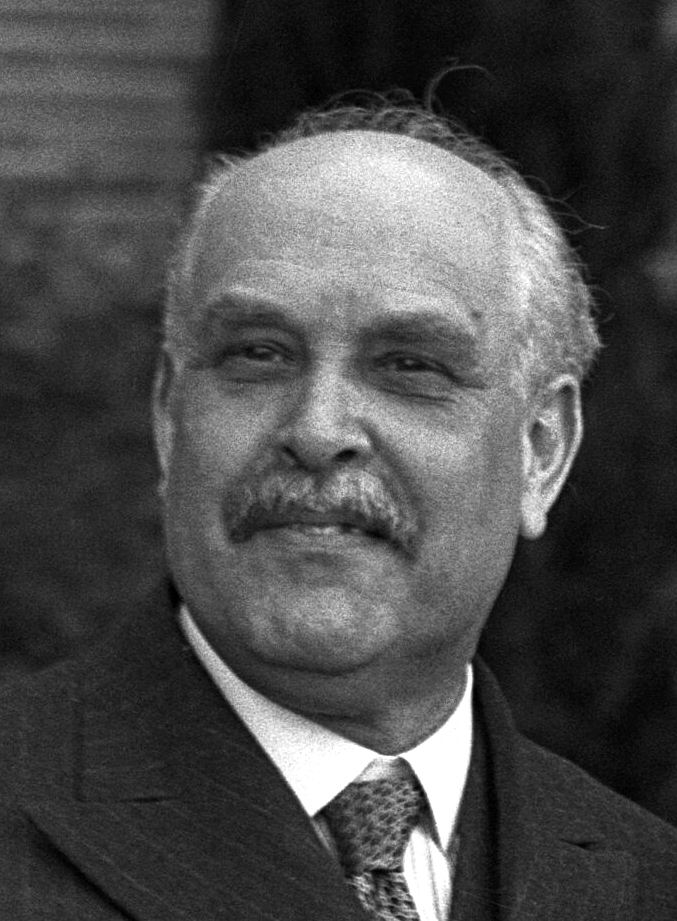
- Stamp in 1935
- Born: 21 June 1880; Hampstead, London, England
- Died: 16 April 1941 (aged 60); Shortlands, London, England

Josiah Charles Stamp, 1st Baron Stamp (21 June 1880 – 16 April 1941) was an English industrialist, economist, civil servant, statistician, writer, and banker. He was a director of the Bank of England and chairman of the London, Midland and Scottish Railway.

== Life and career ==
Stamp was born in Hampstead, London, the third of seven children; his youngest brother L. Dudley Stamp was known as a geographer. At the time of his birth his father owned and managed a provision and general shop in London.

Stamp was educated at Bethany School, Goudhurst in Kent. He left at 16 and joined the Civil Service as a boy clerk in the Inland Revenue Department. With a brief interval in the Board of Trade, he rose to assistant inspector of taxes at Hereford in 1903, an inspector of taxes in London in 1909, and assistant secretary in 1916.

Meanwhile, Stamp was studying economics as an external student. He was awarded a first class degree (1911) by the University of London and a doctorate (1916) by the London School of Economics. The thesis, published as British Incomes and Property, became a standard work on the subject and established his academic reputation. In 1919 he changed career, leaving the civil service for business, to join as secretary and director of Nobel Industries Ltd, from which Imperial Chemical Industries developed. In 1926 he became Chairman of the LMS and was instrumental in getting William Stanier appointed in 1932 as Chief Mechanical Engineer to resolve the locomotive problems of the company. In 1928 he was appointed a director of the Bank of England.

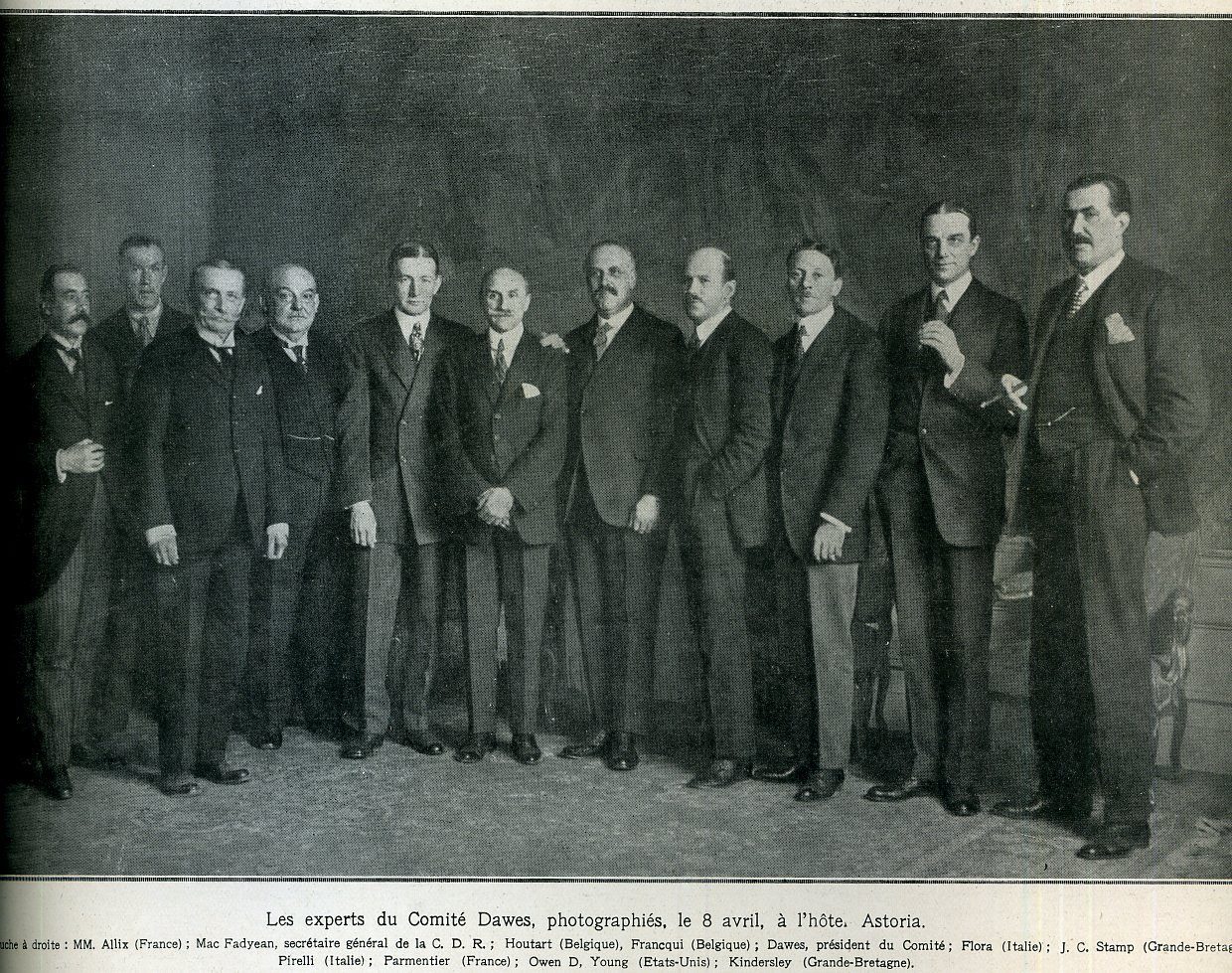
The Dawes Committee, chaired by Charles G. Dawes (Josiah Stamp 7th from left).

Stamp was often called to serve on public commissions, committees and boards: he was a member of the Royal Commission on Income Tax, 1919, the Northern Ireland Finance Arbitration Committee, 1923–24, the Committee on Taxation and National Debt, 1924, the Dawes Reparation Commission's Committee on German Currency and Finance, 1924, the Young Committee in 1929 and the Economic Advisory Council, 1930–39. In 1935, he was a founding member of the Anglo-German Fellowship and had made low key visits to Nuremberg in 1936 (when he met Adolf Hitler – whom Stamp noted was a "statesman and demagogue combined" – and Franz von Papen), and 1937, to view the Nazi Party Congress with the unspoken support of the then Foreign Secretary Lord Halifax. Stamp expressed sympathy for Nazi Germany, saying he supported "reasonable counteraction of Jewish domination."

From 1927 until his death, Stamp was Colonel commanding the Royal Engineers Railway and Transport Corps, and became Honorary Colonel of Transportation Units in the Royal Engineers Supplementary Reserve in 1938.

Stamp was widely regarded as the leading British expert on taxation, and took an active part in the work of the Royal Statistical Society, serving as president from 1930 to 1932.

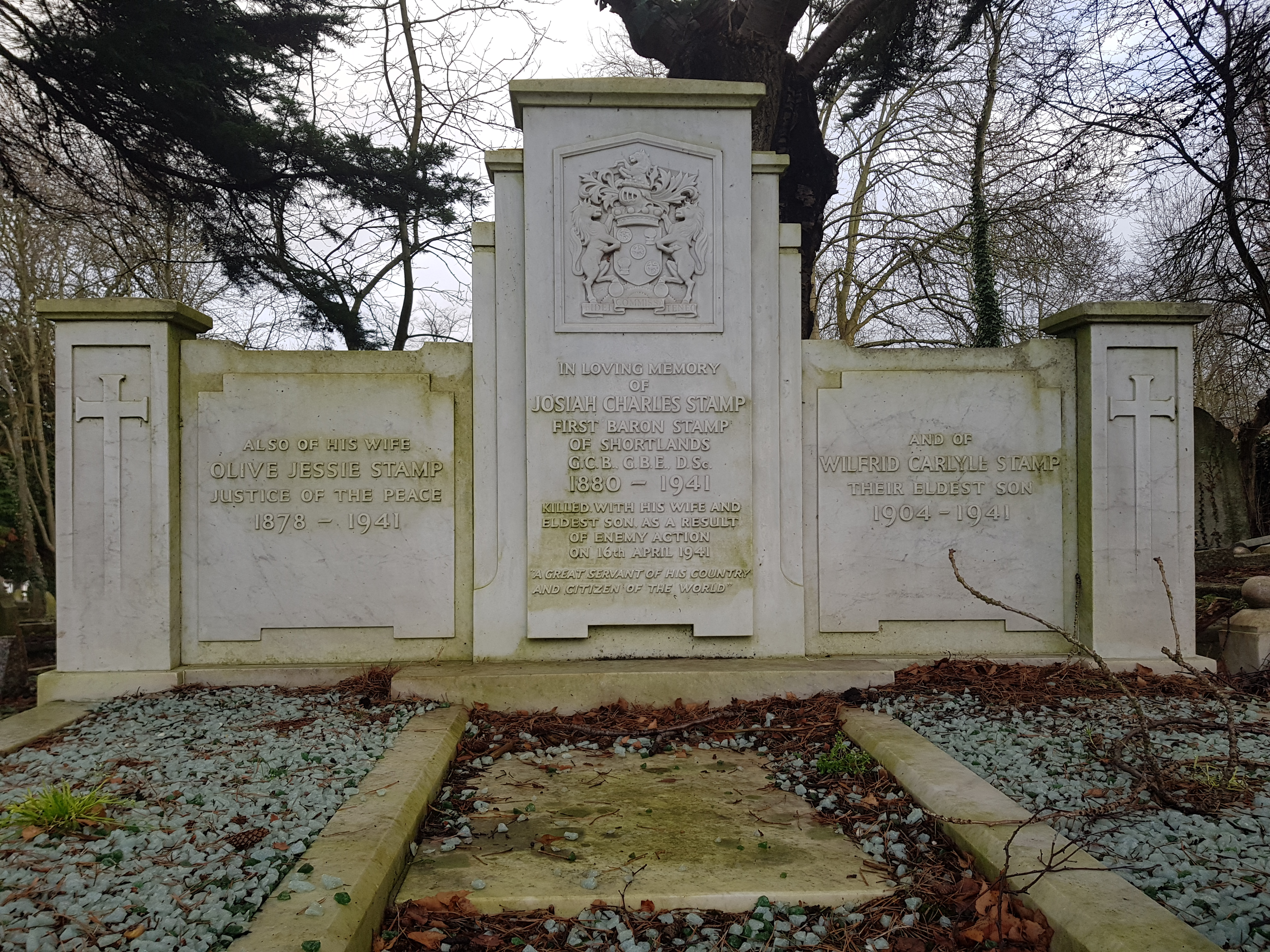
Grave of Josiah, Olive and Wilfrid Stamp, Beckenham Cemetery

Stamp refused to be moved out of his house, 'Tantallon', in Park Hill Road, Shortlands, during the German bombing of The Blitz. He, aged sixty, and his wife, aged sixty-three, were killed by a bomb's direct hit on the air-raid shelter at their home on 16 April 1941. They were buried at Beckenham Cemetery. Stamp was regarded to be the second wealthiest man in Britain at the time of his death.

== Honours and awards ==
Stamp was invested as a Commander of the Order of the British Empire (CBE) in 1918, Knight Commander of the Order (KBE) in 1920, and Knight Grand Cross (GBE) in the 1924 Birthday Honours and Knight Grand Cross of the Bath (GCB) in 1936. He was a Knight of Grace of the Order of St John of Jerusalem. He also held the Grand Cross of the Austrian Order of Merit (awarded 1936) and the Afghan Order of Astaur. He was raised to the peerage on 28 June 1938 as Baron Stamp, of Shortlands in the County of Kent.

Stamp was elected an International Honorary Member of the American Academy of Arts and Sciences in 1933 and an International Member of the American Philosophical Society.

He was first Mayor of the Borough of Beckenham, Kent, within which he had settled at Shortlands, in 1935. He was made an honorary Freeman of the same borough in 1936 and of Blackpool in 1937. In 1936, he served as President of the Geographical Association; his brother L Dudley Stamp, also became President of the Association, in 1950.

== Family ==
Stamp met his future wife, Olive Jessie Marsh, a soprano and student teacher, when he was seventeen. Pursuing their work and studies separately for several years until their marriage in 1903, they engaged in a correspondence (Jones 1964). Between 1904 and 1917 they had four sons, Wilfred, Trevor, Maxwell and Colin. It was as a result of this marriage that Stamp, son of a Baptist father and Church of England mother, converted to the Wesleyan Methodist Church. A few of his writings (see below), such as Christianity and Economics (1939), discuss the relevance of Christian values to contemporary economics systems.

Stamp's son Wilfred was killed at the same time and in the same place as his father, but English law has a legal fiction that in the event of the order of deaths being indeterminable, the elder is deemed to have died first. Legally therefore, Wilfred momentarily inherited the peerage: and as a consequence the family had to pay death duty twice. The peerage passed to the second of Stamp's four sons, Trevor.

== Arms ==
Coat of arms of Josiah Stamp, 1st Baron Stamp
| Crest Issuant from a mount vert bezantée a demi-horse argent. Escutcheon Gules between two garbs or three bezants in bend each charged with a horse passant sable. Supporters On either side a horse argent resting the interior hind leg on a bezant. Motto Fidei Commissa Teneo (I hold in trust that which is trusted to me) Orders Order of the Bath - Knight Grand Cross (GCB); Order of the British Empire - Knight Grand Cross (GBE) |

== Quotes ==
A well known quote from Stamp (often referred to as Stamp's Law) is:

"The government are very keen on amassing statistics. They collect them, add them, raise them to the nth power, take the cube root and prepare wonderful diagrams. But you must never forget that every one of these figures comes in the first instance from the chowky dar (village watchman in India), who just puts down what he damn pleases." (Stamp recounting a story from Harold Cox who quotes an anonymous English judge).

Another quote attributed to Stamp is:

"Banking was conceived in iniquity and was born in sin. The bankers own the earth. Take it away from them, but leave them the power to create money, and with the flick of the pen they will create enough deposits to buy it back again. However, take away from them the power to create money and all the great fortunes like mine will disappear and they ought to disappear, for this would be a happier and better world to live in. But, if you wish to remain the slaves of bankers and pay the cost of your own slavery, let them continue to create money." (Said to be from an informal talk at the University of Texas in the 1920s).

== Sources ==
- A. L. Bowley Lord Stamp Journal of the Royal Statistical Society, Vol. 104, No. 2 (1941), pp. 193–196.
- J. Harry Jones, M.A., LL.D., Josiah Stamp, Public Servant: The Life of the First Baron Stamp of Shortlands, London: Sir Isaac Pitman and Sons, 1964, 365 pp. With an Epilogue by his youngest son, Colin, from a talk broadcast over Springbok Radio from Johannesburg, South Africa, 5 October 1960.

== Books by Josiah Stamp ==
Sourced from Who Was Who.

- British Incomes and Property 1916
- Wealth and Income of the Chief Powers 1919
- The Fundamental Principles of Taxation 1921
- The National Income 1924 with A. L. Bowley 1927
- The Christian Ethic as an Economic Factor 1926
- On Stimulus 1927
- Some Economic Matters in Modern Life 1929
- Criticism and other addresses 1931
- Internationalism 1931
- The Financial Aftermath of War 1932
- Taxation During the [Great] War 1932
- Ideals of a Student 1933
- Motive and Method in a Christian Order 1936
- The National Capital and Other Statistical Studies 1937
- The Science of Social Adjustment 1937
- We live and learn 1937
- Christianity and Economics 1939

Peerage of the United Kingdom
| New creation | Baron Stamp; 1938-1941 | Succeeded by Wilfred Stamp |
