= Trevor Stamp, 4th Baron Stamp =

British physician and peer (1935–2022)

Trevor Charles Bosworth Stamp, 4th Baron Stamp, FRCP (18 September 1935 – 20 October 2022) was a British medical doctor and hereditary peer.

Like his father, Trevor Stamp, 3rd Baron Stamp, he was educated at The Leys School and Gonville and Caius College, Cambridge, before going on to postgraduate study at Yale University and further medical training at St Mary's Hospital. He was consultant physician and director of the Department of Bone and Mineral Metabolism, Institute of Orthopaedics, at the Royal National Orthopaedic Hospital, 1974–1999, and has been honorary consultant physician (retired) since then. He succeeded his father as Baron Stamp in 1987. The House of Lords Act 1999 removed the right of hereditary peers to sit in the House of Lords.

Stamp married twice

1. Anne Carolynn Churchill, with whom he had two children, Hon. Catherine Stamp and Hon. Emma Stamp
2. Carol Anne Russell, with whom he had two children, Hon. Lucinda Stamp and Nicholas Charles Trevor, 5th Baron Stamp.

Stamp died on 20 October 2022, at the age of 87.

== Arms ==
Coat of arms of Baron Stamp
Crest Issuant from a mount vert bezantée a demi-horse argent. Escutcheon Gules between two garbs or three bezants in bend each charged with a horse passant sable. Supporters On either side a horse argent resting the interior hind leg on a bezant. Motto Fidei Commissa Teneo (I hold in trust that which is trusted to me).

== Sources ==
- ‘STAMP’, Who's Who 2012, A & C Black, 2012; online edn, Oxford University Press, Dec 2011; online edn, Nov 2011 accessed 23 Feb 2012
- http://www.debretts.co.uk/people/biographies/browse/s/3621/Trevor%20Charles%20Bosworth%20Stamp+STAMP.aspx

Peerage of the United Kingdom
Preceded by Trevor Stamp	Baron Stamp; 1987–2022	Succeeded by Nicholas Stamp
