= Shortlands =

Coordinates: 51.3983°N 0.0039°E

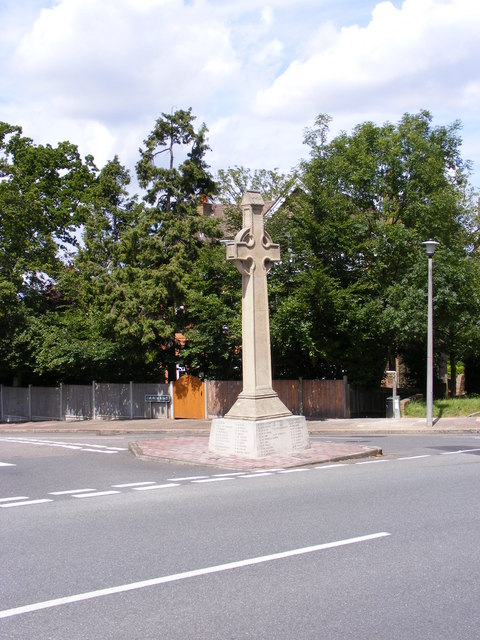
- The Shortlands war memorial

- Location within Greater London
- Population: 9,303 (ward, 2001 census); 9,824 (2011 Census. Ward)
- OS grid reference: TQ395685
- London borough: Bromley
- Ceremonial county: Greater London
- Region: London
- Country: England
- Sovereign state: United Kingdom
- Post town: BROMLEY
- Postcode district: BR2
- Dialling code: 020
- Police: Metropolitan
- Fire: London
- Ambulance: London
- UK Parliament: Beckenham & Penge
- London Assembly: Bexley and Bromley

Shortlands is a suburb of South East London, England, within the London Borough of Bromley. It has been part of Greater London since 1965, and was previously part of the historic county of Kent. It is located between west of Bromley and east of Beckenham.

== History ==
The earliest known settlement in the area was an Iron Age hillfort at Toots Wood, where traces of a Roman Camp and pottery has also been found. Dr Peter D. Moore has performed a pollen analysis at the site which suggest that the site was abandoned before the beginning of the Roman occupation.

Historically, Shortlands was known as Clay Hill. In medieval times the areas consisted of sets of long and short fields, called Longelonds and Shortelonds, the latter ultimately giving its name to Shortlands House (later converted into a hotel, and then a part of Bishop Challoner School) which was built at the start of the 18th century. The house with its extensive farmland was acquired in 1848 by a railway magnate William Wilkinson, who also built several cottages for his farm labourers. Housing development began in the 1860s with the sale of the Shortlands House estate, spurred by the opening of Shortlands railway station in 1858. The housing along Westmoreland Road largely dates to the 1880s, with further development occurring in the 20th century.

Pearson & Cox was a British automobile manufacturer in Shortlands, trading from 1908 to 1916. In 1913 they manufactured both steam-powered vehicles (cars and bicycles) and petrol powered cyclecars.

In 1921, a war memorial, designed by W. D. Caroe in the form of a Celtic cross, was unveiled in the village, in the middle of a road junction.

Shortlands is today a quiet, prosperous suburb. There is a library on Shortlands Road and a small row of shops by the railway station.

== Transport ==
=== Rail ===
Shortlands station is in London fare zone 4 of Transport for London’s zonal fare system, and serves the area with National Rail services to London Victoria via Herne Hill, as well as Orpington. Shortlands is also served by Thameslink to London Blackfriars via Catford, (during peak hours these trains continue to Luton via St Pancras International); as well as to Sevenoaks via Swanley. As of 2025, the station also houses a coffee shop and accessible facilities are being developed.

=== Buses ===
Shortlands is served by London Buses routes 162, 227, 354, 358, 367 and N3. These connect it with areas including Beckenham, Bromley, Bromley Common, Locksbottom, Farnborough, Green Street Green, Keston, Park Langley, Eden Park, Chislehurst, Bickley, Eltham, New Eltham, Croydon, Shirley, Addiscombe, Crystal Palace, Elmers End, Anerley, Penge and Orpington.

Route 162, and the N3 night bus between Oxford Circus and Bromley North serve Shortlands via Hayes Lane at the Scotts Lane, Den Close and Hayes Lane/Kingswood Road bus stops.

The nearest Tramlink station is Beckenham Junction, which serves the western termini Wimbledon, as well as Mitcham Junction, West Croydon and East Croydon stations.

== Education ==
The main schools in Shortlands are Valley Primary School, Highfield Infant and Junior Schools, Harris Academy Shortlands and Clare House Primary School. Bishop Challoner School closed in 2025.

== Sports and leisure ==
AFC Shortlands, a youth football club for children aged between 5 and 18, are based at Queensmead Recreation Ground on Glass Mill Lane, Shortlands.

== Notable people ==
- Enid Blyton (1897–1968), children's author, commemorated by a blue plaque on 83 Shortlands Road where she lived part of her life.
- Harold Bride (1890–1956), the wireless operator aboard RMS Titanic, lived at 58 Ravensbourne Avenue from 1903–1922, commemorated by a blue plaque on the property.
- Sir John Brown (1816–1896), Victorian-era industrialist, died at Shortlands House.
- Grahame Clark (1907–1995), archaeologist who specialised in Mesolithic Europe and palaeoeconomics, grew up in Shortlands.
- Dinah Craik (1826–1887), novelist, lived and died in Shortland.
- John Ossian Davies (1851–1916), the Welsh Congregationalist minister, died here.
- Thomas Charles Dewey (1840–1926), President of the Prudential Assurance Company and philanthropist, commemorated by a blue plaque on 1 South Hill Road where he lived for much of his life.
- George Grote (1794–1871), eminent historian of Greece, was born here at Shortlands House when it was known as Clay Hill.
- General Sir Reginald Hewetson, (1908–1993) British Army officer.
- Charles Keeping (1924–1988), illustrator, children'sauthor and lithographer, lived at 16 Church Road where there is a plaque commemorating him.
- Joseph Thomas Last (1849–1933), English missionary, explorer and naturalist, died here.
- Alexander Muirhead (1848–1920), electrical engineer, credited with recording the first human electrocardiogram, lived and died on Church Road.
- Brian Murphy (1932–2025), actor, known for playing George Roper in the sitcom George and Mildred, lived in Shortlands with his wife Linda Regan (see below).
- Linda Regan (born 1949), actress and author, lived in Shortlands with her husband Brian Murphy (see above).
- Peter Ricketts, Baron Ricketts (born 1952), former Permanent Secretary to the Foreign and Commonwealth Office, created Baron Ricketts, of Shortlands in 2017.
- Lord Stamp of Shortlands (1880–1941), the first Chartered Mayor of Beckenham and Chairman of the London, Midland and Scottish Railway. lived and died here when his house on Park Hill Road was bombed in 1941.
- John Veale (1922–2006), English classical composer, born here.
- Charles Paget Wade (1883–1956), English architect, artist-craftsman and poet, was born in Shortlands.

== Gallery ==
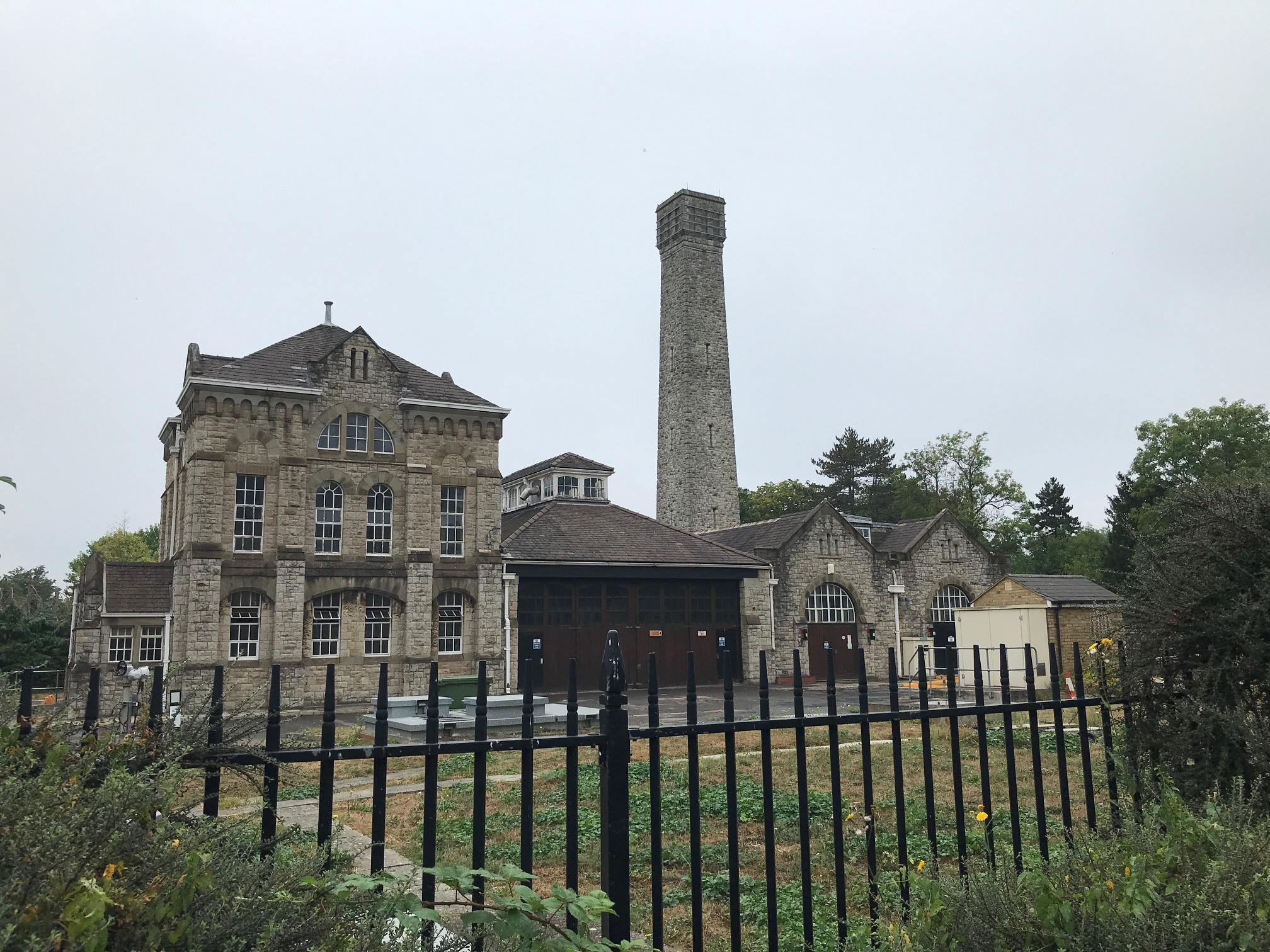
The listed Pumphouse

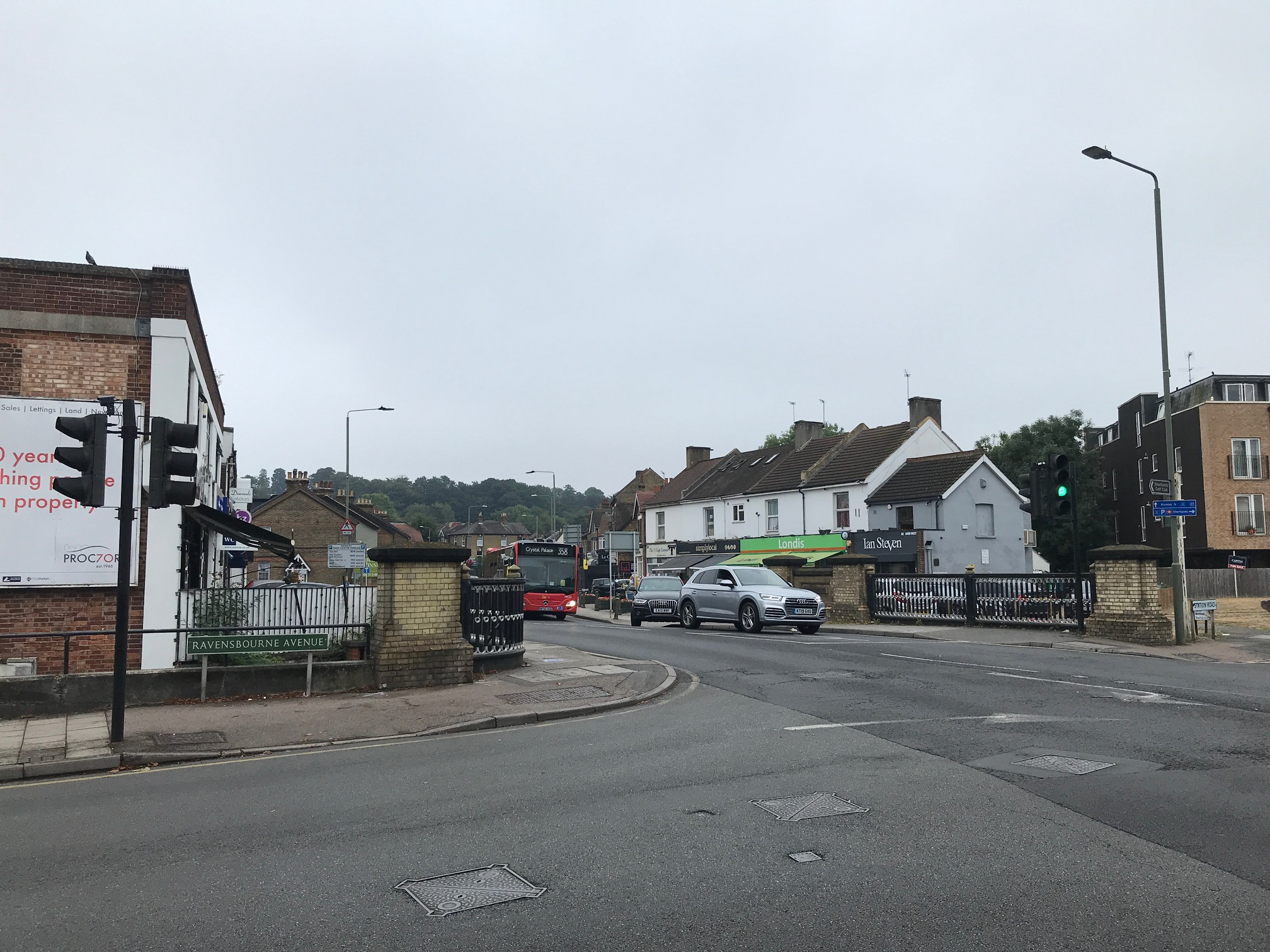
Shops by the railway station

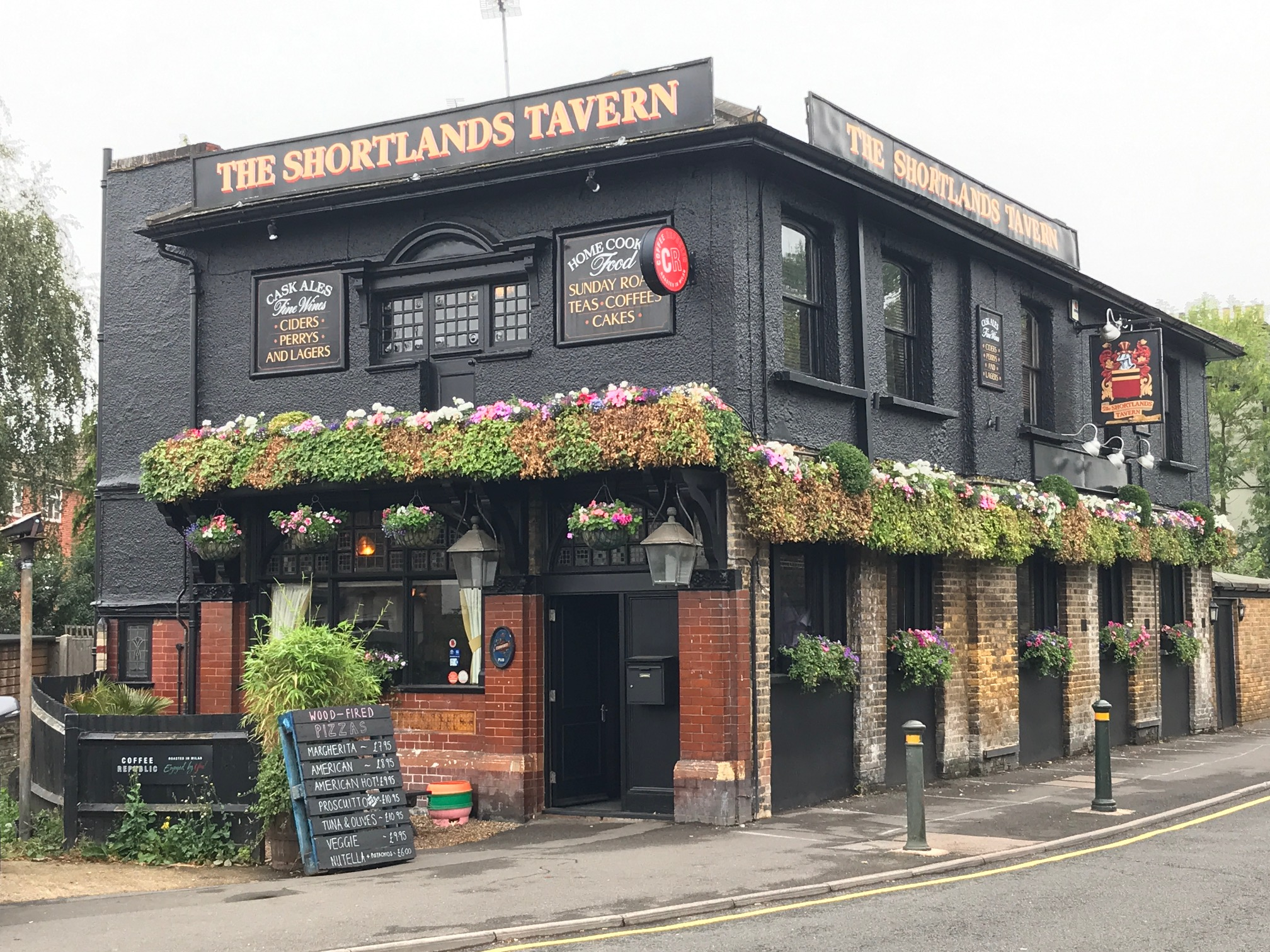
Shortlands Tavern

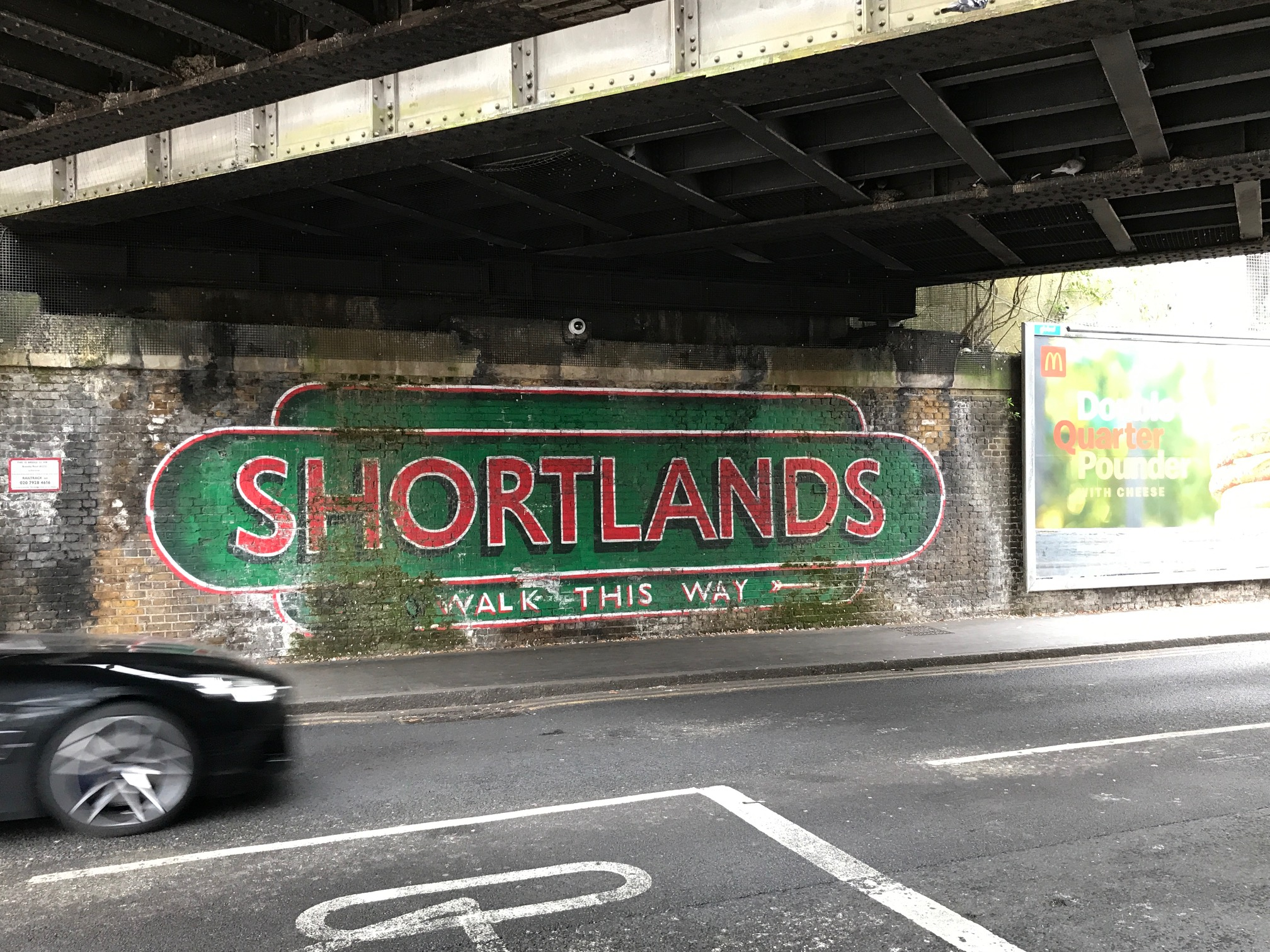
Bridge under the railway station

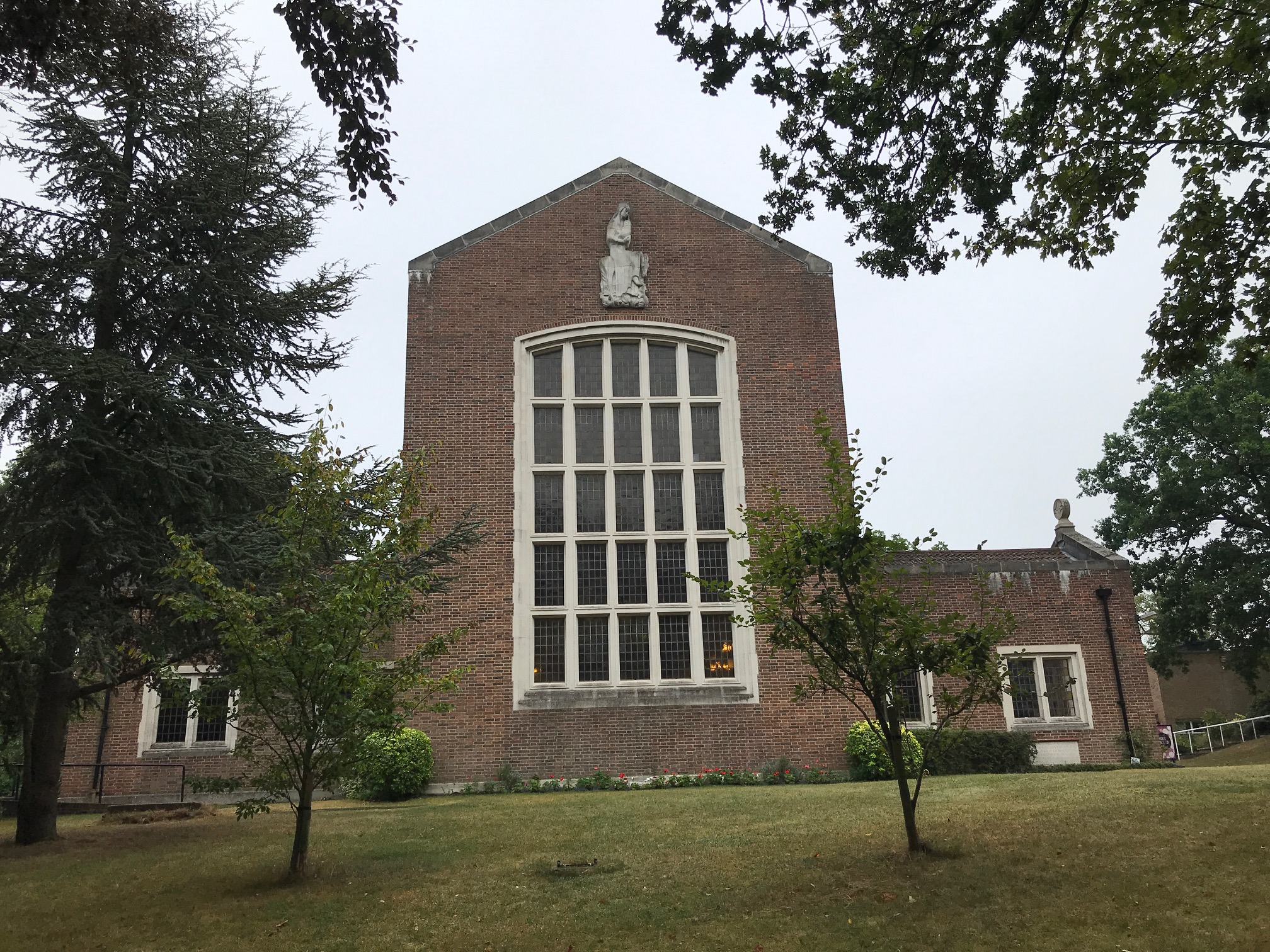
St Mary's Church

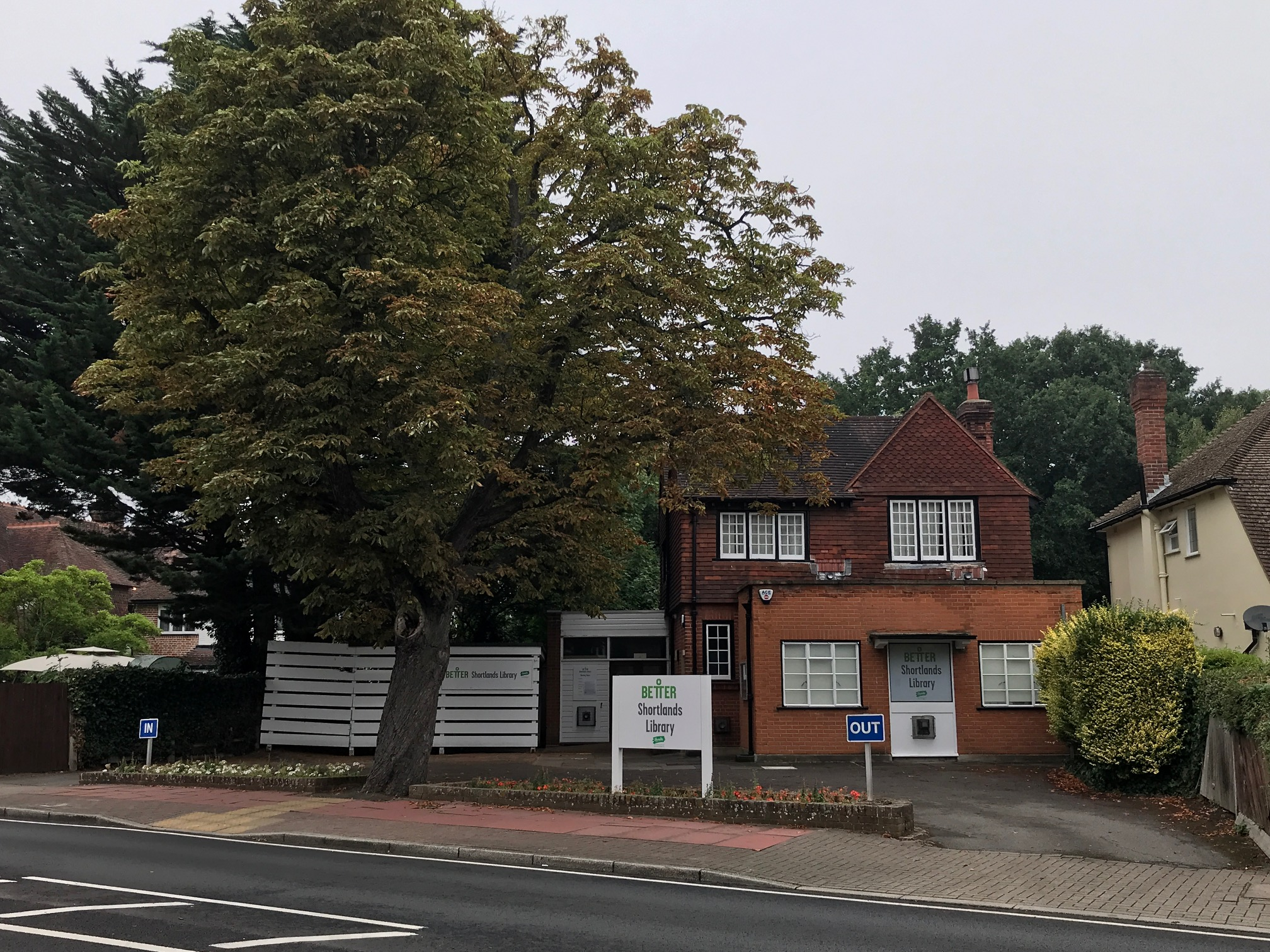
Shortlands Library
