= Partnership taxation in the United States =

The rules governing partnership taxation, for purposes of the U.S. Federal income tax, are codified according to Subchapter K of Chapter 1 of the U.S. Internal Revenue Code (Title 26 of the United States Code). Partnerships are "flow-through" entities. Flow-through taxation means that the entity does not pay taxes on its income. Instead, the owners of the entity pay tax on their "distributive share" of the entity's taxable income, even if no funds are distributed by the partnership to the owners. Federal tax law permits the owners of the entity to agree how the income of the entity will be allocated among them, but requires that this allocation reflect the economic reality of their business arrangement, as tested under complicated rules.

== Background ==
While Subchapter K is a relatively small area of the Internal Revenue Code, it is as comprehensive as any other area of business taxation. The recent emphasis by the Internal Revenue Service (IRS) to stop abusive tax shelters has brought about an onslaught of regulation.

Aggregate and entity concept
The Federal income taxation of partners and partnerships is set forth under Subchapter K covering Sections 701–777 of the Code. Subchapter K represents a blending of the Aggregate and Entity concepts.
Aggregate concept
An aggregate concept looks at a partnership as a collection of partners and treats each partner as if he owned an undivided interest in the partnership assets and its operations. For tax purposes, under this concept, a partnership is not a person, it cannot be sued or sue. It is merely a conduit passing income through to the partners for reporting on their individual tax returns. "The aggregate approach reflects the underlying notion that the partnership form generally should affect the tax treatment of the partners as little as possible. Thus it is useful to compare the treatment of a similar non-partnership transaction under general income tax principles."
Entity concept
An entity concept on the other hand looks at a partnership as a separate entity for tax purposes with partners owning equity interest in the partnership as a whole. This treatment is similar to corporations entity approach. Thus a partnership for tax purposes is a person, it can sue and be sued and can conclude legal contracts in its own name. The entity concept governs the characterization "income, gain, losses and deductions from the partnership operations, are initially determined at entity level. These items are then passed through to the partners through their distributive shares."

== Taxation based on type of Partnership ==
In the absence of an election to the contrary, multi-member limited liability companies (LLCs), limited liability partnerships (LLPs) and certain multi-member trusts are treated as partnerships for United States federal income tax purposes. Certain non-U.S. entities may also be eligible for treatment as partnerships. Individual states of the United States do not universally accord "flow-through" taxation to partnerships, and some distinguish among different kinds of entities that are treated the same under federal tax principles (e.g. Texas taxes LLCs as corporations, while according flow-through treatment to partnerships). Local jurisdictions may also impose their own taxes on entities taxed as partnerships at the federal level (e.g., New York City unincorporated business tax).

Certain threshold issues bear mentioning here: (1) members of an LLC, or partners in a partnership which has elected to be treated as a partnership for Federal income tax purposes, may use a proportionate share of the partnership debt in order to increase their "basis" for the purpose of receiving distributions of both profits and losses; (2) members and/or partners must be "at risk" pursuant to; and (3) they must actively participate pursuant to.

There is little published authority on these matters. On the issue of material participation in LLCs there are only the Gregg (U.S.D.C. Oregon 2000) and Assaf cases. These cases generally seem to agree that the least onerous test for qualifying for material participation for an LLC member is the same as that for a General Partner in a Limited Partnership, or 100 hours annually.

== Determination of distributive share ==
A partner's distributive share of the partnership's income or loss, and its deductions and credits, is determined by the partnership agreement. However, the partner's distributive share is measured by their partnership interest if the partnership agreement does not provide for such a distributive share, or the allocation under the partnership agreement does not have substantial economic effect. The partnership interest can be discerned through an analysis of the capital accounts of the partners to determine in what proportion to the rest of the partnership each partner contributed capital to the partnership.

=== Substantial economic effect tests ===
The determination of "substantial economic effect" for allocations is split into two main tests. The first is called the economic effects test. The second is the substantiality test. Both tests are complicated and require a detailed examination in the Treasury regulations 1.704-1(b).

==== Economic effects test ====
The fundamental principle for the economic effects test is that for an allocation to have economic effect it must be consistent with the underlying economic arrangement of the partners. The partner must bear the economic benefit, or burden, of the allocation. There are now three methods, or "tests," for determining whether an allocation has economic effect.

The first test is the primary test referred to as the safe harbor test, which requires the execution of three conditions:

1. Maintenance of partners' capital accounts in accordance with Reg. 1.704-1(b)(2)(iv);
2. Liquidation distributions are required in all cases to be made in accordance with the positive capital account balances of the partners.
3. Lastly, if a partner has a deficit balance in their capital account following the liquidation of their interest in the partnership, then they are unconditionally obligated to restore the amount of such deficit balance to the partnership by the end of such taxable year.

The test above works for general partners in a partnership, but not for limited partners. Limited partners, by the nature of having limited liability, do not have to pay back deficits. Instead, there is another test called the "alternative economic effects test" that follows the first two requirements, but replaces the last requirement. The alternative effects test requires that, instead of a deficit restoration obligation, the partnership agreement provides for a qualified income offset provision. A "qualified income offset" is a provision requiring that partners who unexpectedly receive an adjustment, allocation, or distribution that brings their capital account balance negative, will be allocated all income and gain in an amount sufficient to eliminate the deficit balance as quickly as possible.

However, if the allocation fails the safe harbor and alternative economic effects tests, the allocation may still have economic effect through the economic effect equivalence test. Partnerships failing the two economic effect tests above will still be deemed to have economic effect, provided that as of the end of each partnership taxable year a liquidation of the partnership at the end of the year or at the end of any future year would produce the same economic result to the partners as would occur had the test above been satisfied. Since a hypothetical liquidation would create the same results, the economic effect is preserved. This is most useful during transitional stages of the partnership.

==== Substantiality test ====
Substantiality is the second part of the substantial economic effects test. Generally, an allocation is substantial if there is a reasonable possibility that the allocation will affect substantially the dollar amounts to be received by the partners from the partnership independent of the tax consequences.

An allocation is not substantial if at the time the allocation becomes part of the partnership agreement, (1) the after-tax economic consequences of at least one partner may be enhanced compared to such consequences if the allocation was not contained in the partnership agreement, and (2) there is a strong likelihood that the after-tax consequences of no partner will be substantially diminished compared to such consequences if the allocation was not contained in the partnership agreement.

The idea here is that the IRS is looking for partnerships whose sole goal is to improve the tax situation of the partners. This is effectively the definition of a tax shelter.

=== Capital accounts ===
The partnership must maintain the capital accounts of the partners in order to pass the economic effects test because many of the determinations for proper allocations rely on well-maintained capital accounts for discerning the partners' interests.

Generally, partners' book capital accounts reflect the value of each partner's interest in the partnership. Thus, capital accounts serve to reconcile the entitlements and obligations of the partners upon liquidation. For example, if all partnership assets were sold for a fair market value and all liabilities were paid, the remaining cash, if any, would be equal to the partner's equity in the partnership at fair market value. Tax capital accounts are partners' "outside basis" (however, unlike the outside basis, the partnership's recourse and nonrecourse liabilities are not included in partners' tax-basis capital accounts) and under Section 722 are initially determined by reference to the partner's contributed cash amount and the adjusted basis of the contributed property. Thereafter, other allocations that either increase or decrease a partner's basis will be reflected in the account. A partner's outside basis is separate and distinct from the partnership's inside basis. Under Section 723, a partnership's inside basis is the adjusted basis of the contributed property or the value of the contributed cash. "Generally the sum of the partner's outside basis will equal to the partnership's inside basis in its assets".

==== Example ====
A, B, and C are equal partners in ABC partnership. A contributes $50,000 cash, B contributes equipment with a basis of $15,000 and a FMV of $30,000 and C contributes land with a basis of $25,000 and a FMV of $35,000. Immediately after the contributions, ABC partnership's balance sheet would show the following assuming that ABC has no liabilities at formation:

Assets
The total basis of all assets is $90,000, representing the contributed properties in the partnership's hands. This is ABC partnership's "inside basis". Representing the book value of the partnership assets, the total value of all assets is $115,000.
Equity
The total basis is $90,000, which represents the partners' tax capital accounts or the "outside basis" of the properties contributed. Lastly, the total of all book capital accounts is $115,000, representing the partners book capital accounts. Book capital accounts reflect partners' equal contributions and equal rights to any liquidation distributions.

==== Increases ====
The basic rules provide for increases to be made in a partner's capital account for their monetary contributions, the fair market value of property the partner contributed, and undistributed allocations of partnership income.

==== Decreases ====
The basic rules provide for decreases to be made in a partner's capital account for money distributed to them, allocations of expenditures, and the allocations of personal property loss and deductions.

==== Assumption and contribution of recourse liabilities ====
Recourse liabilities assumed by the partner are treated as money contributed to the partnership, which increases the partner's capital account in the same manner as money. Meanwhile, recourse liabilities that other partners assume from the contributing partner shall decrease their capital account in the same manner as money.

==== Assumption and contribution of nonrecourse liabilities ====
A partnership liability is a nonrecourse liability if no partner or related person has an economic risk of loss for that liability. A partner's share of nonrecourse liabilities is generally proportionate to their share of partnership profits. However, this rule may not apply if the partnership has taken deductions attributable to nonrecourse liabilities or the partnership holds property that was contributed by a partner.

For more information on the effect of partnership liabilities, including rules for limited partners and examples, see sections 1.752-1 through 1.752-5 of the regulations.

=== Loss limitation ===
There is a limitation on the deduction of a partner's distributive share of partnership losses. A partner may deduct their loss only to the extent of their adjusted basis in the partnership. Any excess of such loss over basis is allowed as a deduction at the end of the partnership year in which such excess is repaid to the partnership.

=== Gain recognition ===
==== Capital contributions ====
When a partner contributes capital to the partnership, neither the partnership, nor the contributing partner, or any other partner, recognizes gain or loss by the mere fact of contributing property for an interest in the partnership (Sec. 721). Instead, the value of contributions is reflected in the capital accounts, which defers taxation until distributions are made to the contributing partner.

Treas. Reg. §1.721-1 provides that this non recognition rule applies for contributions to new and to already existing partnerships. Also, unlike the requirements of Sec. 351 in the corporate world, there is no demand for control (80%) immediately after the transaction and there is no minimum percentage of interest that the contributing partner must acquire for the non-recognition rule of Sec. 721 to apply.

To qualify for non-recognition treatment it is, however, essential, that a partner makes the contribution acting in their capacity as partner, not as individual (this would fall under Sec. 707), and that they receive in exchange solely an interest in the partnership.

Generally, the contributing partner's basis in the partnership interest corresponds to the adjusted basis of the property in their hands at the time of contribution plus the amount of money contributed (Sec. 722). The holding period of the partnership interest includes the contributing partner's holding period of the transferred asset if it was a capital asset in their hands (Sec. 1223(1)). If it was an ordinary asset in their hands, the holding period of the partnership interest begins the day after the contribution.

The term "property" includes cash, tangible and intangible property, but "services" are specifically excluded. Generally, a partnership interest can be acquired in exchange for services, but this transaction does not qualify under Sec. 721. With the transfer of services rather than property, the transaction results in taxable income to the contributing partner under Sec. 61 and Sec. 83. The partnership can afterwards deduct the payment as operating costs.

Promissory notes, such as third party notes and installment notes, qualify as property under Sec. 721. The adjusted basis of a third party note is zero in the hands of the contributing partner and therefore, their new basis in the partnership interest upon contribution will be zero. The basis of the contributing partner is increased accordingly with each payment that is made on the note. Under Reg. 1.721-1(a) also the contribution of installment obligations to the partnership in exchange for a partnership interest qualify for non-recognition treatment.

Granting the mere right to use property is considered "property" for purposes of Sec. 721 only in very limited cases, such as the right of usage over a sufficiently long time period.

On the other hand, a partner can contribute ordinary income assets, like unrealized receivables or inventory items. The most common example of unrealized receivables contributed to a partnership are accounts receivable. This is often the case for cash basis taxpayers.

Similar to promissory notes, the initial basis of the accounts receivable is zero and, therefore, the basis in the partnership for the contributing partner is zero upon the contribution. Income resulting from contributed accounts receivable will then be allocated to the contributing partner.

Under Sec. 724, however, the character of gain or loss on specific kinds of contributed property is preserved. Therefore, should the partnership later dispose of the accounts receivable, the amount realized will be treated as ordinary income or loss, regardless of how long the partnership holds the receivables (Sec. 724(a)).

The same is true for the contribution of inventory. It qualifies as property under Sec. 721, but, if the property was inventory to the contributing partner, it will retain its character for five years after the contribution (Sec. 735(a)(2)). This means, any gain or loss realized by the partnership upon disposition within the time-frame of five years is treated as ordinary gain or loss (Sec. 724(b)).

Since inventory and accounts receivable are ordinary income assets in the hands of the taxpayer, they trigger the recognition of ordinary gain upon disposition. Sec. 724 was enacted to prevent the conversion of ordinary income property to capital gain property.

==== Service contributions ====
If a partner contributes services for capital interest in the partnership, then that interest is taxable, should it be subject to ready valuation. If a partner contributes services for a profits interest, then that interest is not taxable upon the date of the exchange because any valuation would be too speculative unless it is for an asset that has low risk and a guaranteed return like a Treasury bill or the partner sells that interest within two years of the exchange.

Recently the Treasury proposed a safe harbor valuation procedure whereby a "service provider" (a partner who contributes services for a partnership interest) may be taxed on the valuation of the fair market value of the liquidation value of the property received. According to this proposal a service provider will likely pay a tax on the receipt of a capital interest because it is subject to a liquidation valuation. Meanwhile, a profits interest has no liquidation value because only capital interests have interests in the liquidation of capital, instead, the profits interest is just the speculative value of a share in future profits.

==== Distributions ====
When a partner receives a distribution, they may not recognize gain up to the adjusted basis of their capital account in the partnership. They recognize gain to the extent that the distribution exceeds their adjusted basis in the capital accounts of their partnership interest. However, the partner may treat the distribution as a "draw", which does not become a distribution until the last day of the partnership's taxable year. This gives the partner time to bump-up their adjusted basis in the partnership and avoid the 731(a)(1) gain.

== Partner's share of partnership liabilities ==
A change in a partner's share of partnership liabilities increases or decreases the partner's outside basis in the partner's partnership interest. An increase in a partner's share of partnership liabilities increases the partner's outside basis because the assumption by the partner of a share of partnership debt is considered a deemed contribution to the partnership. Similarly, a decrease in a partner's share of partnership liabilities decreases the partner's outside basis because the partner being relieved of liability for a share of partnership debt is considered a deemed distribution to the partner.

=== Recourse liabilities ===
A partnership debt is considered a "recourse" liability to the extent any partner bears the economic risk of loss if the debt comes due and the partnership is unable to satisfy the obligation. A partner's share of a recourse liability, then, is the share for which that partner bears the economic risk of loss.

A partner bears the economic risk of loss to the extent the partner or a related person would be required to contribute to the partnership to satisfy the obligation, determined by way of a "constructive liquidation" analysis. In a constructive liquidation, the following events are deemed to occur:

1. all partnership liabilities become due;
2. all partnership assets become worthless;
3. the partnership assets are sold for no consideration other than relief of the partnership's liabilities;
4. all partnership items are allocated among the partners; and
5. the partners' partnership interests are liquidated, with the partners being required to restore capital account deficits to $0.00.

==== Example ====
A and B each contribute $10,000 in cash to form the AB Partnership. AB buys real property for $120,000, paying $20,000 and giving a recourse note for $100,000. The partnership agreement allocates all items equally to the partners.

To determine each partner's economic risk of loss, a constructive liquidation analysis must be performed. The $100,000 note is deemed to become due. The partnership's assets become worthless and are sold for no consideration. This results in a $120,000 loss to the partnership, which is split equally between A and B. As a result of each A and B taking a $60,000 distributive share of the loss, their respective capital accounts are decreased by $60,000 from $10,000 to ($50,000). To restore these negative capital account balances to $0.00 in a deemed liquidation of their partnership interests, A and B would have to contribute $50,000 each to the partnership. Hence, each A and B bears the economic risk of loss for $50,000 of the partnership's recourse debt. A and B's outside bases, therefore, are increased by $50,000 from $10,000 when AB becomes obligated on the $100,000 note, giving each partner an outside basis of $60,000.

=== Nonrecourse liabilities ===
A partnership liability is a nonrecourse liability if no partner or related person has an economic risk of loss for that liability. A partner's share of nonrecourse liabilities is generally proportionate to their share of partnership profits. However, this rule may not apply if the partnership has taken deductions attributable to nonrecourse liabilities or the partnership holds property that was contributed by a partner. For more information on the effect of partnership liabilities, including rules for limited partners and examples, see sections 1.752-1 through 1.752-5 of the regulations.

== Federal tax regulations, revenue rulings, and other pronouncements ==
The Internal Revenue Service publishes a substantial number of official pronouncements called revenue procedures (Rev. Procs.) and revenue rulings (Rev. Rul.), and both temporary and permanent regulations annually. IRS website on Partnerships

== See also ==
- Partnership taxation
- Partnership accounting
- IRS
