= Charging order =

English court order against judgment debtors

A charging order, in English law, is an order obtained from a court or judge by a judgment creditor, by which the property of the judgment debtor in any stocks or funds or shares in a limited liability company or land stands charged with the payment of the amount for which judgment shall have been recovered, with interest and costs.

== History ==
Before the advent of the charging order, a creditor pursuing a partner in a partnership was able to obtain from the court a writ of execution directly against the partnership's assets, which led to the seizure of such assets by the sheriff. This result was possible because the partnership itself was not treated as a juridical person, but simply as an aggregate of its partners. The seizure of partnership assets was usually carried out by the sheriff, who would go down to the partnership's place of business and shut it down. That caused the non-debtor partners to suffer financial losses, sometimes on par with the debtor partner, and the process was considered to be entirely "clumsy."

To protect the non-debtor partners from the creditor of the debtor-partner it was necessary to keep the creditor from seizing partnership assets (which was also in line with the developing perception of partnerships as legal entities and not simple aggregates of partners) and to keep the creditor out of partnership affairs. These objectives could only be accomplished by limiting the collection remedies that creditors previously enjoyed. The rationale behind the charging order applied initially only to general partnerships, where every partner was involved in carrying on the business of the partnership; it did not apply to corporations because of their centralized management structure. However, over the years the charging order protection was extended to limited partners and LLC members.

== United States ==
Both partnership statutes and limited liability company statutes (in most domestic and foreign jurisdictions that have these entity types) provide for charging orders. In almost all the states, partnership and LLC statutes are based on the uniform acts, such as the Revised Uniform Partnership Act of 1994 ("RUPA"), the Uniform Limited Partnership Act of 2001 ("ULPA") or the Uniform Limited Liability Company Act of 1996 ("ULLCA"), or the earlier versions of these acts. Membership interests in LLCs and partnership interests are afforded a significant level of protection through this charging order mechanism. The charging order limits the creditor of a debtor-partner or a debtor-member to the debtor's share of distributions, without conferring on the creditor any voting or management rights.

Given the historical framework of charging orders, it may be argued that their protection should not extend to single member LLCs (there are no other "partners" to protect from the creditor). However, neither the uniform acts nor any of the state charging order statutes make any distinction between single-member and multi-member LLCs. Some courts have held that the charging order protection would apply in a case where all of the partners of a limited partnership were the debtors of a single creditor. The creditor had argued to no avail that because there were no "innocent" (non-debtor) partners to protect, the charging order protection should not apply.

In in re Albright, 291 B. R. 538 (Bankr. D. Colo. 2003), one bankruptcy court held that the charging order protection does not apply to single-member LLCs. The court concluded that, based on the Colorado LLC statutes, a membership interest in an LLC can be assigned, including management rights. To date, with the exception of the Albright case, there are no cases analyzing the efficacy of charging orders in the single-member LLC context.

Similar to the traditional liability shield commonly associated with limited liability entities, the protection of the charging order may be pierced by a creditor. In that eventually the charging order limitation becomes a moot point, because the entity is no longer considered to have a separate legal identity from its owners. In a state requiring a business purpose, a partnership or an LLC holding personal property may be subject to a reverse piercing claim. Entities holding personal assets should be formed in states like Delaware, that allow entities to be formed for any lawful purpose.

== United Kingdom (England and Wales) ==
The provisions of charging orders in England and Wales are under the Charging Orders Act 1979 (formerly under the Judgment Acts 1838 and 1840)

A charging order can only be obtained in respect of an ascertained sum, but this would include a sum ordered to be paid at a future date. An order can be made on stock standing in the name of a trustee in trust for the judgment debtor, or on cash in court to the credit of the judgment debtor, but not on stock held by a debtor as a trustee.

The application for a charging order is made to the appropriate court normally without notice and considered by a judge without a hearing who will normally make an interim charging order (formerly a charging order nisi) and after a subsequent hearing on notice a final charging order (formerly a charging order absolute) can be made.

In deciding whether to make a charging order the court shall consider all the circumstances and in particular any evidence as to the personal circumstances of the debtor and whether any other creditor would be likely to be unduly prejudiced.

The charging order may be made subject to conditions.

If necessary, a stop order on the fund and the dividends payable by the debtor can be obtained by the creditor to protect his interest.

A solicitor employed to prosecute any suit, matter or proceeding in any court, is entitled, on declaration of the court, to a charge for his costs upon the property recovered or preserved in such suit or proceeding. (See Rules of the Supreme Court, o. XLIX.)

As to court procedure in England & Wales see CPR73 and PD73

== Increase in charging orders as an enforcement action in England and Wales ==
The reality of charging orders is that creditors can secure debts that they lent unsecured. This is often considered controversial, since an unsecured debt typically attracts higher interest, which is considered compensation for the creditor's higher risk. Historically charging orders were a last resort for creditors as the Courts were reluctant to grant them. There has been a significant shift recently though with a huge increase in applications for charging orders and the orders being granted by the court. On Saturday 22 March 2008 the Times reported "The Courts Service received a total of 92,933 applications in 2006, compared with only 16,014 in 2000. In 2006 the courts approved 72 per cent of applications from lenders to secure customers' debts against their homes, up from 60 per cent in 2000." On Sunday 13 April 2008 the Sunday Mirror reported "An alarming 97,017 'charging orders' were made in 2007 - up from 66,911 in 2006." §
