= Partnership (Hong Kong) =

A partnership in Hong Kong is a business entity formed by the Partnerships Ordinance, which defines a partnership as "the relation between persons carrying on a business in common with a view of profit" and is not a joint stock company or an incorporated company. If the business entity registers with the Registrar of Companies it takes the form of a limited partnership defined in the Limited Partnerships Ordinance. However, if this business entity fails to register with the Registrar of Companies, then it becomes a general partnership as a default.

== Limited partnership ==
In a limited partnership the general partners are liable for all debts and obligations of the firm while the limited partners are liable only for the capital they contributed to the firm.

In a limited partnership the general partners manage the firm while the limited partners may not. And should limited partners do so, then they become personally liable for the debts of obligations of the firm in the same manner as a general partner.

Unless a partnership agreement between the partners demand otherwise, (1) a majority of the general partners decide ordinary business matters, (2) a limited partner may assign his partnership interest, (3) a limited partner cannot dissolve a partnership, (4) the introduction of a new partner does not require the consent of the existing limited partners.

== General partnership ==
In a general partnership all partners are general partners so each one is liable for all debts and obligations of the firm.

== See also ==
- Partnership
- Partnership taxation (Hong Kong)
