= SteelPath =

American investment advisory firm

- Industry: Investment
- Founded: 2004
- Founder: Gabriel Hammond
- Defunct: 2012
- Headquarters: Dallas, Texas, United States
- Key people: Gabriel Hammond; Stuart Cartner
- Products: Master limited partnerships
- AUM: ▲US$10.96 billion (2020)
- Parent: Invesco
- Website: https://www.invesco.com

SteelPath was an American investment advisory firm based in Dallas, Texas that specialized exclusively in master limited partnerships ("MLPs"). The company was registered with the U.S. Securities and Exchange Commission as an investment advisor. In 2010, the company received press attention by becoming the first investment advisor to offer open-ended MLP mutual funds. In July 2012, OppenheimerFunds, now Invesco, acquired SteelPath for its MLP business.

== History ==
SteelPath was founded in 2004 as Alerian, by Gabriel Hammond. The company created the Alerian MLP Index (NYSE: AMZ), which was the first of its kind and is now broadly considered to be the benchmark for the Master Limited Partnership asset class. In March 2010, the active management side of the business was re-branded as SteelPath and spun off from Alerian and shortly thereafter created a family of open-ended mutual funds focused on Master Limited Partnerships. Gabriel Hammond, who previously handled MLPs for Goldman Sachs & Co. and Stuart Cartner, also previously with Goldman Sachs, managed all SteelPath funds.

In July 2012, OppenheimerFunds announced they were acquiring SteelPath Capital Management and SteelPath Fund Advisors (“SteelPath”).

== Investment Focus ==
SteelPath was focused exclusively on investing in energy infrastructure through the emerging midstream energy Master Limited Partnerships asset class. These companies are the energy infrastructure analogue to real estate investment trusts (“REITS”), and similarly do not have entity level taxation, while trading on public stock exchanges. MLPs typically distribute a majority of the cash flow generated as distributions to investors and continue to be one of the highest yielding equity asset classes in the US.

== Investment Products ==
Historically, MLPs were difficult for many investors to hold directly, due to the multiple state partnership tax returns (K-1s) that needed to be filed for each MLP. SteelPath was the first investment advisor to launch an open-ended mutual fund focused on MLPs, offering investors access to the space with one 1099 tax return, investment transparency, and no leverage. SteelPath also managed other MLP investment vehicles, including private investment partnerships and separately managed accounts.
