= Partnership taxation (Hong Kong) =

Taxation

Partnership taxation in Hong Kong is the taxation of the profits or losses generated by partnership business entities. First, these profits or losses of the partnership are assessed according to the Hong Kong Inland Revenue Ordinance, Chapter 112, section 22. After assessment, then said profits or losses flow through the partnership to the partners who are then taxed on their share of said profits or losses generated by the partnership without any taxes levied against the partnership.

== Assessment of Partnership ==
The profits or losses of the partnership are assessed in one lump sum by the managing partner or agent. The tax may be recoverable from the assets of the partnership or the partners directly even if the partnership has dissolved.

== Partner's share ==
A partner is taxed according his or her share of the profits or losses generated by the partnership excluding partnership losses brought forward under section 19C.

The partner's share in this partnership is governed by Inland Revenue Ordinance, Chapter 112, section 22B. Said partner's share equals to the sum of contributions made to the partnership as capital less distributions or constructive distributions. Such contributions may also include the partner's share of the profits plowed back into the partnership. The partner's share is then added to the remaining partners to determine the proportionate share amendable also by any partnership agreement.

== See also ==
- Partnership (Hong Kong)
- Partnership
- Inland Revenue Ordinance Cap.112
