= Business ownership within England and Wales =

There are many ways in which a business may be owned under the legal system of England and Wales.

Different types of ownership are suitable for organisations depending on the degree of control the owners wish to have over the business. The choice of ownership method also relates to the organisations ability to raise funds for the business activities. The ownership method also alters the rules under which the company must be administered.

Because ownership is a key part of business planning, it is essential to take into consideration:

- The legal obligations for the owners.
- Appropriate insurance.
- Financial forecasting.

The three main forms of ownership for starting business are: Sole-trader, Partnership and Limited Company.

== Sole trader ==
This is a business where any one person is the owner. Their business is unincorporated so the owner is ultimately personally liable for the business. Sole traders are able to control the business – make all of the decisions. This makes the business highly adaptable. However, raising the capital for such businesses may be quite difficult because it is a risky option for investors.

These businesses are often quite small; however, the number of them is very large. Examples of these businesses are mostly found in the service sector such as electrical repair, retail shops, hotels and driving instructors.

The business is easy to set up, there is no formal procedures and operations can commence immediately (unless there is special permission required). The owner is able to decide the way in which the business operates, as he has the flexibility to restructure or dissolve the business as he sees fit. This enables the organisation to be quickly adaptable. However, competitors which are able to gain capital more quickly are more likely to succeed when there is a need to be more flexible.

Sole traders do not need to keep detailed accounting information, however it may benefit them to as some groups, such as lenders that may require this information. They have to pay taxes themselves, which does require them to keep some information.

Sole traders have unlimited liability, which means that the law does not see them as separate from their business and there is no difference from the money of the business and that of the sole trader; meaning that if the business occurs debts, then so does the owner. This is a key factor to take on, and failure may lead to the loss of possessions and bankruptcy.

== Partnership ==
Partnerships are defined by the Partnership Act 1890 (53 & 54 Vict. c. 39): "The relationship which subsists between persons carrying on a business in common with a view of profit". A partnership is neither incorporated nor registered as a company; generally partnerships consist of ordinary partners who are legally liable for the business.

A benefit of starting a partnership is the ability to raise capital more freely. The business is not reliant upon one person's skills. The business can use different persons strong points to their advantage. This is applicable to accountants – one may be able to give advice easily, whereas the other partner may be more capable of sorting accounts. These partnerships are most prevalent among the professional industries such as architects, doctors, and solicitors.

Partnerships are able to start trading straight away, however, they may need to wait to get the correct licences. If the partnership is trading under a different name other than that of the partners, the organisation must have the names of the partners available to the public; this may mean putting them on documents they must have the name and address at which documents may be served.

Full partnerships consist between two and 20 people, but more commonly, the amount is under six ordinary partners. They are governed by the Partnership Act 1890 which ensures that every partner is equally liable for the business, even if a partner owns just 1% of the organisation. This is why it is important to set out a deed of partnership (partnership agreement) which will outline what each partner has put into the business, what are the responsibilities of each partner, and how they will share the profits and losses.

=== Limited partnerships ===
These are where one or more general partners enter or allow 'limited partners' to go into business with them. Limited partners, often called sleeping partners, have limited liability whereas general partners have full liability arranged in their agreement of partnership.

This type of partnership is governed by the Limited Partnerships Act 1907 (7 Edw. 7. c. 24).

Limited partners may not draw out or receive back any part of their contribution to the partnership during its lifetime, or take part in the management of the business or have power to bind the firm. If they do, they become liable for all the debts, and obligations of the firm up to the amount drawn out or received back or incurred while taking part in the management, as the case may be.

This type of partnership has to be registered with the Registrar of Companies at Company House. Registration is charged at £2.00. The form is LP5; it is the application for registration, and for the statement of particulars, the following information is required.

Name of the firm or partnership
Nature of the business
Principal place of business
The term, if any, for which the partnership is entered into.
If no definite term, the conditions of the existence of the partnership
Date of commencement
Name and address of the general partners
Name and address of the limited partners and the amounts contributed
Signatures of all the partners and the date

Limited partnerships may not normally consist of more than 20 people. However, under section 717 of the Companies Act 1985, there are a number of exceptions to this rule, including:

- A partnership carrying on practice as solicitors and consisting of persons each of whom is a solicitor;
- A partnership carrying on practice as accountants where the partnership is eligible for appointment as a company auditor;
- A partnership carrying on business as members of a recognised stock exchange and consisting of persons each of whom is a member of that exchange;
- A partnership carrying on business as surveyors, auctioneers, valuers, estate agents, land agents, or estate managers and consisting of persons of whom at least three-quarters are members of the Royal Institute of Chartered Surveyors or the Incorporated Society of Valuers and Auctioneers and of whom not more than one-quarter are limited partners;
- A partnership carrying on business as insurance brokers and consisting of persons each of whom is a registered insurance broker or an enrolled body corporate. (For the meaning of 'registered insurance broker' and 'enrolled body corporate' see section 29(1) of the Insurance Brokers (Registration) Act 1977.)
- A partnership which is a collective investment scheme the operator of which, or the manager of the investments of which, is an authorised person under part IV of the Financial Services and Markets Act 2000 or a European Economic Area firm or a treaty firm with permission under the act to operate the scheme or manage the investments.

In a limited partnership, it is the general partner who remains liable for the debts and obligations of the entity. For larger risk exposure, a company (corporation) may be formed to serve as the general partner. A corporate general partner is protected from direct attack by a judgment creditor because the ultimate liability for the debts and obligations rests with the shareholders. By spreading share ownership, individual exposure is considerably reduced. Even without a corporate general partner, risk can be spread by distribution of limited partnership shares. If a judgment creditor obtains a charging order against one partner, the order goes to that partner's share in distributions from the partnership, and not to the entire business.

=== Limited liability partnerships ===
The Limited Liability Partnerships Act 2000 (c. 12) came into effect 6 April 2001, making limited liability partnerships (LLPs) available to two or more persons wishing to enter business. The legislation has been formed by cross referencing, meaning that there is no sight statute which contains the legislation applicable to LLPs; this means that there are several hundred sections applicable to LLPs.

The Company Directors Disqualification Act 1986 (c. 46) is applied to the LLPs, making it so that a disqualified director is unable to join LLPs and so members of may also face the same proceedings as directors.

The key features of limit liability partnerships are:

- They are a corporate body, which means they are separate from the members.
- LLPs can own property, employ people, enter into contractual obligations and the LLP occurs the debts.
- An LLP has unlimited capacity which means that it is able to trade outside of its usual categories; companies have to trade within its Memorandum of Association.
- An LLP does not have directors and share holders but it does have members.
- It is not governed by the rules for maintenance of capital which companies are.
- They have limited liability which means the LLP is liable for its debts for the full extent of its assets.
- LLP's are do not have a Memorandum or Articles of Association. It has structural flexibility it has no requirements for the board or general meetings or decision making by resolution.
- LLP is required to maintain account records and is to prepare and deliver audited annual accounts to the register of companies; it will submit an annual return in a similar way to companies.
- LLP's and those that are members of groups can receive an exemption from auditing if it has a turnover if the turnover is less than £350,000 and a balance sheet total of less than £1.4 million.

It is essential for a limited liability partnership to have at least two designated members; these are selected by the agreement of the other members the rights and responsibilities are drawn upon the limited liability partnership agreement.

Their duties are as follows:

- Appointing an auditor (if one is needed).
- Signing the accounts on behalf of the members.
- Delivering the accounts to the Registrar.
- Notifying the Registrar of any membership changes or change to the registered office address or name of the limited liability partnership.
- Preparing, signing and delivering to the registrar an annual return (Form LLP363a) and acting on behalf of the limited liability partnership if it is wound up and dissolved.
- Designated members are also accountable in law for failing to carry out these legal responsibilities.

All members not just designated members are agents of the LLP they do have responsibilities to which have yet to be developed by the courts. Typical obligations its to act in the interests of the LLP, avoid conflicts of interest and prohibition on the making of secret profits.

A limited liability partnership has not got the same structure which is usually required be a company which has in statute provision for the structure of directors or board structure of management. It is for the members to create an LLP Agreement which is a separate document which is not to be given to Companies House it is to be held by the members themselves.

The main reasons for having an LLP agreement is that the default provisions in the absence of the agreement allows for all members of the LLP is that every member is to take part in the managements of the organisation, members are entitled to share profits equally. There is no member which is entitled to remuneration for acting in the business or management of the LLP.

The default provisions are limited in many issues such as in the nature and extent of capital contributions made by members and how disputes can be resolved. Within the LLP agreement it is highly recommended that there should be an alternative dispute resolution (ADR) clause which allows for organisations to opt for attribution or mediation to allow them to settle disputes without the need to go to court; court cases can often take a long time and are much more expensive than attributions where cases are often settled within 2–3 days and are of much less expensive. When this clause is in place then if a party goes to court then the case will be thrown out; attribution allows for legal bodies to settle their differences in private and it has many more benefits.

The LLP agreement should cover subjects such as:

- Management of the LLP
- The decision making process
- The capital contributions required of the members, both as an ongoing concern and liquidation.
- The division of profits
- Changes to the membership
- Dispute resolution
- Termination of the LLP
- Provisions for the amendment of the agreement

Members of LLP are subject to the statute and under the LLP agreement or in the absence of any agreement under the default provisions contained in the regulations.. Designated members have extra responsibility and have the responsibility to act within the statutory obligations.

The advantages of being an LLP include:

- Partners have greater protection from the risk of competitors demanding money.
- It is easier to attract and obtain talented members because the gain a share in the profits and get to limited liability.
- Registration with Companies House allows the business to be more open; allowing persons to view its account details.
- Unlike companies LLP's have tax advantages profits are shared among members and it is taxed as income tax, LLP's do not need to pay corporation tax.
- It is possible for an LLP to be a member of another LLP or a company to be a part of an LLP if so then these organisations will have to pay corporation tax on the profits which they make from the LLP.
- An LLP has internal flexibility having a total control of the organisation.

The drawbacks include:

- Lack of privacy—financial information has to be disclosed however there are some exemptions available.
- Requirement for the agreement which prevents the default provisions applying
- Legal uncertainty due to its age.
- When transferring into an LLP, organisations must inform customers, suppliers, banks and landlords etc. of the transfer to enable them to decide whether or not if they would like to continue with deciding it they would like to continue transactions with the organisation, if they do not the LLP will be in breach of the law.
- Individual persons or all the partners may be asked to give a personal guarantee's for the LLP.
- non-profit making organisations are disqualified to take-on this structure.

== Sole traders and partnership NIC and Income Tax ==
When starting up the business you will need to register as self-employed with HM Revenue & Customs and fill in form CW1- “Becoming self-employed and registering for National Insurance contributions and/or tax”. This form also enables registry as a sole-trader or a partnership; also you are able to inform them of your intentions of gaining employees ensuring that you pay their contributions. If this is not registered within three month then he is at risk of occurring a fine.

National Insurance Contributions are paid at fixed rate of £2.10pw- Class 2 NIC; in the 2006/2007 period however if you earn less than £5,035 you are able to get small earnings exemption. If the sole-trader reaches the threshold of £33,540 then he will have to pay Class 4 NIC this tax band is charged on a percentage.

Also sole traders must also pay Income Tax they do this by filling in the self-assessment form which also allows the Inland Revenue to calculate Class 4 NIC; this is simple to fill the information needed is usually costs, sales and profits; if turnover is above £15,000 you may have to keep a detailed profit and loss and balance sheet.

Basic records will normally include:

- A record of all your sales, with copies of any invoices you have issued
- A record of all your business purchases and expenses
- Invoices for all your business purchases and expenses
- Details of any amounts you personally pay into or take from the business
- Copies of business bank statements

Sole traders and partnerships have to pay tax even if they do not take money out of the organisation. This can be overcome by becoming a limited company however the paperwork is more extensive; limited companies are able to do this because corporation tax rates are much lower than income tax rates.

Business which make more than £60,000 have to register for a VAT number they also need to charge their customers VAT, you also need to fill in the relevant VAT returns and send VAT payments to HM Revenue & Customs. VAT is paid on its purchases this is called input tax they also charge tax on sales this is called output tax; if a business gains more output tax from what it pays in input then it must pay the difference, if the business receives more input than output then HMRC will pay the difference. Generally the VAT is charged at 17.5% however many products and services may receive lower VAT or may be except.

== Companies ==
There are four main types of companies which are as follows:

- Private company limited by shares – members liability is only limited by the amount unpaid on shares they hold. This includes community interest companies (CICs) which are private companies limited by shares.
- Private company limited by guarantee – members' liability is limited by the amount they have agreed to contribute to the company's assets if it is wound up. This includes all RTM (right-to-manage) companies, commonhold associations and those community interest companies which are companies limited by guarantee.
- Private unlimited company there is no limit to members' liability.
- Public limited companies (PLC) – the company's shares may be offered for sale to the general public and the members liability is only limited to the amount unpaid on shares held by them. This also includes community interest public limited companies

All companies are formed in close to the same way they register with Companies House. The document companies take with registering with Companies house are the memorandum of association and the articles of association. The memorandum of association sets out the company's name, where it is registered (England and Wales, or Scotland), it sets out the companies objectives and it contains the information on the share capital.

The articles of association contain information on the internal structure of the organisation it covers information such as rules for internal structure and management; that articles deal with items such as meeting procedures, powers of the directors, members' rights, procedures for paying dividends and winding up. These articles are quite long compared to memorandum of association, however the Companies Act 1985 has mechanisms to reduce the preparation of the articles of association. The articles are to be signed by the persons described on the memorandum.

The articles are subordinate to the memorandum which is defines the powers of the company. The purpose of the articles is to outline the duties, rights and powers of the governing body of the business the memorandum and the articles of association may be read together to supplement it and to further description of matter.

The memorandum of association and the articles of association are the constitution for the company, they are approved by licensing as they act as an artificial person so there is no single person to take responsibility and they must operate within the capacity which is set. The corporation's capacity is set within clause 3 of the memorandum of association (the objectives).

If a company acts outside its objectives, it considered that the act is ultra vires – "beyond its powers" and therefore void. The Companies Act 1989 relaxed this rule allowing for the companies to state "The company is to carry on business as a general commercial capacity". This statement allows the company "to trade or carry on business with whatsoever and; the company has the power to do all such things as are incidental or conducive to the carrying on of any trade or business by it".

There are also statutory forms which are to filled in and to be returned; Form 10 which is the Statement of the First Directors, Secretary and Registered Office; on the form you must inform Companies House of the company's registered office and the names and addresses of its directors names and addresses its directors and of the secretary, Form 10cs may be needed a Form 10 only has room for 10 directors. Form 12, Declaration of Compliance with the Requirements of the Companies Act, this states that the company has met the legal requirements of incorporation.

Organisations are given a company number which is unique. It lasts the whole life of the company, and is used to identify the company.

Organisations will have to find out how much the company is worth before find the value for shares (nominal value) this is done by finding how well the business as done in the past and how well it is expected to do in the future; this is rather complicated and it is recommended that it to be done by a merchant bank.

Shareholders with the largest share have the most control over the business; if it is 50% they with have total control of the business, when shareholders have 5% the will have the right to participate at the AGM. Shareholders control of the business is that they are able to vote out directors when they find issue with the way which directors run the organisation this may be because of ethical issues and issues of directors taking large salaries while the company is doing unsuccessfully

There is also the directors of the company their duty is to the company and to the shareholders they make the decisions for the business driving the business forward, shareholders elect the directors of the company and secretary.

== Private limited companies (limited by shares) / (limited by guarantee) ==
Private limited companies are one of the most common type of company. They have limited liability which refers to the liability of the shareholders who own the company, as they are the members of the company. They are only liable to the amount which they owe on the purchased shares. These companies are often run by families because they are not able to advertise the sale of its shares to the general public and all the shareholders must agree to the sale, which can cause problems when dealing with unknown persons. There is allowed to be no-more than 50 members of private companies limited by shares.

== Sources ==
- Needham, D.Dransfield, R.AVCE, Business. Heinemann.2000
- Bond, H.Kay, P.BusinessLaw. BlackstonePress.1995
- https://web.archive.org/web/20061117073927/http://www.ukcorporator.co.uk/memorandum_articles_association.php
- https://web.archive.org/web/20061117125442/http://www.bgateway.com/bg-home/bg-start-up/bg-launch-time/bg-register-a-limited-company.htm
- https://web.archive.org/web/20061210005859/http://www.presentationhelper.co.uk/business/register_a_limited_company.htm
- https://web.archive.org/web/20060905024351/http://www.businesslink.gov.uk/
- http://www.hmrc.gov.uk/rates/nic.htm
- https://web.archive.org/web/20061207063227/http://www.companieshouse.gov.uk/about/busRegArchive/RegIssue56.pdf
- https://web.archive.org/web/20061211110134/http://www.opsi.gov.uk/acts/acts2000/00012--a.htm#1
- https://www.coddan.co.uk/contact-us/business-service-levels/
- https://web.archive.org/web/20061130134729/http://www.tax.uk.com/Valueaddedtax.html
- https://web.archive.org/web/20070928222333/http://www.mycompanieshouse.gov.uk/about/gbhtml/gb02.shtml
- http://www.hmrc.gov.uk/guidance/cwg2.pdf
