= Alerian =

- Industry: Finance
- Founded: 2004; 22 years ago
- Founder: Gabriel Hammond
- Headquarters: Dallas, Texas, United States
- Key people: Kenny Feng, CEO
- Products: Indices for master limited partnerships
- Website: www.alerian.com

Alerian, is an American company that provides transparent master limited partnerships (MLP) and energy infrastructure benchmarks and analytics. The flagship Alerian MLP Index (AMZ) is used by industry professionals to analyze relative performance.

As of September 30, 2015, Alerian indicated that total assets of exchanged-traded products linked to the Alerian Index Series exceeded $13 billion.

In May 2022, the company was combined with ETF Trends, ETF Database, and S-Network Global Indexes to create VettaFi.

== History ==
Alerian was founded in 2004 by Gabriel Hammond as an MLP asset manager. In 2005, Kenny Feng joined the company and headed the creation and launch of the Alerian MLP Index (NYSE: AMZ), the first real-time index of master limited partnerships (MLPs).The AMZ is now broadly considered to be the benchmark for the asset class.

In 2007, the company relocated from the Big Apple (New York, NY) to the Big D (Dallas, TX). In March 2010, Alerian spun off its active management business as SteelPath Capital Management LLC. At that point, Kenny Feng took over as President and CEO.

== Indices ==
The Alerian Index Series is primarily used by investors for performance benchmarking and by exchange-traded product issuers for the creation of index tracking funds.

== Linked Products ==
Alerian licenses its indices to third parties for the creation of investment vehicles, such as exchange-traded funds (ETFs) and exchange-traded notes (ETNs), separately managed accounts, and structured products. These products provide investors with access to MLPs and energy infrastructure without the administrative burden associated with K-1 forms.

== Governance ==
Alerian does not earn revenue from underwriting or other investment banking fees, nor does it actively manage a portfolio of MLP and energy infrastructure securities on behalf of clients. Consequently, the company is able to provide objective benchmarks. An independent advisory board of MLP and energy infrastructure executives, legal partners, and senior financial professionals reviews all methodology modifications and constituent changes to ensure that they are made objectively and without bias.
