= Piatti Ristorante =

Restaurant chain in the United States

Piatti Ristorante, also known as Piatti, is a small restaurant chain located along the West Coast and in Texas. It is known for offering a range of authentic Italian cuisine and wines. For the last 33 years Piatti has catered their dining experience to both small groups and large private events.

Piatti is owned by Palisades Hospitality Group.

== Location ==
The first Piatti was established in La Jolla, California in 1990. Soon after, 6 additional restaurants were opened. As of 2013 there are now restaurants in Sacramento, Danville, Mill Valley and, Seattle Washington and two Piattis in San Antonino Texas. Each restaurant features the same classic dishes, but the decor and menu is customized to each location in order to include both local and Italian elements. Managers and chefs are given the freedom to change/ the Piatti restaurant spaces and menus based on the city where they are established. In a 2015 interview done by the San Francisco Business Times, while talking about the designs of the restaurants, Tim Harmon argued that "people want to feel like the restaurant they're going to is unique to the area and special and I think that's only continuing to grow ... being able to deliver that is critical to ongoing success."

Location	Address
La Jolla, California	2182 Avenida De La Playa La Jolla, CA 92037
Sacramento, California	571 Pavilions Lane Sacramento, CA 95825
Danville, California	100 Sycamore Valley Road West Danville, CA 94526
Mill Valley, California	625 Redwood Highway Mill Valley, CA 94941
Seattle, Washington	2695 NE Village Lane Seattle, WA 98105
San Antonino | Éilan, Texas	17803 La Cantera Terrace San Antonio, TX 78256
San Antonino | The Quarry, Texas	255 E. Basse Road, Suite 500 San Antonio, TX 78209

== History ==
The word Piatti is plural for the word "piatto," the Italian word for plates/platters. With European inspiration in mind, the Piatti brand name was established in 1987. The first restaurant's grand opening occurred in December 1990 in La Jolla, California. The owner is Tim Harmon, president of General Partnership. Piatti has since expanded beyond La Jolla to several other locations.

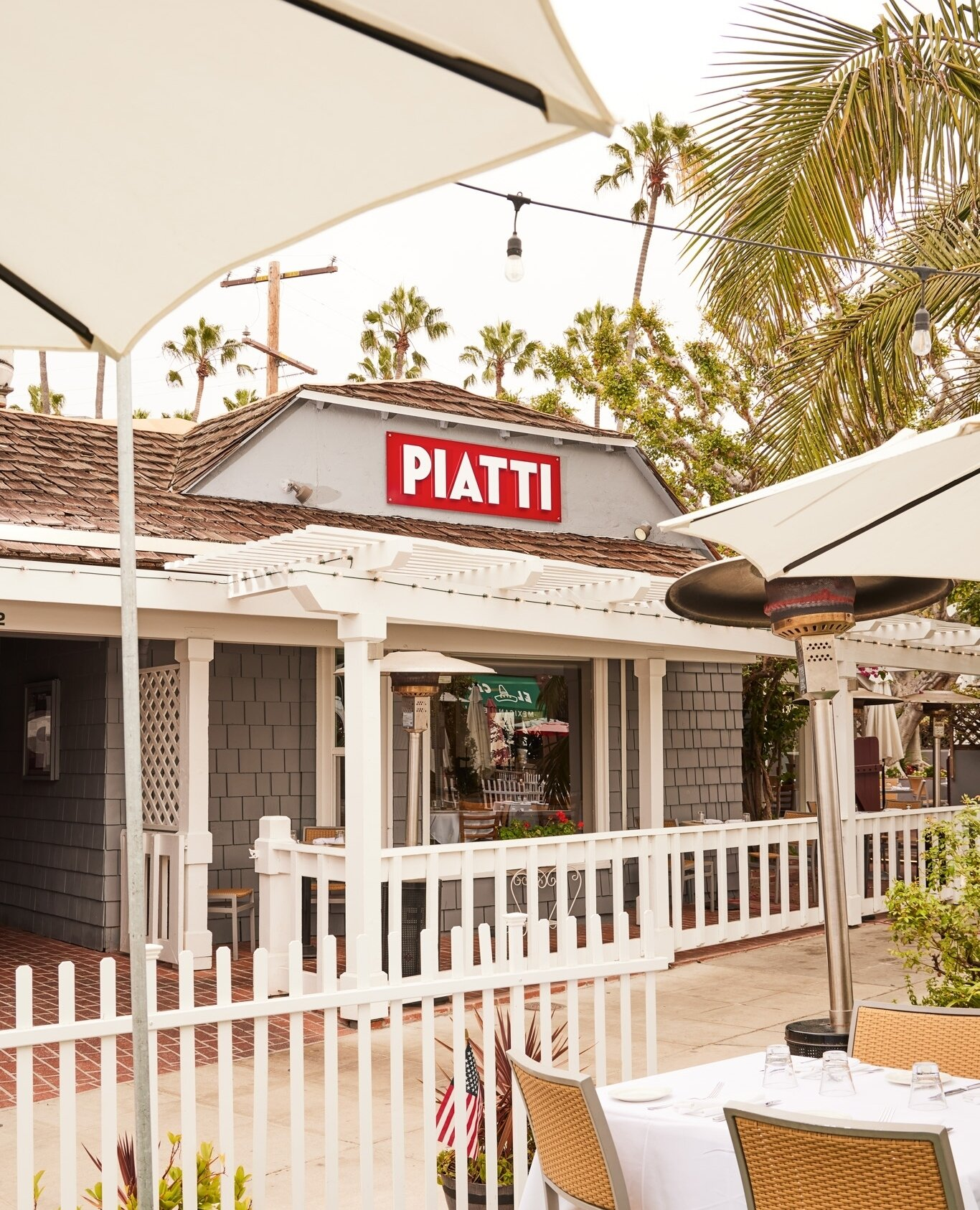
The 1st established Piatti in La Jolla, California.

Starting in 2021, with the Mill Valley location, Tim Harmon decided it was time for a change. According to Janelle Bitker of the San Francisco Chronicle, the refresh has been in the works for several years. It is being referred to as the “pandemic pivot,” and it is expected to affect all locations eventually.

== Menu ==
Piatti's menu features a variety of Italian-inspired dishes crafted using regionally sourced ingredients and prepared fresh daily. The drink menu includes cocktails, draft beers, and non-alcoholic options, along with a wine list sourced from local and international Italian wineries, which is catered to each location.
