= Jon S. Fossel =

American politician (born 1942)

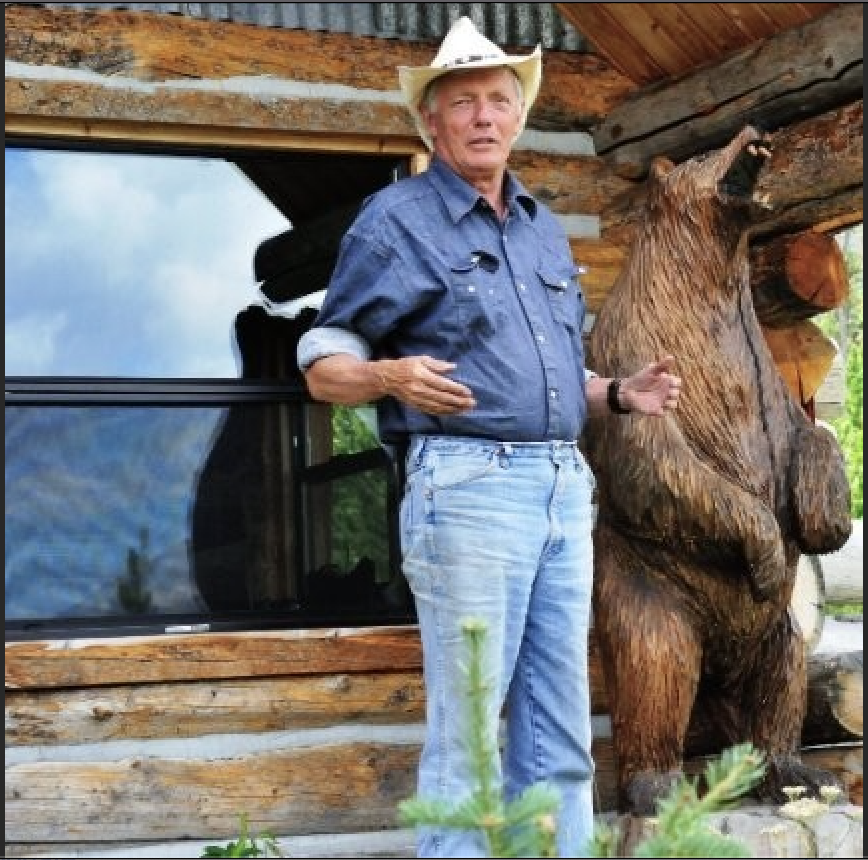
- Jon S. Fossel

Member of the New York State Assembly from the 93rd district
- In office January 1, 1979 – December 31, 1982
- Preceded by: Mary B. Goodhue
- Succeeded by: Eugene Levy

Personal details
- Born: February 7, 1942 (age 84) New York City, New York, U.S.
- Party: Republican
- Children: 2
- Education: Tufts University (BA)

Jon S. Fossel, (born February 7, 1942 - July 8, 2026), is an American former politician. He served in the New York State Assembly representing the 93rd district from 1979 to 1982 and was a candidate for Congress in 1982. Fossel's investment career included positions at CitiBank and serving as chairman and CEO of Oppenheimer Funds. He later co-founded the Jack Creek Preserve Foundation, an organization supporting wildlife conservation and education, as well as ethical hunting and land preservation initiatives.

== Early life ==
Jon S. Fossel was born on February 7, 1942, one of five brothers. He grew up in New York and completed his high school education at Fox Lane High School in Mount Kisco, New York. Fossel initially pursued a pre-med track when he started his higher education at Tufts University. However, his interests shifted, leading him to major in economics, graduating in 1964.

== Political career ==
Jon S. Fossel's political career was marked by his tenure as a Republican member of the New York State Assembly, representing the 93rd district from 1979 to 1982.

His committee memberships included the Ways and Means Committee, focusing on budgetary and financial matters, the Government Operations Committee, and the Urban Development Committee. In addition to his committee work, Fossel was also co-chairman of the freshman caucus with George Winner.

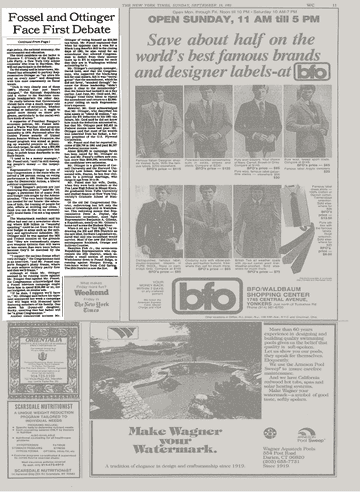
Fossel-Ottinger Debate News Clipping

Beyond his state legislative responsibilities, Fossel was involved in the Investment Company Institute. He held multiple positions within the institute, including serving on the executive committee and the Board of Governors.

Fossel was a candidate for New York's 20th Congressional District in the 1982 election. This campaign was a significant event not only for Fossel but also for the Republican Party, as highlighted in a New York Times article describing the race between Fossel and Richard Ottinger as a "major test" for the GOP. Fossel was defeated by Ottinger.

== Investment career ==
Fossel was a senior vice president at Citibank in the 1970s.

Fossel joined Alliance Capital Management around 1983, where he held the position of President of the mutual fund business.

Fossel joined OppenheimerFunds as president and Chief Operating Officer in 1987, and by 1989, he had risen to the position of chairman and CEO.

In 1995, Fossel resigned from OppenheimerFunds to pursue other interests, including a potential foray into politics and public service.

After retiring from Oppenheimer, Fossel became chairman of the board for Unum and NorthWestern Energy.

Fossel's approach to investment, particularly in mutual funds, was characterized by a willingness to take contrarian positions. He believed in the strategy of going against the market trends, which he saw as a path to better returns. This approach was exemplified by his practice of moving his individual retirement account into the two OppenheimerFunds that had performed the worst in the previous year, a strategy that he claimed consistently outperformed the average of their funds.

== Conservation ==
Fossel has made contributions to wildlife conservation and education, particularly through the Jack Creek Preserve Foundation, which he co-founded with his then wife, Dottie Fossel. The Foundation, established in 2005, focuses on preserving wildlife and its habitat by educating youth about the importance of conservation. It manages a 4,500-acre preserve that acts as a migratory corridor between sections of the Lee Metcalf Wilderness, contributing to biodiversity and habitat maintenance.

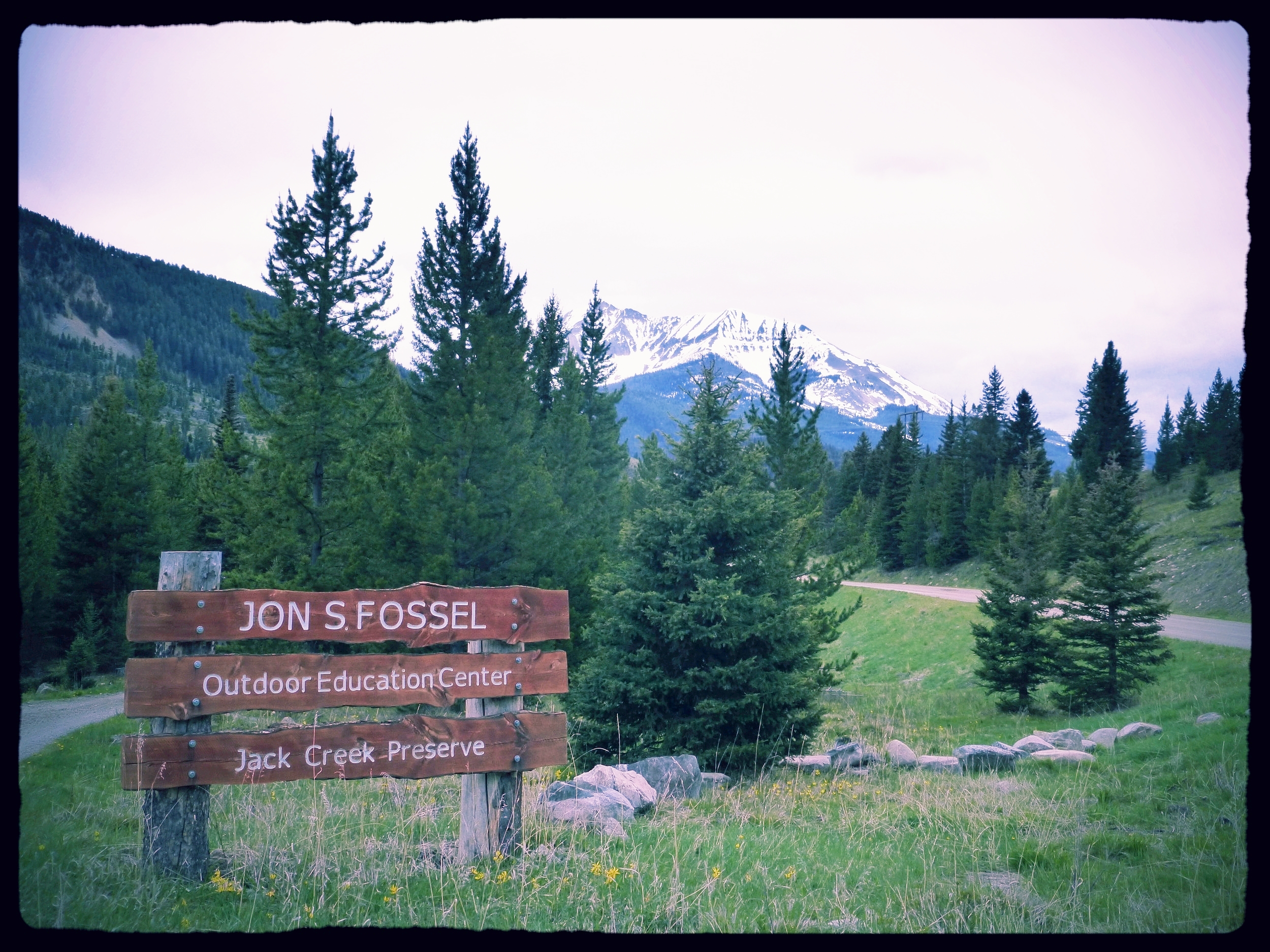
Jon S Fossel Outdoor Education Center

The Foundation's activities include hosting educational trips for students and outdoor camps that cover a range of activities, such as campfire building, archery, photography, astronomy, and fly fishing. The Foundation offers scholarships for students pursuing environmental and conservation-oriented studies.

Fossel promotes conservation easements on his land. He has donated hunts to organizations, helping to raise funds for conservation efforts.

Fossel was on the Board of Directors of the Rocky Mountain Elk Foundation from 1998 to 2003. The Foundation's mission is to ensure the future of elk, other wildlife, their habitat, and hunting heritage.

== Hunting and fishing ==
Fossel is an avid bow hunter, who has hunted every Big 5 in Africa. In addition to visiting Africa 28 times, Fossel has hunted 16 different species in North America, including over 100 deer.

Fossel also fishes.

== Personal life ==
Fossel married Dorothy Mead in 1964, and the couple have two children.

In 2010, Fossel married Siri Campbell.
