= JunHe =

JunHe 君合律师事务所
- Headquarters: Beijing, China
- No. of offices: 11
- No. of attorneys: 700+
- Major practice areas: General
- Date founded: 15 April 1989
- Company type: Partnership
- Website: www.junhe.com

Old logo

JunHe LLP (simplified Chinese: 君合律师事务所; traditional Chinese: 君合律師事務所; pinyin: Jūnhé Lǜshī Shīwùsuǒ), formerly Jun He Law Offices, is a corporate law firm headquartered in Beijing, China. JunHe is one of the first private Chinese law firms.

As of 2022, JunHe has eleven offices: in Beijing (head office), Shanghai, Shenzhen, Guangzhou, Dalian, Haikou, Chengdu, Qingdao, Hangzhou, Hong Kong, New York, and Cupertino. The firm's working languages are Chinese, English, Korean, and Japanese.

JunHe is a member of Multilaw and Lex Mundi.

== Rankings ==
JunHe was recommended by the 2010 edition of the IFLR1000, a guide to the world's leading financial law firms, in the following areas:

Practice area	Ranking position
Capital markets – local firms	Tier 1
Banking and project finance – local firms	Tier 1
Mergers and acquisitions – local firms	Tier 1

In July 2024, JunHe was honored with multiple accolades at the China Business Law Awards 2024, presented by Law.asia. The firm received awards across various categories, including Golden League, Legaltech Pioneers, Banking and Finance, Capital Markets (Domestic), Capital Markets (Hong Kong & Overseas), Data Protection and Privacy, ESG, Mergers & Acquisitions (Inbound & Domestic), Mergers & Acquisitions (Outbound), Restructuring & Insolvency, and sector-specific categories such as Automotive, Industrials and Manufacturing, Aviation, Construction and Infrastructure, Consumer and Retail, Energy and Natural Resources, Healthcare, and Pharma and Life Sciences.

== Clients ==
The firm's major clients as of 2008 include(d) Citigroup, UBS, JPMorgan Chase, Deutsche Bank, Morgan Stanley, Ferrero, Motorola, Nokia, IKEA, BHP, Walmart, Nissan, Northwest Airlines, and ExxonMobil, as well as a number of local Chinese companies.

== See also ==
- Legal history of China
- Chinese law
