= S-Network Global Indexes =

S-Network Global Indexes, Inc. was an American company that published and developed proprietary and custom stock market indexes. In 2022 it was acquired and merged with Alerian to form a new company VetttaFi. Founded in 1997, S-Network specialized in smart beta and thematic indexes that served as the basis for ETFs until its products we merged under VettaFi.

== History ==
Starting in 2006, S-Network began publishing specialty indexes covering sub-sectors and investment themes including the Alternative Energy, Automotive, Nuclear Energy, Space Poliwogg Medical Breakthroughs, Gaming, Maritime, Infrastructure, Hard Assets and Emerging Markets sectors.

In 2014, Thomson Reuters partnered with S-Network to develop a new family of environmental, social and corporate governance indices. On July 20, 2017, the index family was rebranded the Thomson Reuters/S-Network ESG Best Practices Ratings & Indices, reflecting changes to the methodology.

S-Network indexes were licensed to a number of financial intermediaries in the US and Europe and served as the basis for ETFs, Structured Products, mutual funds and UITs. S-Network indexes are also used for benchmarking and passive asset management purposes.

In May 19, 2022 S-Networks Global Indexes was combined with ETF Trends, ETF Database, and Alerian to create VettaFi.
