= Partnership taxation =

Partnership taxation is the concept of taxing a partnership business entity. Many jurisdictions regulate partnerships and their taxation differently.

== Common law ==
Many common law jurisdictions apply a concept called "flow through taxation" to partnerships. Partnerships are a flow-through entity where the taxes are assessed at the entity level but are applied to the partners of the partnership.

=== United States ===
Partnership taxation is codified as Subchapter K of Chapter 1 of the U.S. Internal Revenue Code (Title 26 of the United States Code). Partnerships are "flow-through" entities for United States federal income taxation purposes. Flow-through taxation means that the entity does not pay taxes on its income. Instead, the owners of the entity pay tax on their "distributive share" of the entity's taxable income, even if no funds are distributed by the partnership to the owners. Federal tax law permits the owners of the entity to agree how the income of the entity will be allocated among them, but requires that this allocation reflect the economic reality of their business arrangement, as tested under complicated rules.

=== United Kingdom ===
In general, a partnership is treated under Section 111 Income and Corporation Taxes Act 1988 and Section 848 Income Tax (Trading and Other Income) Act 2005 as not having a 'separate and distinct' legal personality from its members. As a result, partners are assessed to either UK corporation tax or UK income tax on their share of the profits and losses of the partnership

Following the case of Memec plc v CIR [70 TC 77], HM Revenue and Customs has issued guidance as to how interests of UK tax residents in foreign partnerships should be treated for UK tax purposes.

=== Hong Kong ===
Partnership taxation in Hong Kong is the taxation of the profits or losses generated by partnership business entities. First, these profits or losses of the partnership are assessed according to the Hong Kong Inland Revenue Ordinance, Chapter 112, section 22. After assessment, then said profits or losses flow through the partnership to the partners who are then taxed on their share of said profits or losses generated by the partnership without any taxes levied against the partnership.

== Civil law ==
Many civil law jurisdictions directly tax the partnership entity.

== See also ==
- Partnership
- Partnership accounting
