= Partnership (China) =

A partnership in the People's Republic of China is a business entity governed by the Partnership Enterprise Law passed by the Standing Committee of the National People's Congress to authorize and govern partnership enterprises. A partnership is a type of business entity in which partners share with each other the profits or losses of the business undertaking in which all have invested.

== History ==
From 1368 to 1911, partnerships with distributive shares were the principal form of a business entity that investors ran coal mines.

In the modern era, most enterprises were partnerships in the form of general partnerships levying unlimited liability on the partners. In 1933, 41% of factories were run by partnerships and 20% were sole proprietorships. After the end of the 1950s centralization of the economy caused the partnership form to vanish for nearly 30 years. In the 1980s partnerships returned with different names to avoid the sensitive label of private ownership.

On 1 June 2007, the Partnership Enterprise Law came into force and established partnerships as a legal business entity.

== Partnership enterprise ==
The term partnership enterprise refers to general partnerships and limited partnerships which may be established within China by natural persons, legal persons and other organizations. A state-funded company, state-owned company, listed company, public welfare-oriented public institution or social organization may not become a general partner of a limited partnership.

=== General partnership ===
A general partnership (Chinese: 普通合伙) may be formed by general partners, who bear unlimited joint and several liability for the debts of the partnership.

=== Limited partnership ===
A limited partnership (Chinese: 有限合伙) is formed by a combination of general partners and limited partners, where the limited partners bear the liabilities for the partnership's debts to the extent of their capital contributions.

=== Special general partnership ===
A special general partnership (Chinese: 特殊普通合伙) resembles a general partnership except that it must be a professional service institution offering services requiring professional knowledge and special skills. The structure shields co-partners from unlimited liabilities due to the willful misconduct or gross negligence of one partner or a group of partners. It is intended as the preferred form of organization for law and accounting firms.

== Establishment ==
A partnership requires a written agreement between the partners. This written agreement must be submitted to the business registration government body along with the identity of the partners.

A partnership must abide by the following requirements:

- Have 2 or more partners
- Have a written partnership agreement;
- Have capital contributions subscribed to or actually paid by the partners;
- Have a name and a place of business for the partnership enterprise; and
- Abide by any other conditions as provided for the law;

Should it be a general partnership or limited partnership then that shall be in its name.

A limited partnership may not have less than 2 partners where one of them is a general partner nor may it have more than fifty partners.

== Liabilities ==
A partnership must pay all its debts with property contributed to the partnership by the partners.

If the partnership is a general partnership then the partners bear joint and several liability.

A limited partner may not conclude partnership operations nor may such a partner represent the partnership to 3rd parties.

== Capital contributions ==
A partner may contribute capital to the partnership to garner a share of the partnership's profits or losses. A capital contribution may include money, intellectual property right, land use right or other properties, or labor services at a valuation determined by agreement among the partners.

If the partnership is a limited partnership, then the limited partners may not make capital contributions with labor services.

== Distributions ==
The default distribution scheme of profits or losses follows the proportion to capital contributions made by the partners. However, the distribution scheme may follow an informal negotiated agreement or abide by scheme adopted in the partnership agreement. If the proportions of capital contributions cannot be discerned, then the profits or losses will be distributed equally by the partners.

The partnership agreement may not distribute all losses or all profits to just one or a group of partners within the partnership.

== Taxation ==
The partners shall pay tax on their respective share of the partnership income.

== Procedures ==
The required documents and procedures of partnership enterprise in China

== See also ==
- Partnership
- Partnership taxation
- Law of the People's Republic of China
