= OppenheimerFunds =

Global asset manager acquired by Invesco in 2019

OppenheimerFunds, Inc.
- Industry: Financial services
- Founded: 1959; 67 years ago
- Founder: Leon Levy
- Defunct: May 24, 2019; 6 years ago
- Fate: Acquired by Invesco
- Headquarters: New York, United States
- Key people: Martin Flanagan, CEO
- AUM: $260 billion (As of 28 February 2019)

OppenheimerFunds, Inc. was a global asset manager. As of February 28, 2019, the company managed over $260 billion in assets in over 13,000,000 investor accounts. In May 2019, the company was acquired by Invesco. OppenheimerFunds had 16 investment management teams that oversaw actively managed equity, fixed income, alternative, and multi-asset portfolios, and exchange-traded funds. Customers included financial advisors and wealth managers and their clients, as well as institutional investors, corporations, financial endowments, foundations, and sovereign wealth funds.

== History ==
=== 1959-2019 ===
The company was founded in 1959. In 1987, British and Commonwealth Holdings acquired Mercantile House and gained control of OppenheimerFunds. OppenheimerFunds was acquired by Massachusetts Mutual Life Insurance Company in 1990 for $150 million.

Bill Glavin was CEO of the company from 2009 to 2014. He also served as chair. Arthur Steinmetz became president in 2013, CEO in July 2014, and chairman in 2015, simultaneously serving in all three roles.

In July 2012, OppenheimerFunds acquired SteelPath, enabling clients to invest in master limited partnerships. The firm acquired RevenueShares in 2015 to expand its offerings into the smart beta space. In 2016 it launched a suite of smart beta exchange-traded funds, including environmental, social and corporate governance offerings.

In 2017, it acquired SNW Asset Management, expanding its fixed income offerings into high-quality municipal bonds and customized separately managed accounts. The firm opened its headquarters for Europe, the Middle East and Africa (EMEA) in London in October 2017. Also in October 2017, the firm formed a joint venture with The Carlyle Group to provide global private credit for high-net-worth individuals and advisors primarily focused on the U.S. market. In September 2018, OppenheimerFunds had $248 billion in funds under management. In October 2018, OppenheimerFunds was operating as a subsidiary of Massachusetts Mutual Life Insurance.

=== 2019-2024 ===
As of February 28, 2019, the company managed over $260 billion in assets in over 13,000,000 investor accounts. On May 24, 2019, Invesco acquired the company for about $5 billion. It was the largest fund management mergers and acquisitions deal since 2014, when TIAA-CREF purchased Nuveen for $6.3 billion. As part of the acquisition, OppenheimerFunds’ parent company MassMutual took 15.5% of Invesco. CEO Arthur Steinmetz was slated to leave after the Invesco purchase. Instead, Invesco CEO and president Martin Flanagan was announced as Steinmetz's successor. Steinmetz had left by June 2019. Also that month, Invesco appointed five trustees to its board who had previously been on OppenheimerFunds' older boards.

In March 2019, Invesco announced it was cutting 850 jobs at Oppenheimer's office in the Denver area. At the time, around 1000 people worked there. Invesco called the firings necessary to achieve its "$475 million dollar cost synergy target" it had set for itself after the acquisition. It was the most job cuts by a single employer in Colorado since 2015.

== Philanthropy ==
The firm's corporate philanthropy initiatives included its 10,000 Kids by 2020 program, which aimed to introduce 10,000 students to numeracy programs through nonprofit partnerships and active employee volunteerism. The firm worked with organizations including the National Museum of Mathematics, the Boys & Girls Clubs of America, and Cross-Cultural Solutions.

== Awards and recognition ==
OppenheimerFunds was named as the Best Place to Work in Money Management for 2017 by Pensions & Investments.

Fortune named the firm one of the 40 Best Workplaces in Financial Services and Insurance, and 25 Best Large Workplaces in New York.

In 2019, the company earned 19 Lipper Fund Awards in four asset classes.
