= Limited liability partnership =

Partnership in which some or all partners have limited liabilities

A limited liability partnership (LLP) is a partnership in which some or all of the partners have limited liability. An LLP is the partnership form of a limited liability company (LLC) and has aspects of both partnerships and corporations. In an LLP, each partner is not responsible or liable for another partner's misconduct or negligence. This distinguishes an LLP from a traditional partnership in which each partner has joint (but not several) liability. In an LLP, some or all partners have a form of limited liability similar to that of the shareholders of a corporation. Depending on the jurisdiction, however, the limited liability may extend only to the negligence or misconduct of the other partners, and the partners may be personally liable for other liabilities of the firm or partners.

Unlike corporate shareholders, the partners have the power to manage the business directly. In contrast, corporate shareholders must elect a board of directors under the laws of various state charters. The board organizes itself (also under the laws of the various state charters) and hires corporate officers who then have as "corporate" individuals the legal responsibility to manage the corporation in the corporation's best interest. An LLP also contains a different level of tax liability from that of a corporation.

The combination of the flexibility of the partnership structure with the protection from liability for the individual negligence or misconduct of other partners makes the structure attractive to professional-services firms with potentially large exposure to professional malpractice claims in the absence of limited liability. The form has thus historically been adopted most widely by law firms and accounting firms.

== Effect of limited liability ==
Limited liability partnerships, as well as all forms of limited liability companies, offer alternatives to traditional company and corporate structures. Limited liability can enable opportunities for new business growth that were formerly accessible only to those who had access to large amounts of capital or other resources.

Depending on jurisdiction and industry, there can be negative consequences for stakeholders associated with limited liability. For some large accountancy firms in the UK, reorganizing as LLPs and LLCs has relieved them of owing the "duty of care" to individuals and clients who are adversely affected by audit failures.

Accountancy firm partners share the profits, but don't have to suffer the consequences of negligence by firm or fellow partners. Not content with lobbying and financing political parties to get their way, accountancy firms have hired entire governments to advance their interests. PricewaterhouseCoopers and Ernst &Young hired the legislature of Jersey to enact an LLP Bill, which they themselves had drafted. They awarded themselves protection from lawsuits, with little public accountability... Accounting is central to all calculations about institutionalised abuses, tax and responsibility avoidance.

In the U.S., the Delaware Supreme Court Chief Justice Myron Steele suggested that limited liability entities should not be held to common law standards of fiduciary principles (as applied to all other company and corporate structures). Instead, he argued that courts should use contractual analysis of the partnership agreement when assessing cases of improper corporate governance. This directly led to elimination of the "independent fiduciary duty of good faith" in Delaware corporate law in 2006.

== Worldwide ==
When limited liability partnerships are authorized by law, in contrast with limited partnerships, the jurisdiction in which a LLP is formed may extend limited liability to all of its partners, while a limited partnership may require at least one unlimited partner and allow others to assume the role of a passive and limited liability investor.

In some jurisdictions, an LLP must have at least one person known as a "general partner", who has unlimited liability for the company.

There is considerable difference between LLPs as constituted in the U.S. and those introduced in the UK under the Limited Liability Partnerships Act 2000 and adopted elsewhere. The UK LLP is, despite its name, specifically legislated as a corporate body rather than as a partnership.

=== Australia ===
Partnerships are governed on a state-by-state basis in Australia. In Queensland, a limited liability partnership is composed of at least one general partner and one limited partner. It is thus similar to what is called a limited partnership in many countries.

=== Canada ===
All provinces and territories—except Yukon, Prince Edward Island, and Nunavut—permit LLPs for lawyers and accountants. In British Columbia, the Partnership Amendment Act, 2004 (Bill 35) permits LLPs for lawyers, accountants, and other professionals, as well as businesses.

=== China ===
In China, the LLP is known as a special general partnership (Chinese: 特殊普通合伙). The organizational form is restricted to knowledge-based professions and technical service industries. The structure shields co-partners from unlimited liabilities due to the willful misconduct or gross negligence of one partner or a group of partners.

=== France ===
There is no exact equivalent of a limited liability partnership in France. A limited partnership is equivalent to the French law vehicle known as a fr:Société en Commandite. A partnership company can be an equity partnership, known as a fr:Société en Participation (SEP), or a general partnership, known as a fr:Société en Nom Collectif (SNC).

=== Germany ===
The German Partnerschaftsgesellschaft or PartG is an association of non-commercial professionals, working together. Though not a corporate entity, it can sue and be sued, own property and act under the partnership's name. The partners, however, are jointly and severally liable for all the partnership's debts, except when only some partners' misconduct caused damages to another party — and then only if professional liability insurance is mandatory. Another exception, possible since 2012, is a Partnerschaftsgesellschaft mbB (mit beschränkter Berufshaftung) where all liabilities from professional misconduct are limited by the partnership's capital.

The Partnerschaftsgesellschaft is not subject to corporate or business tax, only its partners' respective income is taxed.

=== Greece ===
An LLP is an approximate equivalent to the Greek ΕΠΕ (Εταιρεία Περιορισμένης Ευθύνης, Etería Periorizménis Evthínis), meaning Company of Limited Liability. In an ΕΠΕ the partners own personal shares that can be sold by a partner only when all other partners agree. The business management can be exercised either directly by the board of partners or by a General Manager. In the aspect of liability, an ΕΠΕ is identical to an LLP.

=== India ===
The Limited Liability Partnership Act, 2008 was published in the official Gazette of India on 9 January 2009 and has been in effect since 31 March 2009. However, only limited sections of the Act have been ratified. Rules of the Act were published in the official Gazette on 1 April 2009 and amended in 2017. The first Indian limited liability partnership (LLP) was incorporated on 2 April 2009.

In India, as in many other jurisdictions, a limited liability partnership (LLP) is different from a limited partnership. An LLP operates like a limited partnership, but in an LLP, each member is protected from personal liability, except to the extent of their capital contribution to the LLP.

1. In India, for all purposes of taxation (service tax or any other stipulated tax payment), an LLP is treated like any other partnership firm.
2. Liability is limited to each partner's agreed upon contribution to the LLP.
3. No partner is liable on account of the independent or unauthorized actions of other partners, thus allowing individual partners to be shielded from joint liability created by another partner's wrongful business decisions or misconduct.
4. An LLP shall be a body corporate and a legal entity separate from its partners. It will have perpetual succession. The Indian Partnership Act, 1932 shall not be applicable to LLPs and there shall not be any upper limit on the number of partners in an LLP, unlike an ordinary partnership firm where the maximum number of partners can not exceed 20.
5. The Limited Liability Partnership Act has a mandatory requirement that one of the partners in the LLP must be an Indian.
6. Provisions have been made for corporate actions like mergers and acquisitions.
7. While enabling provisions in respect of winding up and dissolution of LLPs have been made, detailed provisions in this regard would be provided by way of rules under the Act.
8. The Registrar of Companies (RoC) shall register and control LLPs.

==== Characteristics ====
1. Separate legal entity: Like a company, an LLP is a separate legal entity from the people that constitute it. Thus, in law the partners and the LLP are distinct from each other. This is like a company where directors are different from the company.
2. No requirement of minimum capital: A minimum amount of capital is required to be contributed by the members or owners who want to form a company, but there is no minimum capital requirement to form an LLP.
3. Minimum number of members: To start a limited liability partnership, at least two members are required initially. However, there is no limit on the maximum number of partners.
4. No requirement of compulsory audit: All companies, whether private or public, irrespective of their share capital, are required to get have accounts audited by a practicing Chartered Accountant in India. But in the case of an LLP, there is no such mandatory requirement. A limited liability partnership is required to be audited only if:

- the contributions of the LLP exceed ₹ 25 lakhs or
- the annual turnover of the LLP exceeds ₹ 40 lakhs.

==== Benefits ====
1. It is more flexible to organize the internal structure of an LLP. Comparatively, it is complex to organize the internal structure of a company.
2. There is no maximum limit for the number of partners in an LLP. In a private limited company, there can be a maximum of 200 shareholders.
3. Raising and utilization of funds depends on the partners' will. Funds can be bought and utilized only as per the norms listed under the Companies Act, 2013.
4. LLPs are exempt from the Dividend Distribution Tax (DDT). In contrast, a company has to pay DDT on dividend distribution.
5. Professionals like chartered accountants, cost accountants (CMAs), advocates, engineers, and doctors may prefer to register a trade association as an LLP.

==== Disadvantages ====
1. Any act of one partner may bind the entire limited liability partnership even if no other partner is involved.
2. LLPs cannot raise money from the public.
3. Angel investors and venture capital firms generally prefer not to invest in LLPs, preferring private limited companies. However, LLPs are generally incorporated by entrepreneurs to save the compliance costs required of a private limited company. If a LLP must raise funds, it is able to convert to a private or public limited company. Angel investors and venture capital firms will then invest in the converted private limited company. The conversion of an LLP to a private limited company is not a very difficult thing, and to promote the ease of doing business, the government of India has made it easier for LLPs to convert into a private limited company in a complete online manner.

=== Ireland ===
Limited liability partnerships are permitted in Ireland under the Legal Services Regulation Act, 2015.

=== Japan ===
Limited liability partnerships (有限責任事業組合, yūgen sekinin jigyō kumiai) were introduced to Japan in 2006 during a large-scale revamp of the country's laws governing business organizations. Japanese LLPs may be formed for any purpose (although the purpose must be clearly stated in the partnership agreement and cannot be general), have full limited liability and are treated as pass-through entities for tax purposes. However, each partner in an LLP must take an active role in the business, so the model is more suitable for joint ventures and small businesses than for companies in which investors plan to take passive roles.

Japanese LLPs may not be used by lawyers or accountants, as these professions are required to do business through an unlimited liability entity.

A Japanese limited liability partnership is not a corporation, (i.e. a separate legal entity from partners within the meaning of Anglo-American law), but rather exists as a contractual relationship between the partners, similar to an American LLP. Japan also has a type of corporation with a partnership-styled internal structure, called a godo kaisha, which is closer in form to a British LLP or American limited liability company.

=== Kazakhstan ===
The concept of LLP exists in Kazakhstan law. All partners in a Kazakhstan LLP have limited liability, and they are liable for the debts of the partnership to the extent of the value of their corresponding participatory interests in the partnership. The names for an LLP in Kazakhstan are "ЖШС" (Жауапкершілігі шектеулі серіктестік Jauapkerşılıgı şekteulı serıktestık) in Kazakh and "ТОО" (Товарищество с ограниченной ответственностью Tovarishchestvo s ogranichennoy otvyetstvyennostʼyu) in Russian. This is the most popular business form in Kazakhstan. Almost any private business may be incorporated as an LLP, with the notable exceptions are banks, airlines, insurance companies, and mortgage companies, which must be incorporated in the form of a joint stock company.

An LLP in Kazakhstan is a corporate body, and in fact, is a limited liability corporation (LLC). Partners cannot conduct business on their own, and it is the corporate body that conducts the business.

There is also a concept of "simple partnership" in Kazakhstan law, which corresponds more closely to the general concept of partnership, but it is not widely used and is not well developed in Kazakhstan.

=== Kenya ===
In Kenya, limited liability partnerships have a legal personality distinct from its member partners. The liability of the partners is limited to any amount that may remain unpaid over the capital of the partnership. However, partners may be deemed liable for omissions or actions done by themselves if they lacked the relevant authority from the partnership or the affected party knew that such partner lacked authority or had no reason to believe that such person was a partner in the partnership. Registration is what vests such legal personality upon the entity. Registration is done by the registrar of companies after meeting. The requirements are set out in the Limited Liability Partnership Act 2011.

=== Nigeria ===
In Nigeria, limited liability partnerships (LLP) have legal personality. However, one must register a partnership first before it can gain the status of limited liability partnerships. Either way, the liability of the partners is limited.

=== Poland ===
A close equivalent to limited liability partnerships under Polish law is the spółka partnerska, where all partners are jointly and severally liable for the partnership's debts apart from those arising from another partner's misconduct or negligence. This partnership type is only permitted for representatives of some "high risk" occupations, such as lawyers, medicine doctors, tax advisers, accountants, brokers, sworn translators etc.

=== Romania ===
A limited liability partnership is equivalent to the Romanian law vehicle known as a Societate civilă profesională cu răspundere limitată.

=== Singapore ===
LLPs are formed under the Limited Liability Partnerships Act 2005. This legislation draws on both the US and UK models of the LLP, and like the latter establishes the limited liability partnership as a body corporate. However, for the purpose of tax transparency it is treated like a general partnership, so that the partners rather than the partnership are subject to tax.

=== United Kingdom ===
In the United Kingdom, LLPs are governed by the Limited Liability Partnerships Act 2000 (in Great Britain) and the Limited Liability Partnerships Act (Northern Ireland) 2002 in Northern Ireland, with the rules governing this scheme consolidated across the UK with the Companies Act 2006, the latter coming into effect in 2009. It was lobbied for by the Big Four auditing firms, all of which had converted by January 2003, limiting their liability for their audits. A UK limited liability partnership is a corporate body — that is to say, it has a continuing legal existence independent of its members, as compared to a partnership which may (in England and Wales, does not) have a legal existence dependent upon its membership.

A UK LLP's members have a collective ("joint") responsibility, to the extent that they may be part of an "LLP agreement", but no individual ("several") takes responsibility for each other's actions. As with a limited company or a corporation, members in an LLP cannot, in the absence of fraud or wrongful trading, lose more than they invest.

In relation to tax, however, a UK LLP is similar to a partnership; namely, it is tax-transparent, which is to say it pays no UK corporation tax or capital gains tax. Instead, LLP income and/or gains are distributed gross to partners as self-employed persons, rather than as PAYE employees. Partners receiving income and/or gains from an LLP are liable for their own taxation.

There is no requirement for the LLP agreement to be in writing because simple partnership-based regulations apply by way of default provisions. This model has been closely replicated by Japan, Dubai, and Qatar. It is perhaps closest in nature to a limited liability company in the United States of America, although it may be distinguished from that type of entity by the fact that the LLC, while having a legal existence independent of its members, is not technically a corporate body because its legal existence is time limited and therefore not "continuing".

The LLP structure is commonly used by accountants to retain the tax structure of traditional partnerships whilst adding some limited liability protection. LLPs are also becoming more common among legal firms, although they are permitted to use a limited company structure.

=== United States ===
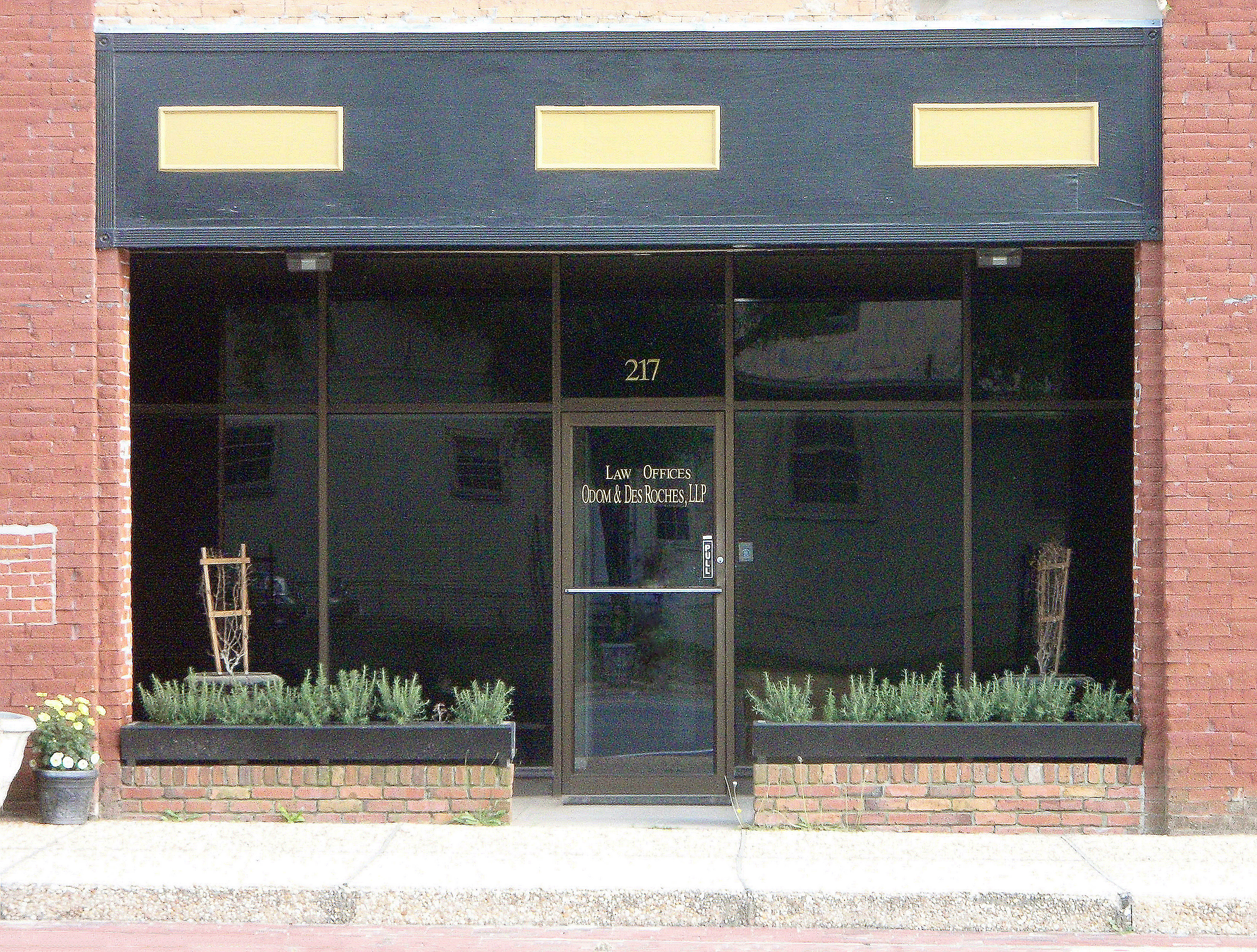
Example of an LLP office in the State of Georgia (U.S.)

In the United States, each individual state has its own law governing the formation of an LLP. Limited liability partnerships emerged in the early 1990s: while only two states allowed LLPs in 1992, over forty had adopted LLP statutes by the time LLPs were added to the Uniform Partnership Act in 1996.

The limited liability partnership was first formed in the aftermath of the collapse of real estate and energy prices in Texas in the 1980s. This collapse led to a large wave of bank and savings and loan failures. Because the amounts recoverable from the banks were small, efforts were made to recover assets from the lawyers and accountants that had advised the banks in the early 1980s. The reason was that partners in law and accounting firms were subject to the possibility of huge claims which would bankrupt them personally, and the first LLP laws were passed to shield innocent members of these partnerships from liability.

Although found in many business fields, the LLP is an especially popular form of organization among professionals, particularly lawyers, accountants, and architects. In some U.S. states, namely California, New York, Oregon, and Nevada, LLPs can only be formed for such professional uses. Formation of an LLP typically requires filing certificates with the county and state offices. Although specific rules vary from state to state, all states have passed variations of the Revised Uniform Partnership Act.

The liability of the partners varies from state to state. Section 306(c) of the Revised Uniform Partnership Act (1997) (RUPA), a standard statute adopted by a majority of the states, grants LLPs a form of limited liability similar to that of a corporation:

An obligation of a partnership incurred while the partnership is a limited liability partnership, whether arising in contract, tort, or otherwise, is solely the obligation of the partnership. A partner is not personally liable, directly or indirectly, by way of contribution or otherwise, for such an obligation solely by reason of being or so acting as a partner.

However, a sizable minority of states only extend such protection against negligence claims, meaning that partners in an LLP can be personally liable for contract and intentional tort claims brought against the LLP. While Tennessee and West Virginia have otherwise adopted RUPA, their respective adoptions of Section 306 depart from the uniform language, and only a partial liability shield is provided.

As in a partnership or limited liability company (LLC), the profits of a limited liability partnership are allocated among the partners for tax purposes, avoiding the problem of "double taxation" often found in corporations.

Some US states have combined the LP and LLP to create limited liability limited partnerships.

== See also ==
- Professional corporation
- Société à Responsibilité Limitée (SARL) for Francophone countries
