= Uniform Limited Partnership Act =

Proposed NCCUSL legislation

(ULPA is also an acronym for ultra-low penetration air (ULPA) filters.)

The Uniform Limited Partnership Act (ULPA), which includes its 1976 revision called the Revised Uniform Limited Partnership Act (RULPA), is a uniform act (similar to a model statute), proposed by the National Conference of Commissioners on Uniform State Laws ("NCCUSL") for the governance of business partnerships by U.S. States. The NCCUSL promulgated the original ULPA in 1916 and the most recent revision in 2001.

== Names of Prior Revisions ==
The NCCUSL promulgated the original ULPA in 1916, which is now called the Uniform Limited Partnership Act (1916) or ULPA (1916); a 1976 revision named the Revised Uniform Limited Partnership Act which is also now called the Uniform Limited Partnership Act (1976), ULPA (1976) or RULPA (1976); a 1985 revision named Uniform Limited Partnership Act (1976) with 1985 Amendments, which is also now called ULPA (1985) or RULPA (1985); and a 2001 revision that was colloquially called Re-RULPA during the drafting process but then was officially named the Uniform Limited Partnership Act (2001) or ULPA (2001). The acts may also be properly referred to without parentheses by placing the year after a hyphen, for example, ULPA-1916.

== See also ==
- Uniform Partnership Act
- List of Uniform Acts (United States)
- Partnership
