= Master limited partnership =

Limited partnership that is publicly traded on a securities exchange

In the United States, a master limited partnership (MLP) or publicly traded partnership (PTP) is a publicly traded entity taxed as a partnership. It combines the tax benefits of a partnership with the liquidity of publicly traded securities.

To obtain the tax benefits of a pass through, MLPs must generate at least 90% or more of their income from qualifying sources such as from production, processing, storage, and transportation of depletable natural resources and minerals. In addition, real property rents also qualify.

The "MLP" and "PTP" terms are commonly used interchangeably, but MLPs are technically a type of limited partnership that conducts its operations through subsidiaries and are not always publicly traded. Most PTPs are organized as MLPs, but a PTP may be organized as a limited liability company that elects to be taxed as a partnership.

== History ==
In 1981, Apache Corporation formed the United States' first MLP, Apache Petroleum Company (APC). Apache’s success drew other oil and gas companies to the MLP structure. Real estate companies soon followed, and by the mid-1980s, MLPs became so popular that they were adopted in a variety of industries, such as restaurants, hotels and cable TV. Even the Boston Celtics basketball team became an MLP.

Section 7704 of the Revenue Act of 1987 limited which businesses could be MLPs, delineating that an MLP must earn at least 90% of its gross income from qualifying sources, which were strictly defined as the transportation, processing, storage, and production of natural resources and minerals.

In the decades since, the Internal Revenue Service has issued Private Letter Rulings which further clarify and define which activities generate qualifying income and which do not.

== Structure ==
Like all limited partnerships, MLPs have two classes of ownership: the general partner(s) which make the decisions, and the limited partners which contribute funds and participate in the economics. The general partner owes no fiduciary duty to the limited partners; however, many MLPs have incentive distribution rights, which are designed to align the interests of all parties.

MLPs pay their investors through quarterly required distributions, the amount of which is stated in the partnership agreement, or contract, between the limited partners (the investors) and the general partner (the managers). The distribution paid by MLPs is equivalent to the dividend paid by C corporations. In the partnership agreement, the distribution is typically defined as all available cash flow, less a reserve which is determined by the general partner. Typically, the higher the quarterly distributions paid to limited partners, the higher the management fee paid to the general partner. This provides the general partner with an incentive to maximize distributions through pursuing income-producing acquisitions and organic growth projects.

In addition to the traditional governance committees, an MLP often has a conflicts committee composed of two or more independent directors. This committee reviews specific matters as authorized by the board of directors that may involve conflicts of interest.

== Taxation ==
Because MLPs are not subject to corporate taxation, they act as pass-through entities. Limited partners may also record a pro-rated share of the MLP's depreciation on their own tax forms to reduce liability. This means that all items on an MLP's income statement flow through to the investors who pay taxes on their individual portion at their individual income tax rates. As depreciation typically exceeds income, the majority of an investor’s distribution serves to reduce the cost basis of the investment, which reduces the taxes owed in the current year. Instead of a Form 1099, MLP investors receive a Schedule K-1 tax form.

As a consequence of their pass-through status, holding MLPs in tax-exempt accounts may generate Unrelated Business Income Tax (UBIT). To encourage tax-exempt investors, some MLPs set up C corporation holding companies of limited partner which can issue common equity.

== Types of MLPs ==
=== Energy ===
Because of the stringent provisions on MLPs and the nature of the quarterly required distributions, most MLPs operate oil, natural gas, or refined product pipeline businesses, which tend to generate more predictable income streams. However, many other assets can be operated in an MLP including processing plants, natural resource storage facilities, rail terminals, marine transportation vessels, and refineries, among others.

Examples of MLPs involved in the gathering, processing, compression, transportation and storage of oil and gas include Buckeye Partners, DCP Midstream, Energy Transfer Partners, Enterprise Products Partners, Magellan Midstream Partners, NuStar Energy, Plains All American Pipeline, TC PipeLines, and TransMontaigne Partners. A number of MLPs are dedicated to marine transportation, oil and gas exploration, oilfield services, and downstream refining/marketing/distribution services. MLPs also operate in the propane, coal and biomass industries.

=== Financial ===
A number of companies in the finance, investment and real estate industries operate as MLPs, such as AllianceBernstein, Apollo Global Management, The Blackstone Group, Brookfield Property Partners, The Carlyle Group, Icahn Enterprises, and Och-Ziff Capital Management.

=== Other ===
Under the rents from real property provision of the tax code, companies operating cemeteries qualify to become MLPs. Additionally, the first generation of MLPs was grandfathered into the structure in the 1980s when the incomes limits were strictly defined. While most have converted to other structures such as REITs or C corporations, a few, such as Brookfield Infrastructure Partners, still exist.

== See also ==
- Kommanditgesellschaft auf Aktien (KGaA), a similarly-designed business entity under German law.
