= Partnership accounting =

Type of accounting

When two or more individuals engage in enterprise as co-owners, the organization is known as a partnership. This form of organization is popular among personal service enterprises, as well as in the legal and public accounting professions. The important features of and accounting procedures for partnerships are discussed and illustrated below.

== Accounting for initial investments ==
As ownership rights in a partnership are divided among two or more partners, separate capital and drawing accounts are maintained for each partner.

=== Investment of cash ===
If a partner invested cash in a partnership, the Cash account of the partnership is debited, and the partner's capital account is credited for the invested amount.

=== Investment of assets other than cash ===
If a partner invested an asset other than cash, an asset account is debited, and the partner's capital account is credited for the market value of the assets.

If a certain amount of money is owed for the asset, the partnership may assume liability. In that case an asset account is debited, and the partner's capital account is credited for the difference between the market value of the asset invested and liabilities assumed.

== Capital interest ==
A capital interest is an interest that would give the holder a share of the proceeds in either of the following situations:

- The owner withdraws from the partnership.
- The partnership liquidates.

The mere right to share in earnings and profits is not a capital interest in the partnership. This determination generally is made at the time of receipt of the partnership interest.

== Capital accounting ==
Capital account of each partner represents his equity in the partnership.

Capital account of a partner is increased in the following situations:

- The owner made additional investments during the year.
- The owner made guaranteed payments to the firm.
- Partnership earned profits, and a share of profits was allocated to the partner.

The increase in the capital will record in credit side of the capital account.

Salary and interest allowances are guaranteed payments, discussed later.

Capital account of a partner is decreased when the owner makes withdrawals of cash or property

== Compensation for services and capital ==
The partnership agreement may specify that partners should be compensated for services they provide to the partnership and for capital invested by partners.

For example, one partner contributed more of the assets, and works full-time in the partnership, while the other partner contributed a smaller amount of assets and does not provide as much services to the partnership.

Compensation for services is provided in the form of salary allowance. Compensation for capital is provided in the form of interest allowance. Amount of compensation is added to the capital account of the partner.

To illustrate, assume that a partner received $500 as an interest allowance. The amount is included in the net income/loss distribution entry when the books are closed to the capital accounts at year end:

	Debit	Credit
Partner A, Capital		$500
Income Summary	$500	

As a result, the above entry Income Summary, which is a temporary equity closing account used for year-end, is reduced by $500, and the capital account is increased by the same amount.

When the partner makes a cash withdrawal of moneys he received as an allowance, it is treated as a withdrawal, or drawing.

	Debit	Credit
Partner A, Drawing	$500	
Cash		$500

As a result, Drawing account increased by $500, and the Cash account of the partnership is reduced by the same account.

At the end of the accounting period the drawing account is closed to the capital account of the partner. The capital account will be reduced by the amount of drawing made by the partner during the accounting period.

== Guaranteed payments ==
Guaranteed payments are those made by a partnership to a partner that are determined without regard to the partnership's income. Compensation for services and capital are guaranteed payments.

A partnership treats guaranteed payments for services, or for the use of capital, as if they were made to a person who is not a partner. This treatment is for purposes of determining gross income and deductible business expenses only.

== Allocation of net income ==
$Revenues - expenses = net income$

If total revenues exceed total expenses of the period, the excess is the net income of the partnership for the period. If expenses exceed revenues of the period, the excess is a net loss of the partnership for the period.

Management fees, salary and interest allowances are guaranteed payments. The partnership generally deducts guaranteed payments on line 10 of Form 1065 as business expenses.

If partners pay themselves high salaries, net income will be low, but it does not matter for tax purposes. Partner compensation and allocated net income are considered ordinary income for tax purposes and as such are reported on the form 1040. It does not matter whether or not a partner withdrew any amount of money from his capital account. .

Net income or loss is allocated to the partners in accordance with the partnership agreement. In the absence of any agreement between partners, profits and losses must be shared equally regardless of the ratio of the partners' investments. If the partnership agreement specifies how profits are to be shared, losses must be shared on the same basis as profits. Net income does not includes gains or losses from the partnership investment.

== Closing process ==
Closing process at the end of the accounting period includes closing of all temporary accounts by making the following entries.

- Close all revenues accounts to Income Summary.
- Close all expenses accounts to Income Summary.
- Close Income Summary by allocating each partner's share of net income or loss to the individual capital account.
- Close each partner's drawing account to the individual capital accounts.

To illustrate, assume that there are two equal partners, Partner A and Partner B. The partnership agreement specifies that after providing for salary and interest allowances the remaining income is divided equally. Assume also that net income of the partnership was $100,000 and the two partners received allowances as indicated in the table below.

The allocation of net income would be reported on the income statement as shown.

Net Income $100,000

	Partner A	Partner B	Total
Net Income of partnership			100,000
Salary allowances	30,000	20,000	50,000
Interest allowances	20,000	10,000	30,000
Remaining income			20,000
Remaining income shares	10,000	10,000	20,000
Allocated shares	60,000	40,000	100,000

Net Income of the partnership is calculated by subtracting total expenses from total revenues. After that salary and interest allowances are subtracted from Net Income, and the result is Remaining Income, which is divided equally in accordance with the partnership agreement.

At the end of the accounting period each partner's allocated share is closed to his capital account. Based on the net income allocation shown above, the closing entry is:

	Debit	Credit
Income Summary	$100,000	
Partner A, Capital		$60,000
Partner B, Capital		$40,000

== Statements for partnerships ==
The allocation of net income and its impact on the partners' capital balances must be disclosed in the financial statements. All three financial statements are affected: the income statement, statement of owners (partners') equity, and balance sheet. In addition, the statement of partners' equity reflects the equity of each partner and summarizes the allocation of net income for the year.

=== Statement of partners' equity ===
Statement of partners' equity starts with capital balances at the beginning of the accounting period, and reflects additional investments, made by the partners during the year, net income for the period, and withdrawals.

Additional investments and allocated net income increase capital accounts of the partners. All kind of allowances, like salary allowances and capital allowances, are treated as withdrawals. Withdrawals reduce capital accounts. The result is capital balances of the partners at the end of the accounting period.

A sample statement of partners' equity is shown below.

	Partner A	Partner B	Total
Capital, Jan. 1	$40,000	$30,000	$70,000
Additional investments	$10,000	$20,000	$30,000
Capital plus investments	$50,000	$50,000	$100,000
Net Income for the year	$60,000	$40,000	$100,000
Balance	$110,000	$90,000	$200,000
Withdrawals	$30,000	$20,000	$50,000
Capital, Dec. 31	$80,000	$70,000	$150,000

=== Equity section of the balance sheet ===
The partners' equity section of the balance sheet reports the equity of each partner, as illustrated below.

Partner A, Capital	$80,000	
Partner B, Capital	$70,000	
Total partners' equity		$150,000

== Admitting a new partner ==
A new partner may be admitted by agreement among the existing partners. When this happens, the old partnership may or may not be dissolved and a new partnership may be created, with a new partnership agreement. For US tax purposes, a technical termination may be caused if more than 50% of the partnership interests change hands in the same (US) tax year.

A new partner may buy into the business in three ways:

- by purchasing an interest directly from existing partners
- by making an investment in the business, or
- by contributing assets from an existing business.

Assume that Partner A and Partner B admit Partner C as a new partner, when Partner A and Partner B have capital interests $30,000 and $20,000, respectively.

Partner C pays, say, $15,000 to Partner A for one-third of his interest, and $15,000 to Partner B for one-half of his interest. These payments go to the partners directly, not to the business. The following entry is made by the partnership.

	Debit	Credit
Partner A, Capital	10,000	
Partner B, Capital	10,000	
Partner C, Capital		20,000

The extra $5,000 Partner C paid to each of the partners, represents profit to them, but it has no effect on the partnership's financial statements.

Now, assume instead that Partner C invested $30,000 cash in the new partnership. In this case, the following entry would be made to admit Partner C.

	Debit	Credit
Cash	30,000	
Partner C, Capital		30,000

Finally, let's assume that Partner C had been operating his own business, which was then taken over by the new partnership. In this case the balance sheet for the new partner's business would serve as a basis for preparing the opening entry. The assets listed in the balance sheet are taken over, the liabilities are assumed, and the new partner's capital account is credited for the difference.

== Allocation of ownership interest ==
=== Equal partners ===
Example 1. Assume that a sole proprietor agreed to admit a single equal partner for a certain amount of money. The sole proprietor, Partner A, will give the new partner, Partner B, an equal share in the partnership. 100% interest of the sole proprietor will be divided in half, so that each of the two partners will have 50% interest in the partnership. In effect, Partner A sold 50% of his equity to Partner B.

Example 2. Assume that Partner A and Partner B have 50% interest each, and they agreed to admit Partner C and give him an equal share of ownership. Each of the three partners will have 33.3% interest in the partnership. Interests of Partner A and Partner B will be reduced from 50% each to 33.3% each. In effect, each of the two partners sold 16.7% of his equity to Partner C.

=== Unequal partners ===
Example 1. Assume there are two unequal partners in the partnership. Partner A owns 60% equity, Partner B owns 40% equity, and they agreed to admit a third partner. Partner C has several options to join the partnership.

- He can buy equity from Partner A.
- He can buy equity from Partner B.
- He can buy equity from Partner A and Partner B.

Partner A and Partner B may both agree to sell 50% of their equity to Partner C. In that case, Partner A will have 30% interest, Partner B will have 20%, and Partner C will own (30% + 20%) 50% interest in the partnership.

Partner A and Partner B may both agree to sell 25% of their equity to Partner C. In that case, Partner 3 will own (15% + 10%) 25% interest in the partnership.

Partner A may decide to sell 25% of his equity to partner C. Partner B may decide to sell 50% of his equity to partner C. Partner C will own (15% + 20%) 35% of the partnership equity.

Example 2. Assume now that there are three partners. Partner A owns 50% interest, Partner B owns 30% interest, and Partner C owns 20% interest. Collectively, they own 100% interest in the partnership.

They agreed to admit a fourth partner, Partner D. As in the previous case, Partner D has a number of options. He can buy shares of interest from one of the partners, or from more than one partner.

Assume that the three partners agreed to sell 20% of interest in the partnership to the new partner. There are more than one way to realign partnership interests.

=== Equal percentage reduction ===
The three partners may agree to reduce their equity by equal percentage. In order to sell 20% equity to new partner, each of the partners has to sell (20% : 3) 6.7% of his equity to the new partner.

=== Equal proportion reduction ===
The three partners may choose equal proportion reduction instead of equal percentage reduction.

Had there been only one partner, who owned 100% interest, selling 20% interest would reduce ownership interest of the original owner by 20%. The same approach can be used to buy equity from each of the partners.

Each of the existing partners may agree to sell 20% of his equity to the new partner. The result for the new partner will be the same as if a single owner sold him 20% interest.

This table illustrates realignment of ownership interests before and after admitting the new partner.

	Before	After
Partner A	50%	(50% * 80%) 40%
Partner B	30%	(30% * 80%) 24%
Partner C	20%	(20% * 80%) 16%
Partner D	0%	20%

To summarize, there does not exist any standard way to admit a new partner. A new partner can be admitted only by agreement among the existing partners. When this happens, the old partnership is dissolved and a new partnership is created, with a new partnership agreement.

== Partnership bonus ==
=== Bonus paid to the partnership ===
A new partner may pay a bonus in order to join the partnership. Bonus is the difference between the amount contributed to the partnership and equity received in return.

Assume that Partner A and Partner B have balances $10,000 each on their capital accounts. The partners agree to admit Partner C to the partnership for $16,000. In return, Partner C will receive one-third equity in the partnership. The following table illustrates calculation of the bonus.

Equity of Partner A	$10,000
Equity of Partner B	$10,000
Contribution of Partner C	$16,000
Total equity after admitting Partner C	$36,000
Equity percentage of Partner C	33.3%
Equity of Partner C	$12,000
Contribution of Partner C	$16,000
Minus equity of Partner C	$12,000
Bonus paid to "A & B Partnership"	$4,000

In this case, Partner C paid $4,000 bonus to join the partnership. The amount of any bonus paid to the partnership is distributed among the partners. The following table illustrates the distribution of the bonus.

	Debit	Credit
Cash	$16,000	
Partner C, Capital		$12,000
Partner A, Capital		$2,000
Partner B, Capital		$2,000

=== Bonus paid to a partner ===
Assume now that Partner A and Partner B have balances $10,000 each on their capital accounts. The partners agree to admit Partner C to the partnership for $7,000. In return, Partner C will receive one-third equity in the partnership, paying less contribution, but brings other value to the business relationship.

The following table illustrates calculation of the bonus.

Equity of Partner A	$10,000
Equity of Partner B	$10,000
Contribution of Partner C	$7,000
Total equity after admitting Partner C	$27,000
Equity percentage of Partner C	33.3%
Equity of Partner C	$9,000
Contribution of Partner C	$7,000
Minus equity of Partner C	$9,000
Bonus paid to Partner C	$2,000

In this case, Partner C received $2,000 bonus to join the partnership. The amount of the bonus paid by the partnership is distributed among the partners according to the partnership agreement.

The following table illustrates the distribution of the bonus. Debit to Cash increases the account, while debit to a capital account of a partner decreases the account.

	Debit	Credit
Cash	$7,000	
Partner C, Capital		$9,000
Partner A, Capital	$1,000	
Partner B, Capital	$1,000	

In an equal partnership bonus paid to a new partner is distributed equally among the partners. In an unequal partnership bonus is distributed according to the partnership agreement.

Assume that Partner A is a 75% partner, and Partner B is a 25% partner. Partner C was admitted to the partnership. He paid $5,000 cash. In return, he received $9,000 equity in the partnership. A $4,000 ($9,000 - $5,000) bonus paid to Partner C would be distributed as follows:

Partner A will pay ($4,000 * 75%) $3,000. His capital account will be debited $3,000.

Partner B will pay ($4,000 * 25%) $1,000. His capital account will be debited $1,000.

	Debit	Credit
Cash	$5,000	
Partner C, Capital		$9,000
Partner A, Capital	$3,000 ($4,000 * 75%)	
Partner B, Capital	$1,000 ($4,000 * 25%)	

== Withdrawal of partner ==
By agreement, a partner may retire and be permitted to withdraw assets equal to, less than, or greater than the amount of his interest in the partnership. The book value of a partner's interest is shown by the credit balance of the partner's capital account.

The balance is computed after all profits or losses have been allocated in accordance with the partnership agreement, and the books closed.

If a retiring partner withdraws cash or other assets equal to the credit balance of his capital account, the transaction will have no effect on the capital of the remaining partners.

To illustrate, assume that several years after the formation of "A, B, & C" partnership Partner C decided to retire. The partners agreed to the withdrawal of cash equal to the amount of Partner C's equity in the assets of the partnership. Assume that the partners' capital accounts had credit balances as follows:

- Partner A $60,000
- Partner B $40,000
- Partner C $30,000

If Partner C withdraws $30,000 in cash, the entry on the books is as follows:

	Debit	Credit
Partner C, Capital	30,000	
Cash		30,000

If a retiring partner agrees to withdraw less than the amount in his capital account, the transaction will increase the capital accounts of the remaining partners.

For example, if Partner C withdraws only $20,000 in settlement of the interest, the difference between Partner C's equity in the assets of the partnership and the amount of cash withdrawn is $10,000 ($30,000 - $20,000).

This difference is divided between the remaining partners on the basis stated in the partnership agreement.

Assume that the partnership agreement specifies that in such a case the difference is divided according to the ratio of their capital interests after allocating net income and closing their drawing accounts. On this basis, Partner A's capital account is credited for $6,000 and Partner B's is credited for $4,000.

The entry in the books of the partnership is as follows:

	Debit	Credit
Partner C, Capital	30,000	
Cash		20,000
Partner A, Capital		6,000
Partner B, Capital		4,000

If a retiring partner withdraws more than the amount in his capital account, the transaction will decrease the capital accounts of the remaining partners. The excess of the amount withdrawn over retiring partner's equity in the partnership is divided between the remaining partners on the basis stated in the partnership agreement. ,000 | |- | Cash | | 30,000 |}

If a retiring partner agrees to withdraw less than the amount in his capital account, the transaction will increase the capital accounts of the remaining partners.

For example, if Partner C withdraws only $20,000 in settlement of the interest, the difference between Partner C's equity in the assets of the partnership and the amount of cash withdrawn is $10,000 ($30,000 - $20,000).

This difference is divided between the remaining partners on the basis stated in the partnership agreement.

Assume that the partnership agreement specifies that in such a case the difference is divided according to the ratio of their capital interests after allocating net income and closing their drawing accounts. On this basis, Partner A's capital account is credited for $6,000 and Partner B's is credited for $4,000.

The entry in the books of the partnership is as follows:

	Debit	Credit
Partner C, Capital	30,000	
Cash		20,000
Partner A, Capital		6,000
Partner B, Capital		4,000

If a retiring partner withdraws more than the amount in his capital account, the transaction will decrease the capital accounts of the remaining partners. The excess of the amount withdrawn over retiring partner's equity in the partnership is divided between the remaining partners on the basis stated in the partnership agreement.

== Purchasing of partner's interest ==
When a partner retires from the business, the partner's interest may be purchased directly by one or more of the remaining partners or by an outside party. If the retiring partner's interest is sold to one of the remaining partners, the retiring partner's equity is merely transferred to the other partner.

For example, assume that Partner C's equity is sold to Partner B. The entry for the transaction on the books of the partnership is as follows:

	Debit	Credit
Partner C, Capital	30,000	
Partner B, Capital		30,000

The amount paid to Partner C by Partner B is a personal transaction and has no effect on the above entry. Any gain or loss resulting from the transaction is a personal gain or loss of the withdrawing partner and not of the business.

If the retiring partner's interest is purchased by an outside party, the retiring partner's equity is transferred to the capital account of the new partner, Partner D.

	Debit	Credit
Partner C, Capital	30,000	
Partner D, Capital		30,000

The amount paid to Partner C by Partner D is also a personal transaction and has no effect on the above entry.

== Death of a partner ==
The death of a partner dissolves the partnership. On the date of death, the accounts are closed and the net income for the year to date is allocated to the partners' capital accounts. Most agreements call for an audit and revaluation of the assets at this time. The balance of the deceased partner's capital account is then transferred to a liability account with the deceased's estate.

== Liquidation of a partnership ==
Liquidation of a partnership generally means that the assets are sold, liabilities are paid, and the remaining cash or other assets are distributed to the partners.

When normal operations are discontinued, adjusting and closing entries are made. Thus, only the assets, liabilities and partners' equity accounts remain open.

If non-cash assets are sold for more than their book value, a gain on the sale is recognized. The gain is allocated to the partners' capital accounts according to the partnership agreement.

If non-cash assets are sold for less than their book value, a loss on the sale is recognized. The loss is allocated to the partners' capital accounts according to the partnership agreement.

== US tax forms ==
=== Schedule M-1 ===
==== Purpose of Schedule M-1 ====
U.S. Return of Partnership Income (IRS Form 1065) contains, among others, Schedule M-1.

The purpose of Schedule M-1 is reconciliation of income (loss) per accounting books with income (loss) per return of the partnership. In other words, it means reconciliation of accounting income with taxable income, because not all accounting income is taxable.

Schedule M-1 starts with net income (loss) per books. Adjustments are made for guaranteed payments, as well as for depreciation and other expenses. As a result, accounting income of a partnership is adjusted, or reconciled, to taxable income.
