= Uniform Partnership Act =

The Uniform Partnership Act (UPA), which includes revisions that are sometimes called the Revised Uniform Partnership Act (RUPA), is a uniform act (similar to a model statute), proposed by the National Conference of Commissioners on Uniform State Laws ("NCCUSL") for the governance of business partnerships by U.S. States. Several versions of UPA have been promulgated by the NCCUSL, the earliest having been put forth in 1914, and the most recent in 1997.

== Revised Uniform Partnership Act ==
The NCCUSL's first revision of UPA was promulgated in 1992 and amended in 1993 and 1994, and again in 2013. The 1994 revision was often referred to as the Revised Uniform Partnership Act (RUPA). Confusion arose when the 1996 and 1997 versions were also called RUPA. Because of this confusion, the NCCUSL now officially refers to each UPA version as "Uniform Partnership Act (year)," where "year" is replaced by the actual year that NCCUSL approved it. Many people still use the term "RUPA" to mean any version from 1994 forward. Thus, "RUPA" may actually imply any version of UPA except the 1914 version.

== UPA and RUPA differences ==
The UPA and RUPA provide rules as to many aspects of a partnership relationship including formation, the ownership of partnership assets, the assessment of fiduciary duties, the settlement of partnership disputes, and termination. Each allows modification of these rules in the individual agreement among the partners. RUPA is significantly more detailed than is the UPA as to the degree to which the partnership agreement may modify the default rules set forth in the statute. RUPA also clarifies the nature of a partnership itself by clearly defining it as an entity rather than an aggregation of individuals. There are also a number of other important differences between UPA (1914) and subsequent versions.

== Enactment by states ==
The 1914 version of the UPA was enacted into law in every state except Louisiana. The most recent revision has been enacted into law by 37 states. The NCCUSL website lists the states that it considers to have adopted these and other uniform acts. However, due to state variations it is not appropriate to rely upon this listing.

The NCCUSL website lists these states and territories as having adopted UPA (1997): Alabama, Alaska, Arizona, Arkansas, California, Colorado, Connecticut, Delaware, District of Columbia, Florida, Hawaii, Idaho, Illinois, Iowa, Kansas, Kentucky, Maine, Maryland, Minnesota, Mississippi, Montana, Nebraska, Nevada, New Jersey, New Mexico, North Dakota, Ohio, Oklahoma, Oregon, South Dakota (substantially similar), Tennessee, Texas (substantially similar), U.S. Virgin Islands, Utah, Vermont, Virginia, Washington, West Virginia, and Wyoming.

== See also ==
- Uniform Limited Partnership Act
- List of Uniform Acts (United States)
- Limited Partnership
- Limited Liability Partnership
