= Partnership =

Business organization in which parties cooperate in an endeavor

A partnership is an agreement where parties agree to cooperate to advance their mutual interests. The partners in a partnership may be individuals, businesses, interest-based organizations, schools, governments or combinations. Organizations may partner to increase the likelihood of each achieving their mission and to amplify their reach. A partnership may result in issuing and holding equity or may be only governed by a contract.

== History ==
Partnerships have a long history; they were already in use in medieval Europe (the commenda) and in the Middle East. According to a 2006 article, the first partnership was implemented in 1383 by Francesco di Marco Datini, a merchant of Prato and Florence. The Covoni company (1336–40) and the Del Buono-Bencivenni company (1336–40) have also been referred to as early partnerships, but they were not formal partnerships.

In Europe, the partnerships contributed to the Commercial Revolution which started in the 13th century. In the 15th century the cities of the Hanseatic League would mutually strengthen each other; a ship from Hamburg to Gdansk would not only carry its own cargo but was also commissioned to transport freight for other members of the league. This practice not only saved time and money, but also constituted a first step toward partnership. This capacity to join forces in reciprocal services became a distinctive feature, and a long lasting success factor, of the Hanseatic team spirit.

A close examination of medieval trade in Europe shows that numerous significant credit based trades were not bearing interest. Hence, pragmatism and common sense called for a fair compensation for the risk of lending money, and a compensation for the opportunity cost of lending money without using it for other fruitful purposes. To circumvent the usury laws edicted by the Church, other forms of reward were created, in particular through the widespread form of partnership called commenda, very popular with Italian merchant bankers. Florentine merchant banks were almost sure to make a positive return on their loans, but this would be before taking into account solvency risks.

In the Middle East, the qirad and mudarabas institutions developed when trade with the Levant, namely the Ottoman Empire and the Muslim Near East, flourished and when early trading companies, contracts, bills of exchange and long-distance international trade were established. After the fall of the Roman Empire, the Levant trade revived from the 10th to 11th century in Byzantine Italy. The eastern and western Mediterranean formed part of a single commercial civilization in the Middle Ages, and the two regions were economically interdependent through trade (in varying degrees).

The Mongols adopted and developed the concepts of liability in relation to investments and loans in Mongol–ortoq partnerships, promoting trade and investment to facilitate the commercial integration of the Mongol Empire. The contractual features of a Mongol-ortoq partnership closely resembled that of qirad and commenda arrangements; however, Mongol investors used metal coins, paper money, gold and silver ingots and tradable goods for partnership investments and primarily financed money-lending and trade activities. Moreover, Mongol elites formed trade partnerships with merchants from Central and Western Asia and Europe, including Marco Polo's family.

== Partnership agreements ==
To come into being, every partnership necessarily involves a partnership agreement, even if it has not been reduced to writing. In common law jurisdictions, a written partnership agreement is not legally required, but partners may benefit from a partnership agreement that articulates the important terms of their relationship.

In business, two or more companies join forces in a joint venture, a buyer–supplier relationship, a strategic alliance or a consortium to i) work on a project (e.g. industrial or research project) which would be too heavy or too risky for a single entity, ii) join forces to have a stronger position on the market, iii) comply with specific regulation (e.g. in some emerging countries, foreigners can only invest in the form of partnerships with local entrepreneurs). In this case, the alliance may be structured in a process comparable to a mergers and acquisitions transaction. A large literature in business and management has paid attention to forming and managing partnership agreements. It has, in particular, shown the role of contracts and relational mechanisms to organize business partnerships.

Partnerships present the involved parties with complex negotiations and special challenges that must be navigated to agreement. Overarching goals, levels of give-and-take, areas of responsibility, lines of authority and succession, how success is evaluated and distributed, and often a variety of other factors must all be negotiated. Once an agreement is reached, the partnership is typically enforceable by civil law, especially if well documented. Partners who wish to make their agreement affirmatively explicit and enforceable typically draw up articles of partnership. Trust and pragmatism are also essential as it cannot be expected that everything can be written in the initial partnership agreement, therefore quality governance and clear communication are critical success factors in the long run. It is common for information about formally partnered entities to be made public, such as through a press release, a newspaper ad, or public records laws.

== Partner compensation ==
Partner compensation will often be defined by the terms of a partnership agreement. Partners who work for the partnership may receive compensation for their labor before any division of profits between partners.

=== Equity vs. salaried partners ===
In certain partnerships of individuals, particularly law firms and accounting firms, equity partners are distinguished from salaried partners (or contract or income partners). The degree of control which each type of partner exerts over the partnership depends on the relevant partnership agreement.

- An equity partner is a part-owner of the business, and is entitled to a proportion of the distributable profits of the partnership.
- A salaried partner who is paid a salary but does not have any underlying ownership interest in the business and will not share in the distributions of the partnership (although it is quite common for salaried partners to receive a bonus based on the firm's profitability).

Although individuals in both categories are described as partners, equity partners and salaried partners have little in common other than joint and several liability. In many legal systems, salaried partners are not technically "partners" at all in the eyes of the law. However, if their firm holds them out as partners, they are nonetheless subject to joint and several liabilities.

In their most basic form, equity partners enjoy a fixed share of the partnership (usually, but not always an equal share with the other partners) and, upon distribution of profits, receive a portion of the partnership's profits proportionate to that share. In more sophisticated partnerships, different models exist for determining either ownership interest, profit distribution, or both. Two common alternate approaches to distribution of profit are "lockstep" and "source of origination" compensation (sometimes referred to, more graphically, as "eat what you kill").

- Lockstep involves new partners joining the partnership with a certain number of "points". As time passes, they accrue additional points, until they reach a set maximum sometimes referred to as a plateau. The length of time it takes to reach the maximum is often used to describe the firm (so, for example, one could say that one firm has a "seven-year lockstep" and another has a "ten-year lockstep" depending on the length of time it takes to reach maximum equity).
- Source of origination involves the compensation of profits according to a formula that takes into consideration the amount of revenue and profit generated by each partner, such that partners who generate more revenue receive a greater share of the partnership's distributed profit.

=== Law firms ===
The source of origination compensation is rarely seen outside of law firms. The principle is simply that each partner receives a share of the partnership profits up to a certain amount, with any additional profits being distributed to the partner who was responsible for the "origination" of the work that generated the profits.

British law firms tend to use the lockstep principle, whereas American firms are more accustomed to source of origination. When British firm Clifford Chance merged with American firm Rogers & Wells, many of the difficulties associated with that merger were blamed on the difficulties of merging a lockstep culture with a source of origination culture.

== Taxation ==
Partnerships recognized by a government body may enjoy special benefits from taxation policy. Among developed countries, for example, business partnerships are often favored over corporations in taxation policy, since dividend taxes only occur on profit before they are distributed to the partners. However, depending on the partnership structure and the jurisdiction in which it operates, owners of a partnership may be exposed to greater personal liability than they would as shareholders of a corporation. In such countries, partnerships are often regulated via antitrust laws, so as to inhibit monopolistic practices and foster free market competition. Enforcement of the laws, however, varies considerably. Domestic partnerships recognized by governments typically enjoy tax benefits, as well.

== Common law ==
At common law, members of a business partnership are personally liable for the debts and obligations of the partnership. Forms of partnership have evolved that may limit a partner's liability.

=== Forms of partnership ===
The general partnership, in which all partners manage the business and are personally liable for its debts, developed under common law. General partners have an obligation of strict liability to third parties injured by the Partnership. General partners may have joint liability or joint and several liability depending upon circumstances.

The limited partnership (LP) is a partnership in which general partners manage the partnership's operations, and limited partners forego the right to manage the business in exchange for limited liability for the partnership debts. The liability of limited partners is limited to their investment in the partnership. This form of partnership was developed in the 19th century, the U.K. where it was imparted by charter, and in the U.S. where it was created by statute.

More recently, additional forms of partnership have been recognized:

- limited liability partnership (LLP): a form of partnership in which all partners may have some degree of limited liability.
- limited liability limited partnership (LLLP): a form of limited partnership in which general partners have limited liability for the debts and obligations of the limited partnership.

=== Silent partners ===
A silent partner or sleeping partner is one who still shares in the profits and losses of the business, but who is not involved in its management. Sometimes the silent partner's interest in the business will not be publicly known. A silent partner is often an investor in the partnership, who is entitled to a share of the partnership's profits. Silent partners may prefer to invest in limited partnerships in order to insulate their personal assets from the debts or liabilities of the partnership.

=== Oceania ===
==== Australia ====
Summarising s. 5 of the Partnership Act 1958 (Vic), for a partnership in Australia to exist, four main criteria must be satisfied. They are:

- Valid Agreement between the parties;
- To carry on a business – this is defined in s. 3 as "any trade, occupation or profession";
- In Common – meaning there must be some mutuality of rights, interests and obligations;
- View to Profit – thus charitable organizations cannot be partnerships (charities are typically incorporated associations under Associations Incorporations Act 1981 (Vic))

Partners share profits and losses. A partnership is basically a settlement between two or more groups or firms in which profit and loss are equally divided

=== South Asia ===
==== Bangladesh ====
In Bangladesh, the relevant law for regulating partnership is the Partnership Act 1932. A partnership is defined as the relation between persons who have agreed to share the profits of a business carried on by all or any of them acting for all. The law does not require written partnership agreement between the partners to form a partnership. A partnership is not required to be registered, but a partnership is considered as a separate legal identity from its owners only if the partnership is registered. There must be a minimum of 2 partners and maximum of 20 partners.

==== India ====
According to section 4 of the Partnership Act of 1932,"Partnership is defined as the relation between two or more persons who have agreed to share the profits of a business carried on by all or any one of them acting for all". This definition superseded the previous definition given in section 239 of Indian Contract Act 1872 as – "Partnership is the relation which subsists between persons who have agreed to combine their property, labor, skill in some business, and to share the profits thereof between them". The 1932 definition added the concept of mutual agency. The Indian Partnerships have the following common characteristics:

1) A partnership firm is not a legal entity apart from the partners constituting it. It has limited identity for the purpose of tax law as per section 4 of the Partnership Act of 1932.

2) Partnership is a concurrent subject. Contracts of partnerships are included in the Entry no.7 of List III of The Constitution of India (the list constitutes the subjects on which both the State government and Central (National) Government can legislate i.e. pass laws on).

3) Unlimited Liability. The major disadvantage of partnership is the unlimited liability of partners for the debts and liabilities of the firm. Any partner can bind the firm and the firm is liable for all liabilities incurred by any firm on behalf of the firm. If property of partnership firm is insufficient to meet liabilities, personal property of any partner can be attached to pay the debts of the firm.

4) Partners are Mutual Agents. The business of firm can be carried on by all or any of them acting for all. Any partner has authority to bind the firm. Act of any one partner is binding on all the partners. Thus, each partner is 'agent' of all the remaining partners. Hence, partners are 'mutual agents'. Section 18 of the Partnership Act, 1932 says "Subject to the provisions of this Act, a partner is the agent of the firm for the purpose of the business of the firm"

5) Oral or Written Agreements. The Partnership Act, 1932 nowhere mentions that the Partnership Agreement is to be in written or oral format. Thus the general rule of the Contract Act applies that the contract can be 'oral' or 'written' as long as it satisfies the basic conditions of being a contract i.e. the agreement between partners is legally enforceable. A written agreement is advisable to establish existence of partnership and to prove rights and liabilities of each partner, as it is difficult to prove an oral agreement.

6) Number of Partners is minimum 2 and maximum 50 in any kind of business activities. Since partnership is 'agreement' there must be minimum two partners. The Partnership Act does not put any restrictions on maximum number of partners. However, section 464 of Companies Act 2013, and Rule 10 of Companies (Miscellaneous) Rules, 2014 prohibits partnership consisting of more than 50 for any businesses, unless it is registered as a company under Companies Act, 2013 or formed in pursuance of some other law. Some other law means companies and corporations formed via some other law passed by Parliament of India.

7) Mutual agency is the real test. The real test of 'partnership firm' is 'mutual agency' set by the Courts of India, i.e. whether a partner can bind the firm by his act, i.e. whether he can act as agent of all other partners.

=== North America ===
==== Canada ====
Statutory regulation of partnerships in Canada fall under provincial jurisdiction. A partnership is not a separate legal entity and partnership income is taxed at the rate of the partner receiving the income. It can be deemed to exist regardless of the intention of the partners. Common elements considered by courts in determining the existence of a partnership are that two or more legal persons:

- are carrying on a business,
- in common,
- with a view to profit.

==== United States ====
Under U.S. law a partnership is a business association of two or more individuals, through which partners share the profits and responsibility for the liabilities of their venture. U.S. states recognize forms of limited partnership that may allow a partner who does not participate in the business venture to avoid liability for the partnership's debts and obligations. Partnerships typically pay less taxes than corporations in fields like fund management.

The federal government of the United States does not have specific statutory law governing the establishment of partnerships. Instead, every U.S. state and the District of Columbia has its own statutes and common law that govern partnerships. The National Conference of Commissioners on Uniform State Laws has issued non-binding model laws (called uniform act) in which to encourage the adoption of uniformity of partnership law into the states by their respective legislatures. Model laws include the Uniform Partnership Act and the Uniform Limited Partnership Act. Most U.S. states have adopted a form of the Uniform Partnership Act, which includes provisions regulating general partnerships, limited partnerships and limited liability partnerships.

Although the federal government does not have specific statutory law for establishing partnerships, it has an extensive statutory and regulatory scheme for the taxation of partnerships, set forth in the Internal Revenue Code (IRC) and Code of Federal Regulations. The IRC defines federal tax obligations for partnership operations that effectively serve as federal regulation of some aspects of partnerships.

=== East Asia ===
==== China ====
A partnership in the People's Republic of China is a business entity governed by the Partnership Enterprise Law passed by the Standing Committee of the National People's Congress to authorize and govern partnership enterprises. A partnership is a type of business entity in which partners share with each other the profits or losses of the business undertaking in which all have invested.

==== Hong Kong ====
A partnership in Hong Kong is a business entity formed by the Hong Kong Partnerships Ordinance, which defines a partnership as "the relation between persons carrying on a business in common with a view of profit" and is not a joint stock company or an incorporated company. If the business entity registers with the Registrar of Companies it takes the form of a limited partnership defined in the Limited Partnerships Ordinance. However, if this business entity fails to register with the Registrar of Companies, then it becomes a general partnership as a default.

=== Europe ===
==== United Kingdom limited partnership ====
A limited partnership in the United Kingdom consists of:

- One or more people called general partners, who are liable for all debts and obligations of the firm; and
- One or of the firm beyond the amount contributed.

Limited partners may not:

- Draw out or receive back any part of their contributions to the partnership during its lifetime; or
- Take part in the management of the business or have power to bind the firm.

If they do, they become liable for all the debts and obligations of the firm up to the amount drawn out or received back or incurred while taking part in the management, as the case may be.

== See also ==
- Alliance
- Consortium
- Business partnering
- Corporation
- General partnership
- Joint venture
- Keiretsu
- Limited liability partnership (LLP)
- Limited partnership (LP)
- Partnership accounting
- Partnership taxation
- Strategic Alliance
- Types of business entity
- Up or out (aka partnership system)
