= General partnership =

Basic form of partnership under common law

A general partnership, the basic form of partnership under common law, is in most countries an association of persons or an unincorporated company with the following major features:

- Must be created by agreement, proof of existence and estoppel.
- Formed by two or more persons
- The owners are jointly and severally liable for any legal actions and debts the company may face, unless otherwise provided by law or in the agreement.

It is a partnership in which partners share equally in both responsibility and liability.

== Characteristics ==
Partnerships have certain default characteristics relating to both (a) the relationship between the individual partners and (b) the relationship between the partnership and the outside world. The former can generally be overridden by express agreement between the partners. Whilst the latter is in general hardly varied, a careful draft would oust certain kinds of third party liability. A clause can contain that only the negligent partners can be sued and it is the wrongdoers that pay damages to victims only.

Subject to contrary agreement, the assets of the business are owned on behalf of all partners, and they are each personally liable, jointly and severally, for business debts, taxes or tortious liability. For example, if a partnership defaults on a payment to a creditor, the partners' personal assets are subject to attachment and liquidation to pay the creditor.

By default, profits are shared in accordance with the proportion of capital contribution amongst the partners. However, a partnership agreement will almost invariably expressly provide for the manner in which profits and losses are to be shared in accordance with that proportion. Liability, on the other hand, will not be shared equally unless express provisions indicate such possibility.

Each general partner is deemed the agent of the partnership. Therefore, if that partner is apparently carrying on partnership business, all general partners can be held out as partners for his dealings with third persons.

By default a partnership will terminate upon the death, disability, or even withdrawal of any one partner. However, most partnership agreements provide that in these types of events, (1) the share of the departed partner usually remains in the partnership or is given to an identified successor, and (2) the partnership will be dissolved. It is important to exclude duration on fixed term so that dissolution by notice and s.27 of the Partnership Act never apply.

By default, each general partner has an equal right to participate in the management and control of the business. Disagreements in the ordinary course of partnership business are decided by a majority of the partners, and disagreements of extraordinary matters and amendments to the partnership agreement require the consent of all partners. However, in a partnership of any size the partnership agreement will provide for certain electees to manage the partnership along the lines of a company board.

Unless otherwise provided in the partnership agreement, no one can become a member of the partnership without the consent of all partners, though a partner may assign his share of the profits and losses and right to receive distributions ("transferable interest"). A partner's judgment creditor may obtain an order charging the partner's "transferable interest" to satisfy a judgment.

== Separate legal personality ==
While France, Luxembourg, Norway, Czechia and Sweden also grant some degree of legal personality to business partnerships, other countries such as Belgium, Germany, Italy, Switzerland and Poland do not allow partnerships to acquire a separate legal personality, but permit partnerships the rights to sue and be sued, to hold property, and to postpone a creditor's lawsuit against the partners until he or she has exhausted all remedies against the partnership assets.

In Bangladesh, the relevant law for regulating partnership is the Partnership Act 1932. A partnership is defined as the relation between persons who have agreed to share the profits of a business carried on by all or any of them acting for all. The law does not require written partnership agreement between the partners to form a partnership. A partnership does not also required to be registered, however an unregistered partnership has a number of limitation regarding enforcing its rights in any court. A partnership is considered as a separate legal identity (i.e. separate from its owners) in Bangladesh only if the partnership is registered. There must be a minimum of 2 partners and maximum of 20 partners.

In England and Wales, a partnership does not have separate legal personality. Although the English & Welsh Law Commission proposed to amend the law to create separate personality for all general partnerships, the British government decided not to implement the proposals relating to general partnerships. The Limited Liability Partnerships Act 2000 confers separate personality on limited liability partnerships—separating them almost entirely from general partnerships and limited partnerships, despite the naming similarities. In Scotland partnerships do have some degree of legal personality.

Japanese law provides for Civil Code partnerships (組合, kumiai), which have no legal personality, and Commercial Code partnership corporations (持分会社, mochibun kaisha), which have full corporate personhood but otherwise function similarly to partnerships.

In December 2002 the Netherlands proposed to replace their general partnership, which does not have legal personality, with a public partnership which allows the partners to opt for legal personality.

In the United States, section 201 of the Revised Uniform Partnership Act (RUPA) of 1997 provides that "A partnership is an entity distinct from its partners." This is one of the more significant departures of RUPA from the 1917 Uniform Partnership Act, which does not recognize separate legal personality for partnerships; however, the degree to which this theory was actually respected varied by jurisdiction and over time.

The two main consequences of allowing separate personality are that one partnership will be able to become a partner in another partnership in the same way that a registered company can, and a partnership will not be bound by the doctrine of ultra vires but will have unlimited legal capacity like any other natural person.

== See also ==
- Articles of partnership
- Investment clubs
- Types of business entity (listed by country)
