= Articles of partnership =

Articles of partnership is a voluntary contract between/among two or more persons to place their capital, labor, and skills into a business, with the understanding that there will be a sharing of the profits and losses between/among partners. Outside of North America, it is normally referred to simply as a partnership agreement.

A partnership agreement is a written and legal agreement between/among business partners. It is always recommended but not essential for partners to have such an agreement.

== Articles of partnership ==
Multiple sections are often included in articles of partnership, based on the circumstances:

- the granting of the partner the rights to manage and administer the business or a specific department.
- the authorization of a majority of partners to manage the affairs of the entire partnership. This is particularly common where there are numerous partners.
- provisions to account for, annually, the property and debts of the business.
- the forbidding of any partner to carry out business unrelated to the partnership. This is usually implied in articles of partnership.
- the allowance of expelling partners who commit gross misconduct or become insolvent, bankrupt, etc. This is particularly common where there are numerous partners.
- the submission of arguments to arbitration.
- the allocation of business income and losses among partners.

== See also ==
- General partnership
