= History of inheritance taxes in the United Kingdom =

The history of inheritance taxes in the United Kingdom has undergone significant change and mutation since their original introduction in 1694.

== Duties before Finance Act 1894 ==
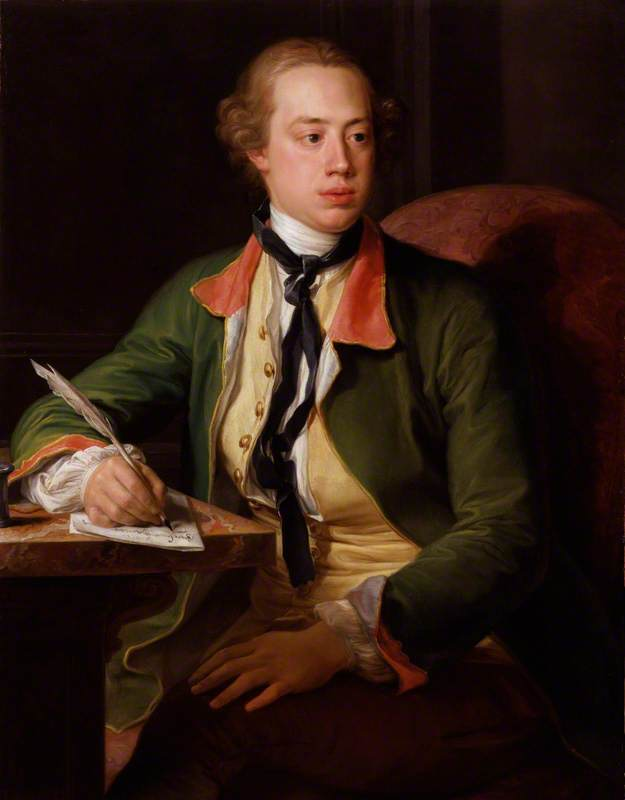
Lord North expanded the probate duty and created the legacy duty

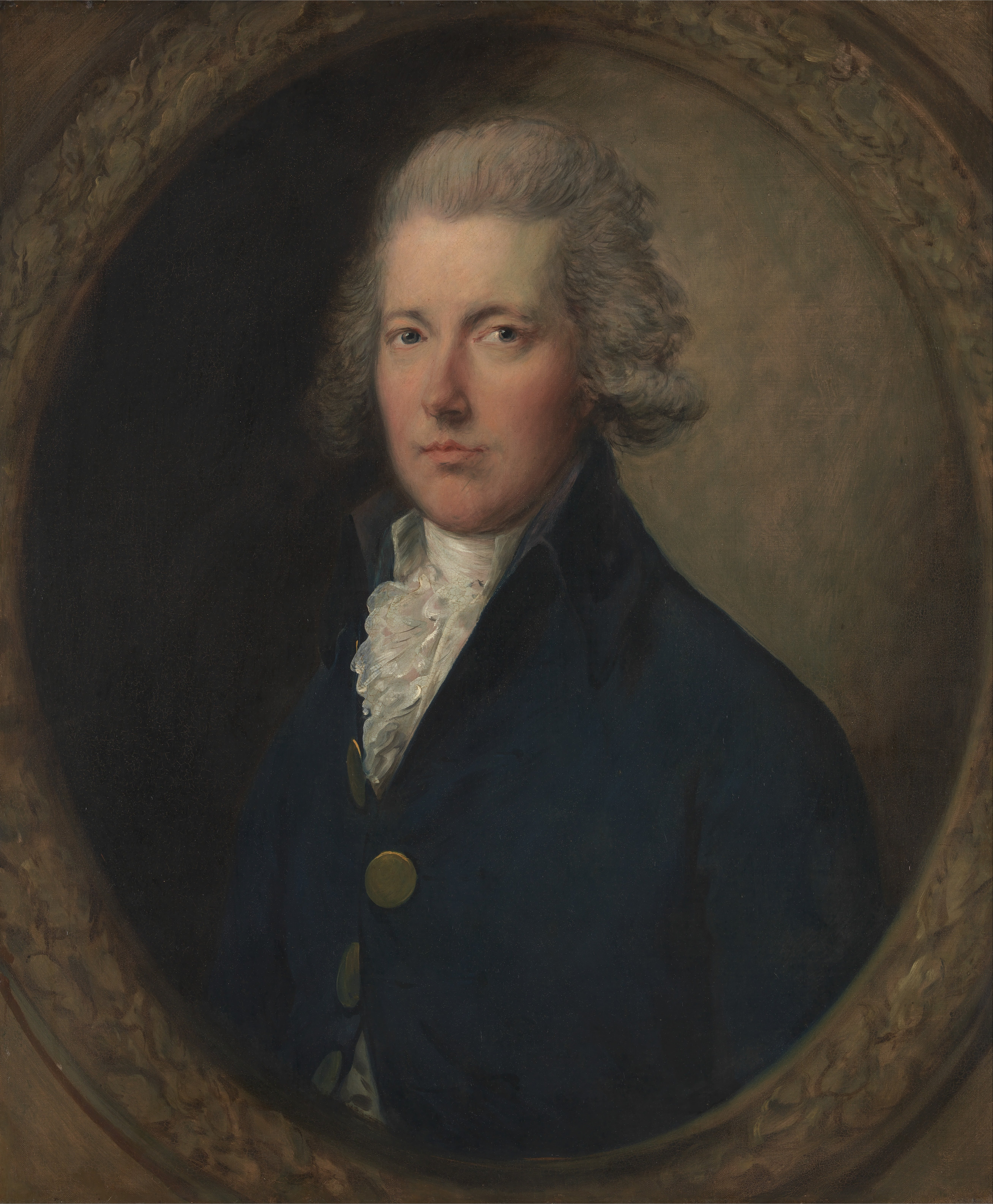
William Pitt the Younger made enforcement more effective

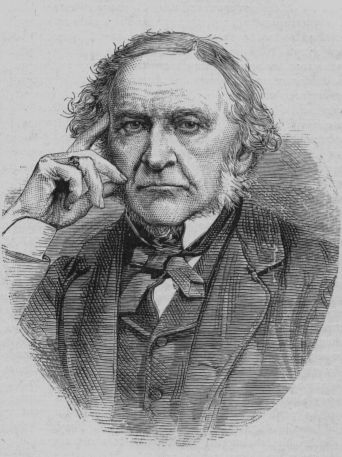
William Gladstone introduced succession duty

Principal figures for the earlier duties

Probate duty was introduced as part of the Stamps Act 1694, in order to help finance England's involvement in the War of the League of Augsburg. It originally applied to all probates of wills and letters of administration for personal estates valued greater than £20, at a fixed duty of 5 s. (one crown, or a quarter of a pound). It was converted into a graduated rate in 1780 by Lord North, as a consequence of financing British activity in the American Revolutionary War. Penalties for failing to file probate or administration documents were introduced in 1795, and accounts for calculating liability were first required in 1805. As probate and administration were unknown in Scotland, inventory duty was introduced in 1804 to provide for similar liability there. Ireland introduced probate duty separately in 1774.

Legacy duty was also imposed in 1780, initially upon receipts or discharges given with respect to a legacy. As receipts were not in practice given or required, revenues were insignificant until William Pitt the Younger reformed the regime to require executors to account for the property in question, as well as varying rates according to the type of collateral succession. Further measures and later court decisions clarified the duty's extent.

Probate and legacy duty focused on the legacy of the estate, as opposed to its devise, thus excluding real property from taxation. Neither duty captured property passing by way of settlement, which was outside the scope of probate and administration. Succession duty was introduced by William Gladstone as a measure to capture more unearned wealth at the point of succession that would not otherwise be chargeable to legacy duty. In that regard, real property was included in its scope, but only on the life interest therein, as opposed to its full market value. Leasehold interests were excluded from legacy duty, thus having them fall within the new duty.

The administration of legacy and succession duties was integrated in 1881, with the requirement that no probate or letters of administration would be granted by the court if a court officer cannot certify that an affidavit has been filed stating the estate's value and stamped where liability for duty is shown. Relief from legacy and succession duties at the rate of 1% was allowed on such affidavits and inventories filed and stamped, and a penalty equal to double the amount of duty due was imposed on any person failing to file them on time. Account duty was also introduced, charging certain gifts and voluntary settlements to be taxed.

Additional succession duties were introduced in 1888:

- on any successor who is the lineal issue or lineal ancestor of the predecessor, 10 s. per centum (0.5%)
- in all other cases, £1 10 s. per centum (1.5%)
- but this additional duty does not apply to interests in leaseholds passing by will or by devolution by law, nor to property subject to account duty

Corporation duty was imposed in 1885, and a temporary estate duty in 1889 (intended to last until 1896), to encompass activities which the previous duties had not captured.

Scheme of UK succession taxes in effect prior to FA 1894 introduction of Estate Duty
Duty	Scope	Paid	Rate
Probate duty (Note: Known as inventory duty in Scotland)	all testate and intestate estates (other than estates pur autre vie), with respect to personal property only; where the deceased had UK domicile, debts and funeral expenses can be deducted from the gross value of the estate; duty payable on all inventories, affidavits for probates and letters of administration, which must be obtained within six months after the decease (Note: Or within two months after the termination of any suit respecting the right to representation, which has not been ended with four months after the death)	By executor or administrator of estate	for estates less than £100, nil; between £100 and £500, £1 per £50 (i.e., 2%) or part thereof; between £500 and £1000, £1 5 s. per £50 (i.e., 2.5%) or part thereof; above £1000, £3 per £100 (i.e., 3%) or part thereof; But, where the gross value of the personal estate is less than £300, a flat rate duty of 30 s. is payable on such estates valued between £100 and £300, which also satisfies any liability for legacy or succession duty.
Legacy duty	Imposed on all deceased persons with UK domicile.; Initially imposed in 1780 as a duty on "every receipt or other discharge for any legacy," it was expanded in 1796 to include "every share or residue of the personal estate of any person dying and leaving such estate of the clear value of £100 or upwards." However, the 1796 Act also declared that money left to pay legacy duty was not chargeable to duty as a legacy.; In 1805, duty is charged on legacies charged upon or made payable out of any real estate, or out of any moneys to arise from the sale of real estate.; In 1815, duty was expanded to include the devolution of personal estate under a partial or total intestacy.; In 1823, it was held that the forgiveness of debt due to a testator constituted a legacy.; In 1845, the definition of "legacy" was expanded to include gifts made by will or testamentary instrument, as well as gifts made as donatio mortis causa.; Only the will can determine what constitutes a legacy, and any secret trust outside it cannot change who the legatee is.; A bequest upon the trusts of a settlement, even if in satisfaction of a covenant, is chargeable with duty, the trusts in effect being incorporated in the will.; In cases where property is disposed by way of a power of appointment, it has been held that a power arising from a will, will constitute a legacy, but one arising from a deed will constitute a gift not subject to duty.; Rentcharges will give rise to duty, but it must be in general a charge in favour of one person on the estate of another.; The gift of the next presentation to a living is a legacy, but the gift of an advowson is not.; A general direction to sell land will render it liable to legacy duty, unless coupled with a direction to invest the proceeds in other real estate, or where a sale is made by order of the court for purposes unconnected with the trust.	At the time of transfer (i.e., satisfaction, payment or discharge) of the legacy.; Generally paid by the executor or administrator; otherwise, if received without deduction of duty, by the relevant trustee or legatee.	Where any legacy, (Note: Including gifts of annuities or by way of annuity) residue or any share of residue is greater than £20: (Note: Where a legatee receives two or more distinct legacies or benefits, they shall be grouped together): to any child, lineal descendant, parent or lineal ascendant, 1%; to any brother or sister, or any of their descendants, 3%; to any brother or sister of a parent, or any descendant of them, 5%; to any brother or sister of a grandparent, or any descendant of them, 6%; to all other persons, 10%
Succession duty	Applies to every succession (conferred by disposition or operation of law) to the beneficial enjoyment of any real or personal property, or to the receipt of any portion or additional portion of the income or profits thereof, upon or in consequence of the death of any person.: Disposition arises from any limitation, provision, condition or other act of man, written or unwritten, by means of which property is disposed of in favour of any particular person, body corporate, company or society named or sufficiently pointed out in such disposition.; Devolution by law arises from the operation by which the law, in the absence of any act of man, carries property to particular persons, such as in the case of intestacy.; The succession to be taxed is the right to possession.; The beneficial interest accruing to a surviving joint tenant is deemed to be a disposition, except where the joint tenants are husband and wife, as they hold the status of tenants by the entirety; An increase in benefit arising from the extinction of any charge, estate or interest in property by the death of a person or at any period ascertainable only by reference to such death is deemed to be a succession, but this does not apply to persons who, at the passing of the Succession Duty Act 1853, possessed estates subject to outstanding leases for lives, or purporting to be leases at rack rent; However: Property may escape the tax forever by always passing inter vivos, but will be taxed when a succession accrues (Note: But it may be subject to account duty as of 1881); Property is exempt where it is already subject to legacy duty, or is already exempt therefrom; Where the deceased does not have UK domicile, personal property in the estate will not be subject to succession duty, but where the resulting will creates a trust that assumes the character of a British settlement and British property, it is liable to duty upon the death of any person who has a limited interest in it	At the time the successor, or any person in his right or on his behalf, becomes entitled to possession of the property.; The value to be included is: For personal property, the total value thereof; For real property where the successor is a body corporate, company or society, the principal value of the property; For all other cases of real property, excepting advowsons and timber, the value is considered to be in the nature of an annuity equal to the net annual value of the property, to be ascertained at the time the interest of the successor accrues; In the case of a succession comprising timber, the value is the sum of the yearly rental in its uncultivated state, plus the net moneys derived from the sale of timber where they exceed £10 per year; Duty arises on an advowson only where a sale is made	In general, the same schedule of rates as for legacy duty.; However, where any person chargeable with succession duty with respect to any succession shall have been married to any wife or husband of nearer consanguinity than himself or herself to the predecessor, testator or deceased person, then the person taking such succession shall pay the same rate of duty as his or her spouse would have been chargeable with as if he or she had taken the succession directly.
Account duty	Personal or moveable property, being: property taken as donatio mortis causa, or as an immediate gift inter vivos made within three months of death; property, to which a person was absolutely entitled, which was vested in joint tenancy that accrues or passes by survivorship upon death; property passing under any past or future voluntary settlement, by deed or any other instrument not taking effect as a will, where the settlor reserved the right to take back the absolute interest in the property	a beneficiary, trustee or any other person who acquires possession or assumes the management of any property included in the account	for estates between £100 and £500, £1 per £50 (i.e., 2%) or part thereof; between £500 and £1000, £1 5 s. per £50 (i.e., 2.5%) or part thereof; above £1,000, £3 per £100 (i.e., 3%) or part thereof; Any stamp duty of 5 s. per £100 (i.e., 0.25%) previously paid on a deed of voluntary arrangement of property included in the account is to be returned upon production of the settlement.
Corporation duty	Income (less applicable expenses) earned from all real and personal property vested in a body corporate or unincorporate, other than property vested in: Any government authority; Any religious persuasion or charitable purpose; Any friendly society or savings bank; A body corporate or unincorporate established for any trade or business, or any body whose capital stock is divided and held to be subject to legacy duty or succession duty; Property acquired by subject bodies corporate or unincorporate with funds contributed within the previous 30 years, whether voluntarily contributed or where legacy or succession duty had been paid thereon, is exempt from such duty. "Body unincorporate" includes every unincorporated company, fellowship, society, and association. It also includes a trustee or trustees of a permanent trust into which property has been vested in circumstances where it was not liable to legacy or succession duty.	All bodies subject to the duty.	5% of the net income concerned
Estate duty	Estates and successions greater than £10,000 in value	In the case of estates, any person filing probate or letters of administration, or exhibiting an inventory in Scotland; In the case of successions, the successor	£1 per £100 (i.e., 1%) or part thereof, payable on the entire value, in addition to any other duty

== Estate duty framework (1894-1949) ==
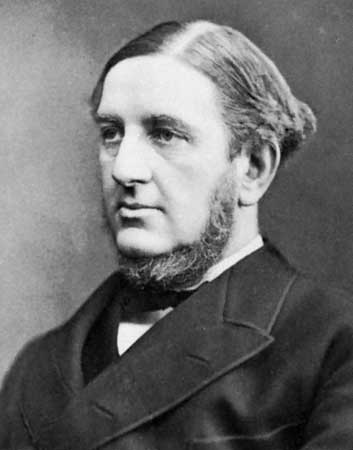
William Harcourt, successful promoter of 1894 reforms

The succession duty's taxation of the life interest in real property, as opposed to its full capital value, was seen to be unfair to heirs of different ages, as elder heirs effectively received a life interest that was lower in value than one received by a younger heir, even when they were shares in the same property.

In his famous 1894 budget, William Harcourt further noted the unfairness of the system that had developed:

The whole system is admittedly difficult and complicated. The Death Duties have grown up piecemeal, and bear traces of their fragmentary origin. They have never been established upon any general principles, and they present an extraordinary specimen of tessellated legislation. Various measures have been made at different times to redress some of their inequalities. Here a patch and there a patch, but each successive modification has only left confusion worse compounded.

In the Finance Act 1894 (57 & 58 Vict. c. 30), estate duty replaced probate duty, account duty, certain additional succession duties, and the 1889 estate duty. (Note: However, these duties still remained in force with respect to deaths that occurred before estate duty came into effect. These duties were not finally repealed until the passage of the Finance Act 1949, and all requirements to account for such duties were repealed by the Finance Act 1975) It was collected in addition to the legacy duty and succession duty which still remained in effect.

With respect to real property, succession duty ceased to be calculated on the value of the life interest in the succession, being instead based on the principal value of the property after deducting the liability for related estate duty, together with expenses incurred in raising funds for paying it.

Scope of estate duty arising from the Finance Act 1894
Duty	Scope	Paid by	Rate in 1894
Estate duty	All property passing on the death of the deceased, at its market value at the date of death, including: the deceased's free estate; property situated outside the United Kingdom; property of which the deceased was competent to dispose; donations mortis causa; gifts inter vivos (from 1910, notably gifts made within three years of death and those made with reservations); property owned jointly or purchased and invested in joint names; insurance policies, annuities and other interests purchased by the deceased; property in which the deceased or any other person had an interest ceasing on the death of the deceased, to the extent that a benefit accrues or arises by his death; property comprised in a settlement; In this regard, "property passing on the death" includes property passing either immediately on the death or after any interval, either certainly or contingently, and either originally or by way of substitutive limitation, and the expression "on the death" includes "at a period ascertainable only by reference to the death". However, the following property is exempt from duty: gifts inter vivos made in consideration or contemplation of marriage, for public or charitable purposes (if made more than a year before death), which form part of the normal expenditure of the deceased, or which amount to less than £100 per donee; settled property upon which probate duty or account duty was paid on the death of the deceased's spouse; immoveable property located outside the UK; moveable property outside the UK, where the deceased has no UK domicile; property held by the deceased in the capacity of an officeholder, recipient of charity or as a corporation sole; property passing by reason of sale or lease for full money consideration; property held by the deceased merely as a trustee; property of soldiers, marines and sailors (Note: and later airmen) who are killed or die in Her Majesty's service; estates of soldiers who are killed or die in service, not over £5,000, provided that they are given to the widow and children concerned; works of art given for national purposes, for which Her Majesty's Treasury has remitted the duty; similar articles of national, scientific, historic or artistic interest, until sold; pensions and annuities granted by the British and Indian governments to widows and children of deceased officers; advowsons and Church patronage; a single annuity, not exceeding £25, purchased or provided by the deceased; interests in expectancy sold or mortgages for full consideration in money before the introduction of estate duty; property settled by a husband or wife before the introduction of estate duty, where the income was enjoyed by the deceased spouse and the property then accrues to the settlor for life (Note: effectively deferring payment of estate duty until the settlor's death); enlargement of interest in property which would have otherwise passed; reverter to the disponer of property which would have otherwise passed; real estate to the rents of which the deceased was entitled in right of his wife; timber, until sold; war securities held by foreigners; allowances with respect to other duties already paid	The estate, but: the executor accounts for all property subject to the duty, he must pay duty on all property that has passed to him, and; the rest of the duty must be paid by the beneficiaries and trustees concerned (except where the executor has already done so)	Where the principal value of the estate: exceeds £100 and does not exceed £500, 1%; exceeds £500 and does not exceed £1,000, 2%; exceeds £1,000 and does not exceed £10,000, 3%; exceeds £10,000 and does not exceed £25,000, 4%; exceeds £25,000 and does not exceed £50,000, 4.5%; exceeds £50,000 and does not exceed £75,000, 5%; exceeds £75,000 and does not exceed £100,000, 5.5%; exceeds £100,000 and does not exceed £150,000, 6%; exceeds £150,000 and does not exceed £250,000, 6.5%; exceeds £250,000 and does not exceed £500,000, 7%; exceeds £500,000 and does not exceed £1,000,000, 7.5%; exceeds £1,000,000, 8%; For small estates, the following reliefs apply: a fixed duty of 30 s. applies where the gross value is greater than £100 but does not exceed £300; a fixed duty of 50 s. applies where the gross value is greater than £300 but does not exceed £500; for all estates where the net value (exclusive of property settled otherwise than by will of the deceased) does not exceed £1,000, settlement estate duty and the legacy and succession duties will not be payable
Settlement estate duty	Additional duty, charged where property in respect of which estate duty is leviable is settled by will of the deceased, or having been settled by some other disposition is passed on death of the deceased, to some other person not competent to dispose of the property.	The estate, but: the executor accounts for all property subject to the duty, he must pay duty on all property that has passed to him, and; the rest of the duty must be paid by the beneficiaries and trustees concerned (except where the executor has already done so)	1% for every £10 of the value of the settlement, or part thereof where such part is deemed to be a full £10

Settlement estate duty was increased to 2% by the Finance Act 1909–10, and was later abolished by the Finance Act 1914.

Estate duty was designed to be a progressive tax. It became more highly progressive over time, with the highest marginal rates fixed as follows:

- in 1907, 15% on taxable amounts over £1,000,000, where the total estate was greater than £3,000,000
- in 1910, 15% on taxable amounts over £1,000,000
- in 1914, 20% on taxable amounts over £1,000,000
- in 1919, 40% on taxable amounts over £2,000,000
- in 1930, 50% on taxable amounts over £2,000,000
- in 1939, 60% on taxable amounts over £2,000,000
- in 1940, 65% on taxable amounts over £2,000,000
- in 1946, 75% on taxable amounts over £2,000,000
- in 1949, 80% on taxable amounts over £1,000,000 (following the abolition of legacy and succession duty)

== Estate duty (1949-1975) ==
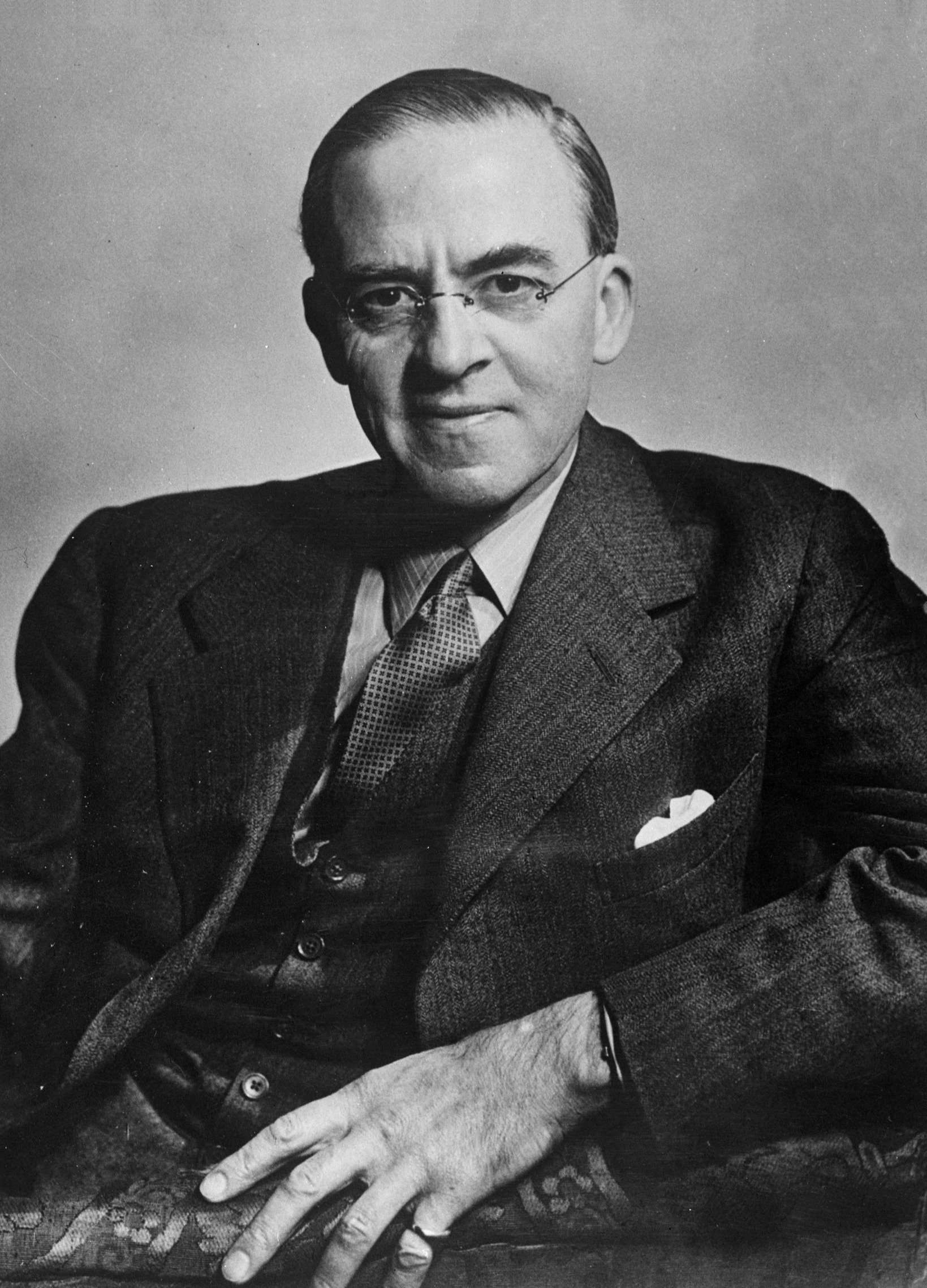
Stafford Cripps, who abolished the legacy and succession duties in 1949

The complexity and unfairness in how the duties were applied was discussed by Stafford Cripps in his 1949 Budget speech:

The Legacy and Succession Duties also have the drawback that they impose a proportionately heavier burden on the small than on the large estate. For example, an estate of £6,000, passing wholly to brothers and sisters, pays a total charge of 3 per cent. Estate Duty and 10 per cent. Legacy and Succession Duties, equivalent to a rate of nearly 13 per cent., or 10 per cent over the Estate Duty rate; whereas, at the other extreme, an estate of £3 million would pay only 2½ per cent. over the rate of Estate Duty. It is, no doubt, because of this unequal incidence of the duty that testators, in fact, leave about two-thirds of the total legacies and bequests free of duty, and in all such cases the Legacy and Succession Duties merely become a wholly illogical, extra Estate Duty, falling upon the residue.

Accordingly, legacy duty and succession duty were abolished by the Finance Act 1949, (Note: However, these duties still remained in force with respect to deaths that occurred before abolition came into effect. These duties were not finally repealed until the passage of the Finance Act 1975) followed by the repeal of corporation duty by the Finance Act 1959. The three-year period for gifts made prior to death was extended to five years by the Finance Act 1946, and then to seven years by the Finance Act 1969.

Estate duty became more progressive in scale, eventually peaking in 1969 with the highest marginal rate fixed at 85% of amounts in excess of £750,000, provided that total duty did not exceed 80% of the value of the total estate.

== Capital Transfer Tax (1975-1986) ==
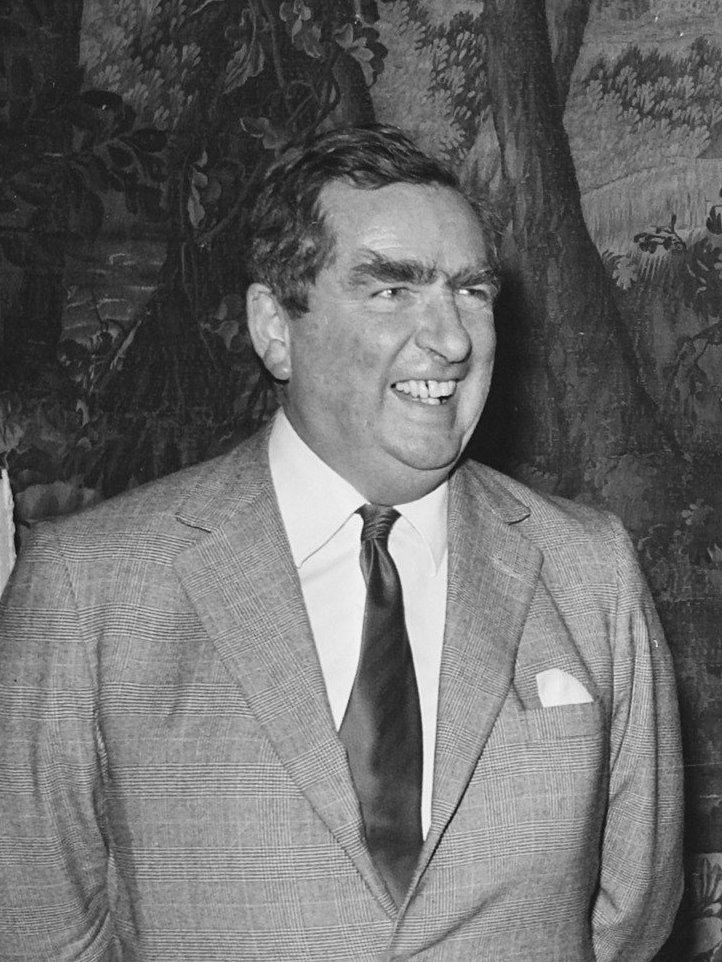
Denis Healey replaced estate duty with the capital transfer tax in 1975

Estate duty was criticised for failing to capture the value of gifts made more than seven years before a person's death, as well as that of any property vested in trusts prior to death. In his 1974 Budget speech, Denis Healey, then Chancellor of the Exchequer, declared:

Nothing is more offensive to the vast majority of ordinary taxpayers, most of whom are subject to PAYE, than the knowledge that people far better off than themselves are avoiding taxation by exploiting loopholes in the existing law. If the existing estate duty operated effectively, the great concentrations of private wealth would already have been broken up and with them many of the unfair advantages enjoyed by generation after generation of the heirs and relatives of wealthy men. In practice, however, the estate duty has always been a largely avoidable, indeed, a voluntary, tax. In particular, it does not bite on transfers of wealth made long enough before death to fall outside the charge.... I therefore propose to introduce this year in my second Finance Bill a tax on lifetime gifts—that is, any transactions containing an element of bounty and including gifts in settlement—which will mesh in with the existing estate duty so as effectively to replace it with a comprehensive tax on all transmissions of personal wealth.

This was implemented with the passage of the Finance Act 1975, which abolished estate duty (Note: but certain deferrals from estate duty still exist, for which technical amendments were made in the Finance Act 2016 to ensure that potential recapture of duty would not be lost in certain circumstances.) and created the capital transfer tax, with the following characteristics:

- It captured all transfers of value, not made at an arm's length basis, by which the transferor's estate was less in value after the disposition than it was before.
- Value was generally defined as "the price which the property might reasonably be expected to fetch in the open market at that time; but that price shall not be assumed to be reduced on the ground that the whole property is to be placed on the market at one and the same time."
- Transfers (in excess of specified limits, or not otherwise excluded) made during a person's lifetime were accumulated with tax assessed on a sliding scale on the total amount.
- All transfers made at death or within three years before were taxable at a separate, higher sliding scale.
- Where the transferor was domiciled in the United Kingdom, tax was chargeable on all subject property; otherwise, it was chargeable only on property situated in the UK.

CTT was reduced in scope during the Thatcher years, with the rates applicable to gifts adjusted to encourage business property to be given during a lifetime, and a ten-year accumulation period introduced to cap the effect of graduated rates.

== Inheritance tax (1986 to present) ==
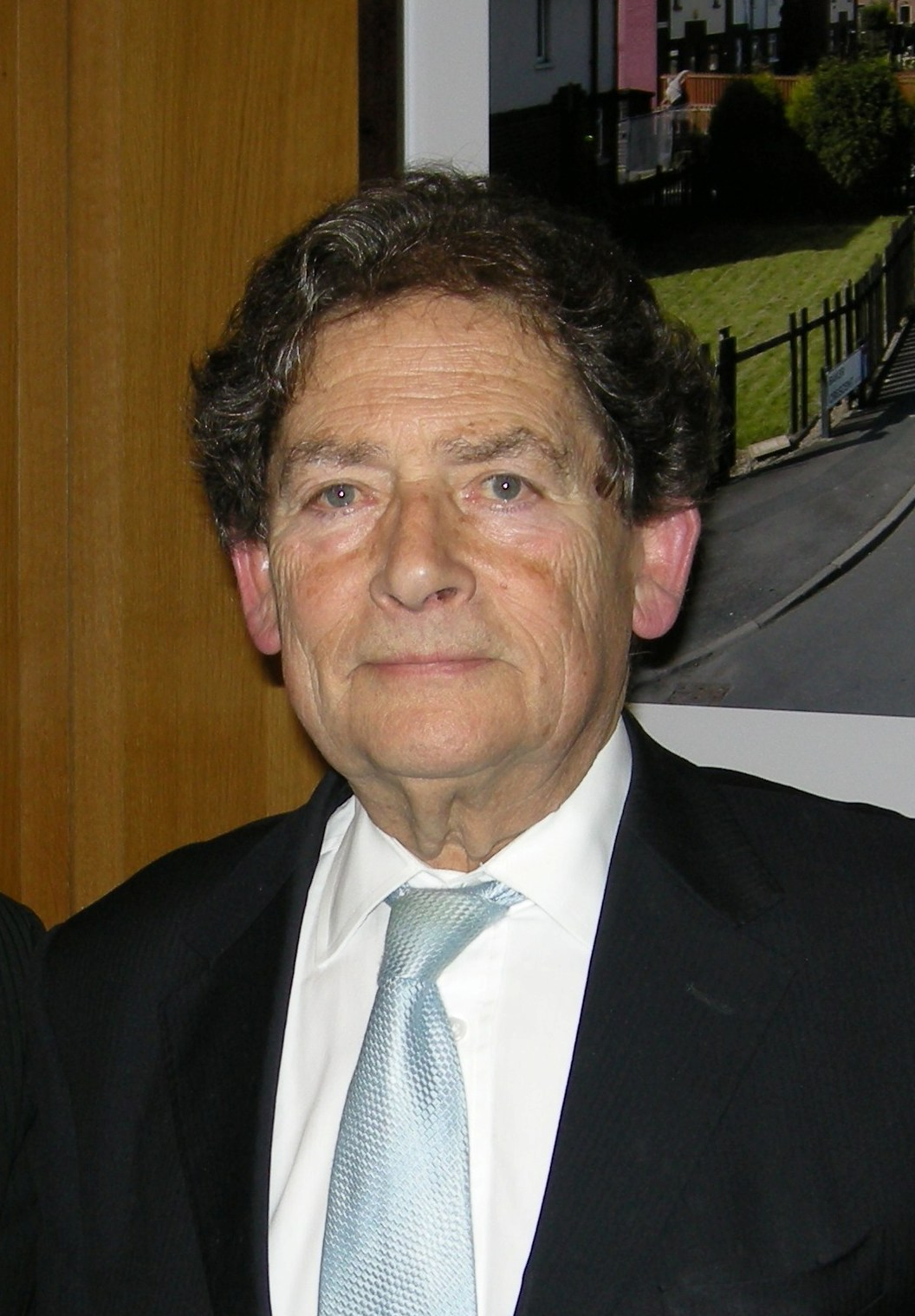
Nigel Lawson arranged to convert capital transfer tax into inheritance tax in 1986

Nigel Lawson, in his 1986 Budget speech, moved to abolish the tax on lifetime gifts altogether, explaining:

My last proposal in this section concerns capital transfer tax which, ever since its introduction by the Labour Government in 1974, has been a thorn in the side of those owning and running family businesses, and as such has had a damaging effect on risk taking and enterprise within a particularly important sector of the economy. In addition to statutory indexation of the threshold and rate bands, I propose this year to reform the tax radically.

In essence, the capital transfer tax is two taxes, as its two separate scales imply: an inheritance tax and a lifetime gifts tax. We have had an inheritance tax in some shape or form ever since Sir William Harcourt introduced his estate duty in 1894. But the lifetime gifts tax which the Labour Government introduced in 1974, in the teeth of united Conservative opposition, is an unwelcome and unwarranted impost. By deterring lifetime giving, it has had the effect of locking in assets, particularly the ownership of family businesses, often to the detriment of the businesses concerned.

Accordingly, I propose to abolish entirely the tax on lifetime gifts to individuals. As with the old estate duty, there will be a tapered charge on gifts made within seven years of death and provisions to charge gifts made with reservation; and the regime for trusts, which is needed as a protection for the death charge, will be kept broadly unchanged.... In recognition of the radically changed nature of the tax, I have decided to rename it the inheritance tax.

This was implemented in the Finance Act 1986.

=== Estate on death ===
For IHT purposes, a person's estate includes:

1. the aggregate of all the property, other than excluded property and specified interests in possession, to which he is beneficially entitled;
2. beneficial entitlement includes the general power to dispose or charge money on any property;
3. except where otherwise provided, the person's liabilities must be taken into account, but it does not include liability with respect to any other tax that may arise on the transfer, and a liability incurred by a transferor shall be taken into account only to the extent that it was incurred for a consideration in money or money's worth.

Excluded property comprises:

1. property situated outside the United Kingdom, where the person beneficially entitled to it is an individual domiciled outside the United Kingdom;
2. decorations and awards granted for valour or gallant conduct, and which have never been the subject of a disposition for a consideration in money or money's worth; and
3. certain specified securities.

Relief is also granted, where the value of the estate is reduced with respect to specified business property, agricultural property, woodlands, certain transfers made within three years of death made at a diminished value, and certain other cases.

=== Chargeable transfers prior to death ===
Deductions will be made from an estate's nil rate band with respect to transfers of value made in excess of specified limits, other than "potentially exempt transfers" made more than seven years before the transferor's death. Transfers of value made within specified limits are known as "exempt transfers".

Transfers of value will also include gifts arising from the amount by which an asset is sold for less than it could have been sold on the open market, as for a sale from a parent to a child. Gifts can also arise where:

- a lease is granted at less than full market rent, shares in a private company are rearranged, rights in such shares are altered, or there has been agreement to act as a guarantor for someone else's debts
- transfers of value, at a loss to the donor, have been made to certain trusts
- premiums have been paid on a life insurance policy for the benefit of someone else
- the deceased ceased to have a right to a benefit from a trust or settlement

Where the value of such transfers exhausts the amount available to the nil rate band, IHT is assessed on the excess amount, to which the recipients of such transfers bear the liability to pay.

=== Rate of tax ===
Tax is assessed at 40% of the net value of the estate, after application of the nil rate band. The applicable nil rate band will depend on the date of death: if the date falls at any time from 6 August to 5 April in a given tax year, the current year's band will apply; but, where the date is after 5 April but before 6 August, and application for a grant is filed before 6 August, the prior year's band will apply.

For deaths occurring after 5 April 2012, the tax is assessed at 36%, where at least 10% of a specified baseline amount of the estate has been bequeathed as charitable gifts. For purposes of calculation, the property of the estate is separated into three components, each of which is tested to see if the charitable gifts are sufficient to qualify for the lesser rate:

- the survivorship component, comprising joint or common property that passes on death by survivorship or special destination;
- the settled property component, made up of all settled property in which the deceased had an interest in possession to which he was beneficially entitled immediately before death; and
- the general component, consisting of all other property in the estate, with the exception of that arising from gifts with reservation.

If applicable gifts meet the 10% threshold for a given component, in certain circumstances, upon election, the 36% rate applies to the whole estate. There are several options available for estates to be able to achieve that threshold, such as having the will specifying relevant gifts in terms of percentages of assets, or successors executing a deed of variation to attain the desired result.

=== Additional nil rate band on main residence ===
In the summer budget of 2015 a new measure was outlined to reduce the burden of IHT for most families by making it easier to pass on the family home to direct descendants without a tax charge. It came into effect upon the passage of the Finance (No. 2) Act 2015, and provided for the following scheduled amounts:

- £100,000 for the 2017-18 tax year
- £125,000 for the 2018-19 tax year
- £150,000 for the 2019-20 tax year
- £175,000 for the 2020-21 tax year
- for subsequent tax years, the amount will be linked to the September–September rise in the consumer price index

The Finance Act 2016 provided further relief in cases where all or part of the additional band could be lost, where a person had downsized to a less valuable residence or had ceased to own a residence after 8 July 2015 (and before the person has died). This is conditional upon the deceased having left that smaller residence, or assets of equivalent value, to direct descendants. These are defined as lineal descendants, spouses or civil partners of such lineal descendants, or former spouses or civil partners who have not become anyone else's spouse or civil partner.

=== Pre-owned assets ===
Effective with the 2005-06 tax year, the Finance Act 2004 introduced a retrospective income tax regime known as pre-owned asset tax (POAT) which covers transactions not made at arm's length, where a person either:

- disposes of a property, or
- contributes funds to another person to acquire a property,

and then subsequently benefits from its use.

The person liable for POAT may, while he is still alive, elect on a timely basis to have such transactions treated as gifts with reservations (thus subject to IHT) with respect to such transactions made in a given tax year.

== Sources ==
- Dowell, Stephen (1884). A History of taxation and taxes in England. Vol. III. London: Longmans, Green and Co.
- Dymond, Robert (1920). The Death Duties (3rd ed.). London: The Solicitors' Law Stationery Society, Limited.
- Freeth, Evelyn; Wallace, Robert J. (1881). Trevor's Taxes on Succession (4th ed.). London: Stevens and Sons.
- HMRC (2015). "Guide to completing your Inheritance Tax account" (PDF). gov.uk.
- Seely, Antony (1995). "Inheritance Tax (Research Paper 95-107)" (PDF). House of Commons Library.

== See also ==
- History of taxation in the United Kingdom
