= History of wealth taxes in Canada =

Inheritance and gift taxes in Canada have a complex history dating back to Canadian Confederation. They are beginning to see a return to prominence in the provincial sphere.

== Provincial succession duties ==
Succession duties have been held to be valid "direct taxation within the province," and can apply in the following scenarios:

1. property of a deceased person, whether he was at the time of his death domiciled in the Province or domiciled elsewhere, situate within the Province passing to any person for any beneficial interest
2. property of a deceased situate outside the Province at the time of the death of the deceased, and the beneficiary of any of the property of the deceased was a resident at the time of the death of the deceased
3. where the deceased person was at the time of his death domiciled in the Province, and where the property of the deceased comprises any personal property situate without the Province in respect of which any beneficial interest passes under the law of the Province to a person who is domiciled or resident in the Province

Succession duties came into effect in the various provinces at the following times:

Province	Introduced	Introductory Act
Ontario	1892	The Succession Duty Act, 1892, S.O. 1892, c. 6
Quebec	1892	An Act respecting duties on successions and on transfers of real estate, S.Q. 1892, c. 18
New Brunswick	1892	The Succession Duty Act, 1892, S.N.B. 1892, c. 6
Nova Scotia	1892	The Succession Duty Act, 1892, S.N.S. 1892, c. 6
Manitoba	1893	The Succession Duties Act, S.M. 1893, c. 31, later consolidated as The Succession Duties Act, R.S.M. 1902, c. 161
Prince Edward Island	1894	
British Columbia	1894	Succession Duty Act, 1894, S.B.C. 1894, c. 47
Saskatchewan	1905	Succession Duty Ordinance, N.W.T.Ord. 1903 (2nd Session), c. 5
Alberta	1905	Succession Duty Ordinance, N.W.T.Ord. 1903 (2nd Session), c. 5
Newfoundland	1914	Death Duties Act, S.N. 1914 (war session), c. 11

Many incidents involving double taxation arose from liability to duty in different provinces, as well as other jurisdictions abroad, which were dealt with inconsistently among the provinces.

=== Collection in Ontario ===
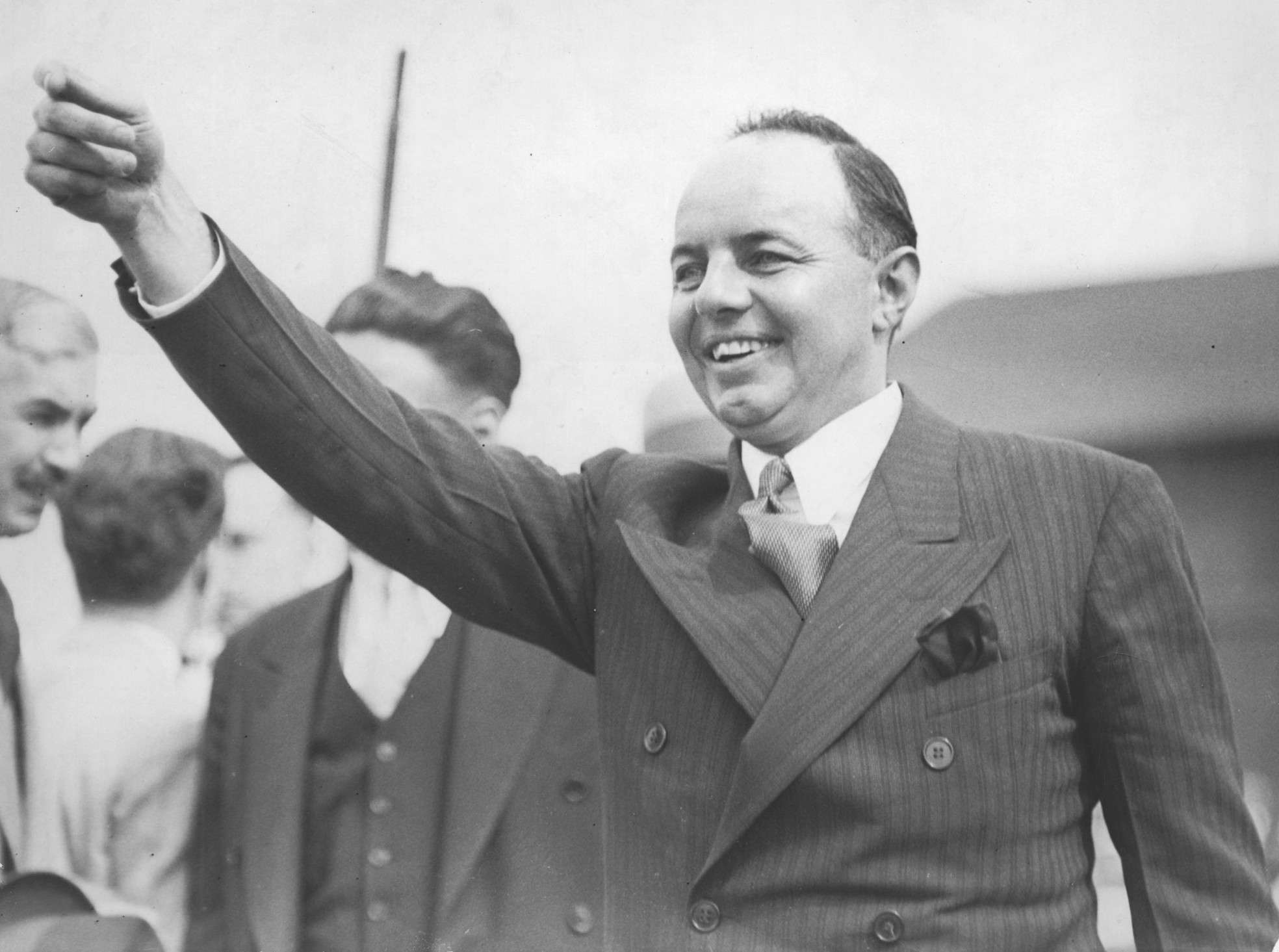
Mitchell Hepburn, Premier and Treasurer of Ontario in the 1930s

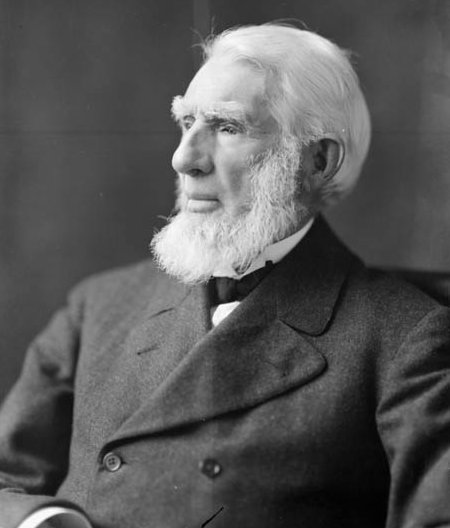
John Rudolphus Booth, whose estate was Hepburn's principal target

Ontario was especially notable in its pursuit of duties. Mitchell Hepburn, in his capacity as Treasurer of Ontario, adopted a more aggressive approach in their collection on large estates, which resulted in millions of dollars in extra government revenues. He made no apologies for doing so, as he noted in a speech in 1938:

That right of succession duties was conferred upon the provinces, and the drive today, emanating from the other provinces is to get control of succession duties and place all collections under the jurisdiction of the Federal Government. If that were to happen, I can tell you, Gentlemen, I would have to impose some new taxes upon you, because I inherited a debt. You know my friend, Howard Ferguson? Bless his heart, he is a great fellow! He is a very astute man. You know he was the luckiest Premier this Province ever had. He blamed the debts which he inherited on his predecessors, he added to them and then handed them on to me. I have to meet the obligations which were handed down to me, and after I sat in his chair in Queen's Park, pinched myself a couple of times and took stock and inventory, I thought of the old adage, "Fools rush in where angels fear to tread," and some of you now who look upon me as the Tax Collector of the Province, probably use language in speaking of my methods of collection which I couldn't repeat before this august and important assembly. That is my responsibility, to meet the obligations of the Province of Ontario, to protect the interests of the Province of Ontario: That is what I am trying to do.

In 1937, legislation was passed that allowed for reexamination of estates for deaths that had occurred back to the beginning of 1916, and also included many gifts inter vivos within the duty's scope. Hepburn consequently ordered that all files relating to estates worth $500,000 or more, together with those of smaller estates where evasion was suspected, were to be reopened, with the expectation of raising further duties anywhere from $70 million to $100 million. The collection tactics employed included the seizure of books and records without a warrant, different methods for valuing assets, and the assessment of penalties that could amount to double or triple the amount of the duty involved.

One estate of particular focus in this campaign was that of the late John Rudolphus Booth, who had died in 1925. Although succession duties of $4.28 million were paid in 1927, Hepburn subsequently claimed more in 1937. Booth's heirs eventually paid another $3 million in 1939.

=== Where succession duty could apply ===
Duty cannot be charged where property is left outside the province to beneficiaries who are neither resident nor domiciled in the province. Taken as a whole, chargeability to succession duty depended upon whether the donor's domicile, the donee's residence, as well as the donee's status at the date of the deceased's death and the date of the disposition of the estate. In 1967, Ontario published a table outlining the various effects:

Treatment of dispositions under the Succession Duty Act (Ontario)
Property at date of death	Deceased domiciled in Ontario						Deceased not domiciled in Ontario at death		
Property at date of death	At date of death and at date of disposition			At date of death only			Deceased not domiciled in Ontario at death		
Property at date of death	Donee			Donee			Donee		
Property at date of death	Resident in Ontario at both dates	Resident at date of death only	Not resident in Ontario at death	Resident in Ontario at both dates	Resident at date of death only	Not resident in Ontario at death	Resident in Ontario at both dates	Resident at date of death only	Not resident in Ontario at death
Real property in Ontario	✓	✓	✓	✓	✓	✓	✓	✓	✓
Personal property in Ontario (disposition made in Ontario)	✓	✓	✓	✓	✓	✓	✓	✓	✓
Personal property in Ontario (disposition made outside Ontario)	✓	✓	✓	✗	✗	✗	✗	✗	✗
Personal property outside Ontario (disposition made in Ontario)	✓	✓	✗	✓	✓	✗	✓	✓	✗
Personal property outside Ontario (disposition made outside Ontario)	✓	✗	✗	✗	✗	✗	✗	✗	✗
Real property outside Ontario	✗	✗	✗	✗	✗	✗	✗	✗	✗

== Federal estate taxes ==
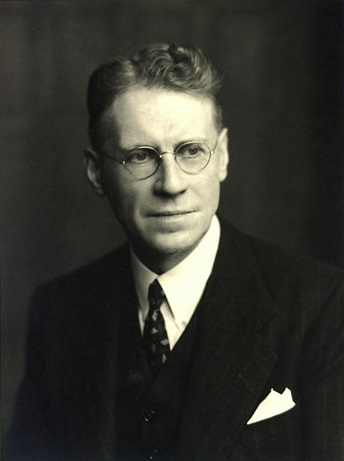
James Lorimer Ilsley, Minister of Finance in 1941

Death taxes, which were not subject to the territorial limitations that affected provincial taxation, were first introduced at the federal level under the Dominion Succession Duty Act passed in 1941.(French: Loi fédérale sur les droits successoraux) in 1941, In his Budget speech that year, Minister of Finance James Lorimer Ilsley explained why the federal government was entering in this area of revenue:

Death duties, in general, are a very good type of tax, second only to income tax in their essential fairness and the possibilities of adjusting them progressively to ability to pay. They are even better than income tax in so far as they do not have as much tendency to reduce an individual's incentive to hard work and initiative. It is reasonable and just that one should be able to provide something for his wife and children, and others, after his death. It is also reasonable and just, however, that the state should share in what one leaves, at a rate dependent upon the amount of wealth being transferred. Indeed, I find this view so generally held in this country that it is not necessary to do more than call it to mind.

It was later replaced by the Estate Tax Act (French: Loi de l'impôt sur les biens transmis par décès) in 1958, which was repealed at the end of 1971.

The succession duty focused on the succession being transferred, as opposed to the estate itself, which made it similar in scope to the UK's Succession Duty Act 1853. The estate tax, in comparison, was modelled more along the line of the US estate tax.

At the introduction of each tax, the property that was subject to each was identified as follows:

Property	Succession duty	Estate tax
every succession, being every past or future disposition of property by which another person obtains the beneficial interest in property or the income thereof, either immediately or after any interval, certainly or contingently, originally or by way of substantive limitation, including those operating by devolution of law	✓	
all of which the deceased was competent to dispose, immediately prior to death	✓	✓
disposed as a donatio mortis causa	✓	✓
disposed as an immediate gift inter vivos	✓	✓
taken as a gift, whenever made, with reservation of benefits	✓	
disposed within three years preceding death, either to a trust or as a gift		✓
comprised in a settlement, whenever made	✓	✓
held jointly with one or more other persons, to the extent of the beneficial interest therein	✓	✓
disposed within three years preceding death for partial consideration		✓
disposed under an arrangement with another person (other than a financial institution) to purchase an annuity, whether for life or for any other period in reference to death		✓
disposed at less than fair market value at any time		✓
any annuity or other interest, to the extent that the beneficial interest passes by survivorship or otherwise upon death of the deceased	✓	✓
any superannuation, pension or death benefit that arises on or after death of the deceased		✓
disposed of by any person on or after death of the deceased, whether voluntarily in recognition of employment service, or otherwise under any other agreement		✓
any amount payable under a life insurance policy, whether held (either alone, jointly or in common) by the deceased, or a trust or corporation controlled by the deceased	✓	✓
transferred to or settled upon any person, within three years preceding death, in consideration of marriage	✓	✓
agreed to be transferred to or settled upon any person, within three years preceding death, in consideration of marriage, to the extent that it was actually transferred or settled		✓
that is the subject matter of a transfer, agreement or settlement made at any time in consideration of marriage, where any interest for life or otherwise is reserved either expressly or by implication to the deceased		✓
any estate in dower or curtesy	✓	✓
any disposition within three years preceding death in consideration of the release of any right in dower or curtesy		✓

== Gift tax ==
Gift tax was introduced as part of R.B. Bennett's New Deal in 1935. It was framed as an antiavoidance measure, as explained by Edgar Nelson Rhodes in that year's Budget speech:

This form of tax, adopted by many countries, is being imposed primarily to operate as a deterrent to transfers of property as a gift, chiefly within family groups which would have the effect of reducing personal income to lower brackets and thus securing income tax assessments at rates lower than would otherwise be applicable. It is particularly expedient to introduce this measure at this time in view of the higher rates of taxation provided for in the new surtax on investment income. Not only should this tax put our income tax structure on a more secure foundation but it should operate in a like manner with regard to succession and inheritance taxes levied by the provinces.

As a consequence, it was imposed by the Parliament of Canada later that year as part of the Income War Tax Act.

The tax was wide in its scope:

- it applied to any property (whether situated inside or outside Canada) transferred by way of gift or donation
- it applied "whether the transfer is in trust or otherwise, or direct or indirect, or whether the property is real or personal, tangible or intangible, and shall extend to gifts made by personal corporations"
- several classes of gifts or donations were exempt from tax: those in any year that totalled $4000 or less; those taking effect upon death; those made to charitable or educational institutions, Canada or any province, and certain ones not recognized for income tax purposes (Note: the last class of exempt gifts was repealed in 1941)
- where a gift is made to a minor aged 13 to 18 years, liability for tax will not arise until the 19th birthday, provided that the donor has supplied a bond securing the payment of the tax (Note: repealed in 1941)
- the donor is liable to pay the tax, otherwise there is joint and several liability by both the donor and donee

== Post-war involvement in revenues ==
=== Federal-provincial revenue-sharing arrangements (1947-1971) ===
From 1947 to 1971, there was a complicated set of federal-provincial revenue-sharing arrangements, where:

- In Newfoundland, Prince Edward Island, Nova Scotia, New Brunswick and Manitoba, the federal government collected estate taxes at full rates, but remitted 75% of the revenues derived from each of those provinces;
- In Alberta and Saskatchewan, the federal government collected estate taxes at full rates, but remitted 75% of the revenues derived from each of those provinces, which was rebated back to the estate;
- In British Columbia, the federal government collected estate taxes at only 25% of the full rate, and the province continued to levy its own succession duty;
- In Ontario and Quebec, the federal government collected estate taxes at only 50% of the full rate, and remitted 50% of such collections to such provinces, and the provinces continued to levy their own succession duties.

When Edgar Benson's white paper on tax reform was issued in 1969, his original intention was to retain estate and gift taxes in conjunction with introducing capital gains tax, with appropriate relief to avoid double taxation. After public consultations were held through hearings by parliamentary committees, he announced that, as "it is no longer possible to establish a uniform national system of death duties through federal legislation," the federal government would vacate the estate and gift tax field on December 31, 1971. At that time, only British Columbia, Ontario and Quebec were still levying duties of their own. Most of the other provinces revived their succession duties, and also started levying gift taxes, on January 1, 1972.

=== Provincial succession duties (after 1971) ===
Succession duties continued until the following dates:

Province	Repeal	Repealing Act
New Brunswick	1974	S.N.B. 1991, c.6
Nova Scotia	1974	An Act to Amend Chapter 17 of the Acts of 1972, An Act respecting Succession Duties, S.N.S. 1974, c. 30
Newfoundland	1974	The Succession Duty (Repeal) Act, 1974, S.N. 1974, c. 76
Manitoba	1977	The Succession Duty Act, S.M. 1988-89, c. 42, s. 78
British Columbia	1977	The Succession Duty Repeal Act, 1977, S.B.C. 1977, c. 20
Saskatchewan	1977	The Regulatory Reform Act, 1992, S.S. 1992, c. 11
Ontario	1979	The Succession Duty Repeal Act, 1979, S.O. 1979, c. 20
Ontario	1979	Succession Duty Legislation Repeal Act, 2009, as enacted by the Ontario Tax Plan for More Jobs and Growth Act, 2009, S.O. 2009, c. 34, Sch. T
Quebec	1985	An Act to amend various fiscal laws and other legislation, S.Q. 1986, c. 15, s. 4

These taxes were seen to have died out because of their relative unattractiveness, as noted by Peter Hogg:

1. effective legislation is difficult to draft
2. its complexity makes the taxes costly to administer, relative to the amounts raised
3. the taxes lead to an avoidance industry, often including shifting assets out of the province

=== Provincial gift tax (after 1971) ===
Gift taxes were levied until the following dates:

Province		Repeal	Repealing Act
New Brunswick	Gift Tax Act, 1972, S.N.B. 1972, c.9	January 1, 1974	S.N.B. 1991, c.5
Nova Scotia	An Act to Provide for Gift Tax, S.N.S. 1972, c. 9	April 1, 1974	An Act to Amend Chapter 9 of the Acts of 1972, An Act to Provide for Gift Tax, S.N. 1974, c. 75
Newfoundland	The Gift Tax Act, 1972, S.N. 1972, c. 39	April 9, 1974	The Gift Tax (Repeal) Act, 1974, S.N. 1974, c. 75
Saskatchewan	The Gift Tax Act, 1972, S.S. 1972 c. 48	January 1, 1977	The Gift Tax Repeal Act, 1972, S.S. 1976-77, c. 27
British Columbia	The Gift Tax Act, 1972, S.B.C. 1972 c. 23	January 24, 1977	The Gift Tax Repeal Act, 1977, S.B.C. 1977 c. 15
Manitoba	The Gift Tax Act, S.M. 1972, c. 10	October 11, 1977	An Act to Amend The Gift Tax Act (Manitoba) and The Succession Duty Act (Manitoba), S.M. 1977 (2nd session), c. 2
Ontario	The Gift Tax Act, 1972, S.O. 1972, c. 12	April 11, 1979	The Gift Tax Repeal Act, 1979, S.O. 1979, c. 21
Quebec	Taxation Act, S.Q. 1972, c. 23, Part VIII	April 23, 1985	An Act to amend various fiscal laws and other legislation, S.Q. 1986, c. 15, s. 208

== Conversion to deemed dispositions for capital gains tax (after 1971) ==
Upon the repeal of the federal estate and gift taxes on January 1, 1972, the income tax régime was altered to provide for a capital gains tax, which included liability arising from the "deemed disposition" of assets. Liability will arise from gifts from, and the death of, the taxpayer, as well in the following circumstances:

- the use of a property has changed
- the taxpayer emigrates from Canada
- a trust for a taxpayer's spouse or common-law partner, when that beneficiary dies, or on the 21st anniversary of a trust

== Recent conversion of provincial probate fees into probate taxes ==
The provinces have moved in recent years to convert fees for the granting of letters probate and letters of administration from flat rates to ones based on the value of the estate. In 1992, Ontario introduced fees at a level higher than in any other province. The Supreme Court of Canada declared that the method by which it was introduced was unconstitutional, as its basis had not been the subject of appropriate legislation.

As a result, the provinces (Note: with the exception of Quebec, which never had such a regime) passed legislation to legitimate the fees already in effect:

Province	Retrospective legislation	Retroactive to
Ontario	Estate Administration Tax Act, 1998, S.O. 1998, c. 34, Schedule	May 15, 1950
Manitoba	The Law Fees Amendment and Consequential, S.M. 1999, c. 11	August 6, 1959
Nova Scotia	An Act to Amend Chapter 104 of the Revised Statutes, 1989, the Costs and Fees Act, and Chapter 359 of the Revised Statutes, 1989, the Probate Act, S.N.S. 1999 (2nd session), c. 1	October 1, 1982
British Columbia	Probate Fee Act, S.B.C. 1999, c. 4	April 1, 1988
Newfoundland	Services Charges Act, S.N. 1998, c. S-13.2, s. 6	Whenever the charge was made
Alberta	Government Fees and Charges Review Act, S.A. 1999, c. G8, s. 2	Whenever the charge was made
Prince Edward Island	An Act to Amend the Personal Property Security Act, the Probate Act and the Registry Act, S.P.E.I. 1999 (2nd session), c. 17, s. 2	Whenever the charge was made
New Brunswick	Probate Court Act, S.N.B. c. P-17.1, s. 75.1, as inserted by S.N.B. 1999, c. 29, s. 5	
Saskatchewan	The Administration of Estates Amendment Act, 1999, S.S. 1999, c. 2	

=== Expansion of scope in Ontario (2015) ===
Ontario already had the highest rates relating to probate taxes, but is still faced with large budget deficits. The provincial 2011 budget speech stated that there was still a compliance problem with respect to the Estate Administration Tax, and it accordingly passed amending legislation that year, coming into effect on January 1, 2015, which provided for the following changes:

- in addition to the requirement to pay a deposit on tax that was already in place in order to receive an estate certificate, (Note: a term that covers letters probate and letters of administration) an estate representative must file an estate information return within 90 days of the date the certificate was issued, together with any balance of tax still owing
- where a later statement under the Estates Act discloses any property that was not previously disclosed on the estate information return, the estate representative must file an amended return within 30 days of the statement date
- the Minister of Finance has similar powers to examine the information as he has under the Retail Sales Tax Act
- there is no procedure for the estate to receive a clearance certificate with respect to closing off any further liability

The changes have been viewed as "put[ting] undue pressure on executors—often family members—faced with balancing their grief with trying to make the Finance Ministry happy."

== Sources ==
- Bale, Gordon (1972). "Wills and Estate Planning". Ottawa Law Review. 5 (2): 555–582.
- Benson, E.J. (1969). Proposals for tax reform (PDF). Ottawa: Queen's Printer for Canada.
- Benson, E.J. (1971). Summary of 1971 Tax Reform Legislation (PDF). Ottawa: Queen's Printer for Canada.
- Goodman, Wolfe D. (1995). "Death Taxes in Canada, in the Past and in the Possible Future" (PDF). Canadian Tax Journal. 43 (5). Canadian Tax Foundation: 1360–1376.
- LeBreux, Paul (1999). "Eurig Estate: Another Day, Another Tax" (PDF). Canadian Tax Journal. 47 (5): 1126–1163.
- Pozer, David (1959). "The New Estate Tax". Osgoode Hall Law Journal. 1 (2): 90–94. doi:10.60082/2817-5069.2533.
- Smith, Lancelot J. (1967). "28. The Taxation of Wealth: Death and Gift Taxes". Report of the Ontario Committee on Taxation. Vol. III. pp. 131–208.
