= Land Tax (England) =

Tax levied from 1689 to 1963

The Land Tax was a land value tax levied in England from 1670 to 1963: perhaps the best-known of these is the Land Tax Act 1692 (4 Will. & Mar. c. 1). Land taxes were abolished by the Finance Act 1963. Taxes on land date back to the Norman Conquest and beyond, and the Land Tax introduced in 1692 was a natural successor to taxation acts in 1671 and 1689, but the Land Tax Act 1692 "has been regarded as a turning point in the history of English revenue collection. It was from this act that contemporaries and historians alike date what has come to be known as the eighteenth-century Land Tax". The land tax elements of the 1671, 1689 and 1692 acts were limited to one year but the 1798 act made the tax perpetual (until it was abolished in 1963).

A Land Tax had also applied in Scotland from 1667. After the Acts of Union 1707, the Scottish charge was included in subsequent acts of the Parliament of Great Britain.

== Subsidy Act 1670/71 (22 & 23 Cha. 2. c. 3) ==
Subsidy Act 1670
- Act of Parliament
- Parliament of England
- Long title: An Act for granting a Subsidy to his Majestie for Supply of his Extraordinary Occasions.
- Citation: 22 & 23 Cha. 2. c. 3
- Territorial extent: England and Wales

Dates
- Royal assent: 6 March 1671
- Commencement: 24 October 1670 (Note: Start of session.)
- Repealed: 28 July 1863
Other legislation
Repealed by	Statute Law Revision Act 1863

Status: Repealed

Text of statute as originally enacted

The Subsidy Act 1670 (22 & 23 Cha. 2. c. 3), "An Act for granting a Subsidy to his Majestie for Supply of his Extraordinary Occasions", was enacted in the reign of Charles II. This act was described by Cecil Chandaman as "the product of the hardest and most constructive thinking by the Commons on the subject of direct taxation during the Restoration period". Beckett calls it "an attempt to resurrect and renovate the basic principle of the old subsidy which national wealth would be assessed at a pound rate", and thus the precursor of the 1689 and 1692 acts. Among the many revenue-raising elements, section IX specifies that "Lands, Mines, &c. to pay 12d. in the Pound of the yearly Value for one Year". (Note: The phrase "yearly value" means the actual or notional annual rent that could be obtained on the open market for the asset concerned, whether actually let or not. "12d in the pound" means 12/240 or 5%.)

== Land Tax Act 1688 (1 Will. & Mar. c. 20) ==
Land Tax Act 1688
- Act of Parliament
- Parliament of England
- Long title: An Act for a Grant to Their Majestyes of an Ayde of Twelve pence in the Pound for One Yeare for the necessary Defence of Their Realmes.
- Citation: 1 Will. & Mar. c. 20 (Note: This is the citation in The Statutes of the Realm.); 1 Will. & Mar. Sess. 1. c. 20 (Note: This is the citation in The Statutes at Large.)
- Territorial extent: England and Wales

Dates
- Royal assent: 22 June 1689
- Commencement: 13 February 1689 (Note: Start of session.)
- Repealed: 15 July 1867
Other legislation
Repealed by	Statute Law Revision Act 1867
Relates to	Land Tax (Commissioners) Act 1688

Status: Repealed

Text of statute as originally enacted

Land Tax (Commissioners) Act 1688
- Act of Parliament
- Parliament of England
- Long title: An Additionall Act for the Appointing Commissioners for the Executing an Act of this present Parliament Entituled An Act for a Grant to their Majestyes of an Ayde of Twelve Pence in the Pound for One Yeare for the necessary Defence of their Realmes.
- Citation: 1 Will. & Mar. c. 31; 1 Will. & Mar. Sess. 1. c. 31
- Territorial extent: England and Wales

Dates
- Royal assent: 20 August 1689
- Commencement: 13 February 1689 (Note: Start of session.)
- Repealed: 15 July 1867
Other legislation
Repealed by	Statute Law Revision Act 1867
Relates to	Land Tax Act 1689

Status: Repealed

Text of statute as originally enacted

Land Tax Act 1691
- Act of Parliament
- Parliament of England
- Long title: An Act for Granting an Aid to Their Majesties of the Summe of Sixteene hundred fifty one thousand seven hundred and two pounds eighteen shillings towards the Carrying on a Vigorous Warre against France.
- Citation: 3 Will. & Mar. c. 5
- Territorial extent: England and Wales

Dates
- Royal assent: 31 December 1691
- Commencement: 25 December 1691 (Note: Section 1.)
- Repealed: 15 July 1867
Other legislation
Repealed by	Statute Law Revision Act 1867

Status: Repealed

Text of statute as originally enacted

CAP XX An act for a grant to their Majesties of an aid of twelve pence in the pound for one year for the necessary of defence of their realms.

... shall pay unto their Majesties the sum of twelve pence for twenty shillings by the year which the said manors messuages lands tenements hereditaments and other the premisses now worth to be leased if the same were truly and bona fide or leased at a rack rent and according to the full true value thereof without any respect had to the present rents reserved for the same if such rents have been reserved upon such leases or estates made for which any fine or income hath been paid or secured and without any respect had to any former rates or taxes thereupon imposed:

— 1 Will. & Mary c 20, 1689.

The Land Tax Act 1688 (1 Will. & Mar. c. 20) aimed to capture income from all sources: business, employment and land (the main source of wealth in the seventeenth century and for many years afterwards). In a sense, it was a general income tax, although income was not itself assessed. The state lacked the administrative machinery to measure actual income. Instead, income was calculated indirectly by reference to the deemed yield from the capital value of assets, to which was applied a rate of twelve pence (one shilling) in the pound (5%). However, despite this, it soon proved impracticable to collect much tax from business and employment, and the main yield of the tax came from the charges on land. Hence before long, the tax came to be called the Land Tax, and the annual Land Tax acts used this name. The business and employment charges lingered on, and were repealed by 1877.

The charge on land in 1689 depended on a valuation of all property throughout the country to find its open market rental value. That value was the income subject to the tax. Because, no doubt, of the difficulty and expense of valuation, the same values were used in subsequent years. As time passed the original valuation become increasingly unrealistic and, moreover, the relative value of property in different areas changed, especially as the Industrial Revolution got underway. Poor land in places that became major powerhouses increased hugely in value. Surprisingly, however, there was never another valuation in the entire 271-year history of Land Tax, even though it was re-enacted annually until 1798, when it was made permanent. Naturally, there were many complaints over the years about the unfair incidence of the tax, but MPs for the lightly taxed areas resisted reform.

== Land Tax Act 1692 (4 Will. & Mar c. 1) ==
Land Tax Act 1692
- Act of Parliament
- Parliament of England
- Long title: An Act for granting to their Majesties an Aid of four shillings in the pound for one year, for carrying on a vigorous war against France.
- Citation: 4 Will. & Mar. c. 1
- Territorial extent: England and Wales

Dates
- Royal assent: 20 January 1693
- Commencement: 4 November 1692 (Note: Start of session.)
- Repealed: 15 July 1867
Other legislation
Repealed by	Statute Law Revision Act 1867

Status: Repealed

Text of statute as originally enacted

Land Tax Act 1693
- Act of Parliament
- Parliament of England
- Long title: An Act for granting to Their Majesties an Aid of Foure Shillings in the Pound, for One yeare, for carrying on a vigorous War against France.
- Citation: 5 Will. & Mar. c. 1
- Territorial extent: England and Wales

Dates
- Royal assent: 25 January 1694
- Commencement: 7 November 1693 (Note: Start of session.)
- Repealed: 15 July 1867
Other legislation
Repealed by	Statute Law Revision Act 1867

Status: Repealed

Text of statute as originally enacted

The Land Tax Act 1692 (4 Will. & Mar. c. 1) is introduced simply as "an Act for granting to their Majesties an Aid of four shillings in the pound for one year, for carrying on a vigorous war against France", but subsequently became known as one of the Land Tax Acts. (Four shillings in the pound equates to 20% of imputed income based on the value of the asset.)

== Land Tax Act 1697 (8 & 9 Will. 3. c. 6) ==
Land Tax Act 1696
- Act of Parliament
- Parliament of England
- Long title: An Act for granting an Aid to His Majesty as well by a Land Tax as by several Subsidies and other Duties payable for One Yeare.
- Citation: 8 & 9 Will. 3. c. 6
- Territorial extent: England and Wales

Dates
- Royal assent: 29 January 1697
- Commencement: 25 December 1696
- Repealed: 15 July 1867
Other legislation
Repealed by	Statute Law Revision Act 1867

Status: Repealed

Text of statute as originally enacted

Land Tax Act 1698
- Act of Parliament
- Parliament of England
- Long title: An Act for granting to His Majesty the Summ of One Million four hundred eighty four thousand and fifteene one Shilling eleaven Pence three Farthings for disbanding the Army providing for the Navy and for other necessary Occasions.
- Citation: 10 Will. 3. c. 9; 10 & 11 Will. 3. c. 9
- Territorial extent: England and Wales

Dates
- Royal assent: 4 May 1699
- Commencement: 15 February 1698
- Repealed: 15 July 1867
Other legislation
Repealed by	Statute Law Revision Act 1867

Status: Repealed

Text of statute as originally enacted

Land Tax Act 1710
- Act of Parliament
- Parliament of Great Britain
- Long title: An Act for granting an Aid to Her Majesty, to be raised by a Land Tax in Great Britain, for the Service of the Year One Thousand Seven Hundred and Eleven.
- Citation: 9 Ann. c. 1
- Territorial extent: Great Britain

Dates
- Royal assent: 23 December 1710
- Commencement: 25 March 1711 (Note: Section 2.)
- Repealed: 15 July 1867
Other legislation
Repealed by	Statute Law Revision Act 1867

Status: Repealed

Text of statute as originally enacted

Land Tax Act 1711
- Act of Parliament
- Parliament of Great Britain
- Long title: An Act for granting an Aid to Her Majesty, to be raised by a Land Tax in Great Britain, for the Service of the Year One Thousand Seven Hundred and Twelve.
- Citation: 10 Ann. c. 1
- Territorial extent: Great Britain

Dates
- Royal assent: 22 December 1711
- Commencement: 25 March 1712 (Note: Section 1.)
- Repealed: 15 July 1867
Other legislation
Repealed by	Statute Law Revision Act 1867

Status: Repealed

Text of statute as originally enacted

Land Tax Act 1720
- Act of Parliament
- Parliament of Great Britain
- Long title: An Act for granting an Aid to His Majesty, by a Land Tax, to be raised in Great Britain, for the Service of the Year One Thousand Seven Hundred Twenty-one.
- Citation: 7 Geo. 1. St. 1. c. 4
- Territorial extent: Great Britain

Dates
- Royal assent: 11 February 1721
- Commencement: 25 March 1721
- Repealed: 15 July 1867
Other legislation
Repealed by	Statute Law Revision Act 1867

Status: Repealed

Text of statute as originally enacted

The Land Tax Act 1696 (8 & 9 Will. 3. c. 6), "'An Act for granting an Aid to His Majesty as well by a Land Tax as by several Subsidies and other Duties payable for One Yeare", the third of the 17th century Land Tax Acts, is the first to say so explicitly in its title. Despite the act levying a poll tax, income taxes and a variety of other taxes in addition to the land tax, the tax raised just 87% of the 1693 yield. In the Land Tax Act 1696, Land Tax became a quota tax. That is, after several years of falling yields, the government decided to abandon the attempt to measure assets. Instead, they raised a set sum from England and Wales based on the yield from the Land Tax Act 1692 (4 Will. & Mar. c. 1). That act imposed a tax at four shillings in the pound and raised about £2 million (about £414 million today). (Note: Inflation estimates are based on retail prices or average wages rather than the UK's Gross Domestic Product, which might be more appropriate but data are not available for this period.) The quota acts subsequently raised one of four sums depending on the budgetary requirements of the year: £2 million, £1.5 million, £1 million or £0.5 million using nominal rates of four shillings, three shillings, two shillings and one shilling. The rates were nominal because they were not used to calculate the annual amount. By the end of the eighteenth century, four shillings had become the usual rate.

The quota acts divided the total for England and Wales between towns and counties using the 1689 valuations, which were never revised. Land Tax acts thereafter listed each town and county by name together with the amount of quota due. The amounts due from each place only changed in proportion to the fixed sum for the whole country. For example, if the rate was four shillings a place might have to pay £10,000 out of the £2 million total. If the rate was two shillings, the total for the country became £1 million, and the place would have to pay £5,000. Unpaid local worthies were appointed by the acts to run the tax, and they split the total for their area down to parishes and individual properties in proportion to the 1689 valuations. Usually, the commissioners carried the same valuation for each property forward from one year to the next. After the Acts of Union 1707, the annual Land Tax Act also included a fixed sum for Scotland.

== Land Tax Perpetuation Act 1798 (Great Britain) ==
Land Tax Perpetuation Act 1798 (Note: The citation of this act by this short title was authorised by section 1 of, and the first schedule to, the Short Titles Act 1896. Due to the repeal of those provisions it is now authorised by section 19(2) of the Interpretation Act 1978.)
- Act of Parliament
- Parliament of Great Britain
- Long title: An Act for making perpetual, subject to Redemption and Purchase in the Manner therein stated, the several Sums of Money now charged in Great Britain as a Land Tax for One Tear from the Twenty-fifth day of March One thousand seven hundred and ninety-eight.
- Citation: 38 Geo. 3. c. 60
- Territorial extent: Great Britain

Dates
- Royal assent: 21 June 1798
- Commencement: 25 March 1798
- Repealed: 30 July 1949
Other legislation
Amended by	Land Tax Redemption (No. 2) Act 1799; Land Tax Redemption (No. 2) Act 1800; Land Tax Redemption Act 1802; Statute Law Revision Act 1888
Repealed by	Finance Act 1949

Status: Repealed

Text of statute as originally enacted

Nor was there a new valuation when the Land Tax Perpetuation Act 1798 (38 Geo. 3. c. 60) made the Land Tax permanent, although some MPs complained that the government was setting historic injustices in stone. Prime Minister William Pitt resisted a new valuation on the grounds that the 1692 figures had been used for over 100 years despite the annual opportunity for reevaluation when the tax was re-imposed. Parliament had had plenty of chances to reform, and had been content to continue the old system; so there was no reason to change now. In the midst of war, Pitt probably had no time to undertake a new valuation.

Land Tax was made permanent because Pitt devised a scheme to offer property owners the option to buy out ('redeem') future Land Tax by paying a lump sum. The government gave up its future stream of tax for an immediate capital payment. It was necessary for Land Tax to be converted from an annual tax into a permanent tax so there would be a permanent obligation that could be bought and sold. (Otherwise, property owners would be unlikely to pay a large lump sum to redeem a tax which might not be re-imposed in the future.) The scheme was a reasonable success. The annual Land Tax yield was then about £2 million (say £222 million today) and about a quarter was redeemed by the end of 1800, producing just over £9 million (say £652 million today) for the government. Over the next 50 years, only an additional £400,000 of Land Tax was redeemed, despite attempts to make the option more attractive. After 1800, the value of Land Tax to the government continued to decline, partly because of redemption and partly because of inflation.

The Land Tax Redemption Act 1802 (42 Geo. 3. c. 116) consolidated enactments relating to the redemption and sale of land tax.

For most of the eighteenth century, the bulk of government revenue came from customs and excise—taxes on everyday goods such as salt, candles, leather, beer, soap and starch, as well as luxury goods like wine, brandy, silks, gold and silver thread, silver plate, horses, coaches and hats. In the middle of the eighteenth century, the Land Tax accounted for about 15% of the total tax revenue.

Land Tax Commissioners Act 1821
- Act of Parliament
- Parliament of the United Kingdom
- Long title: An act for appointing Commissioners for carrying into Execution an Act or this Session of Parliament, for granting to His Majesty a Duty on Pensions and Offices in England; and an Act, made in the Thirty eighth Year of His late Majesty, for granting an Aid to His Majesty by a Land Tax to be raised in Great Britain, for the Service of the Year One thousand seven hundred and ninety eight.
- Citation: 1 & 2 Geo. 4. c. 123
- Territorial extent: United Kingdom

Dates
- Royal assent: 2 July 1821
- Commencement: 2 July 1821 (Note: The Acts of Parliament (Commencement) Act 1793.)
- Repealed: 5 August 1873
Other legislation
Amends	Land Tax Act 1797; Duties on Malt, etc. Act 1821
Repealed by	Statute Law Revision Act 1873

Status: Repealed

Text of statute as originally enacted

Until the mid-19th century the land tax commissioners were local property owners acting without remuneration. Latterly they also had responsibility for collecting the Duty on Pensions, Offices, and Personal Estates. Periodically an act was passed listed all the names of the commissioners to be appointed, grouped by the area within which they had authority. The longest act enrolled in the Parliamentary Archives is the Land Tax Commissioners Act 1821 (1 & 2 Geo. 4. c. 123) which names about 65,000 land tax commissioners; it comprises 757 vellum membranes of sheepskin 348 metres (1,142 ft) long. It has been displayed, rolled up, in exhibitions in the Westminster Royal Gallery in 2004, and the People's History Museum in 2021.

== See also ==
- History of taxation in the United Kingdom
