= Quick succession relief =

Quick succession relief in the United Kingdom applies where there are two charges of Inheritance tax within five years. This acts as a tax shelter. This is governed by the IHTA.

Inheritance tax is normally chargeable on the death estate when an individual dies. The death estate is the sum of assets less allowable debts and funeral expenses. Allowable debts are those incurred for full consideration and those imposed by law, such as taxes.

Both the substantial law and calculation are somewhat difficult.

== Calculation ==
Quick succession relief is calculated as:

Tax paid on first transfer x net transfer
gross transfer x relevant %

The net transfer is the amount actually received by the transferee after the inheritance tax. The gross transfer is the amount chargeable to the inheritance tax. The relevant % relates to the period of time between the first transfer and the date of death:

Relief %
One year or less = 100%
One year but less than two years = 80%
Two years but less than three years = 60%
Three years but less than four years = 40%
Four years but less than five years = 20%
