= Disclaimer of interest =

Legal concept

In the law of inheritance, wills and trusts, a disclaimer of interest (also called a renunciation) is an attempt by a person to renounce their legal right to benefit from an inheritance (either under a will or through intestacy) or through a trust. "If a trustee disclaims an interest in property that otherwise would have become trust property, the interest does not become trust property."

There are a number of reasons why a person might wish to avoid an inheritance, particularly if the proceeds would only go to their creditors, or if it would drastically affect their income tax liabilities. Under the common law, a person who disclaimed their interest would be treated as though they had died before the trust or will came into effect. This was a sensible option if the disclaiming party was an heir by descent, whose own children would then take in his place and without the imposition of a gift tax.

The disclaimer must be in writing and submitted to the court overseeing the disposition of the estate within a legally specified time period, which is usually nine months after the death of the person from whom the disclaiming party stands to inherit, or twelve months after the creation of a trust by a living person. An affidavit may be required in which the disclaiming party must swear that he has not received any consideration (i.e., compensation) for the disclaimer. The disclaimer must also occur before the disclaiming party has enjoyed any benefits of the trust or inheritance. Many jurisdictions now have statutes that prohibit a disclaimer when the individual is insolvent or receiving certain public benefits due to low income.

A disclaimer of interest is irrevocable. It must be a complete, and not a partial disclaimer. Such a disclaimer can be made by a legal guardian on behalf of a person who lacks the capacity to make the disclaimer themselves, but this usually requires the finding by a court that the disclaimer is in the ward's best interest.

== Disclaimers and deeds of variation: England and Wales ==
In England and Wales, a disclaimer is likewise irrevocable and covers the entire testamentary gift. It may be a unilateral act but should be communicated in writing to the persons administering the estate. It does not need to be registered with the court; the persons administering the estate are obliged to retain the communication as they may be required to provide an account to the court of their actions in the administration.

A similar effect to a disclaimer (including for inheritance tax and capital gains tax purposes) can be achieved with a greater degree of flexibility through the use of a "deed of variation" (or "deed of family arrangement"). A person or persons due to inherit property may enter into such a deed with the personal representatives (executors or administrators of an intestate estate) and redirect property due to the persons entering into the deed to whomsoever they wish. However, one cannot vary one's entitlement under a deed of variation. A deed of variation may be revocable or irrevocable. Disclaimers and deeds of variation may be overturned by the bankruptcy court and assets traced.

== Disclaimer of other interests ==
In addition to the more typical disclaimer under wills, an individual may also be able to disclaim his interest as the beneficiary of a life insurance policy or employee benefit plans. It may also apply to concurrent interests in real property that automatically transfer after death by operation of law rather than by the rules of inheritance (such as joint tenancies or tenancies by the entirety).
