= Nil rate band =

The nil rate band (NRB) is a term defined and used within the tax legislation of the United Kingdom (the Inheritance Tax Act 1984, abbreviated as IHTA 1984) which establishes the threshold below which some or all of the value of a gift, a death estate, or assets held within a trust, is subject to a zero rate of Inheritance Tax in the United Kingdom on an occasion of charge to Inheritance Tax. An occasion of charge to Inheritance Tax may not only be the death of an individual, but may also the date of a gift or of another act causing (or deemed to cause) a transfer of value to occur from one person to another person, trust or entity.

The concept of the nil rate band was not created by IHTA 1984, having been present in the preceding succession tax legislation that created Estate Duty and Inheritance Tax's immediate predecessor, Capital Transfer Tax. The amount of the Nil Rate Band has tended to increase over time to so as to keep pace with inflation; these adjustments can affect how many estates are taxed, with increases in the NRB leading to fewer estates being taxed, and periods without increase potentially leading to more estates being taxed above 0%. Changes in the amount of the Nil Rate Band are not retrospective, in the sense that they apply to raise the threshold of the Nil Rate Band for transfers occurring on a date after the change occurs.

Broadly speaking, Chargeable Lifetime Transfers, deemed transfers (such as that arising at the tenth anniversary of a trust containing Relevant Property as defined by the IHTA 1986), that exceed the Nil Rate Band and chargeable transfers on death that exceed the Nil Rate Band may be liable to IHT at a rate of 20% (for Chargeable Lifetime Transfers) or 40% (for transfers occurring on death). A lower rate of Inheritance Tax (36%) may be charged when the transfers on death are made in part to qualifying charitable beneficiaries and an effective rate of 6% (or a proportion of that amount determined in part by how long the assets have been held in trust) may apply when assets leave a trust or are held in trust after the tenth anniversary of the creation of the trust. It is important to recognise that the Nil Rate Band is treated in the legislation not as an exemption from liability from Inheritance Tax, but instead has the effect of making certain transfers of value liable to tax at a rate of 0%.

== The Transferable Nil Rate Band ==
The Chancellor of the Exchequer's Autumn Statement on 9 October 2007 announced that with immediate effect the Nil Rate Band of one spouse or civil partner was to be transferable to the surviving spouse or civil partner. Thus, for the 2007/8 tax year, spouses and civil partners could pass on assets of up to £600,000 without inheritance tax being paid from their estates, whilst a single person could only pass on £300,000. The mechanism by which this was achieved was that on the death of the second spouse to die, the nil rate band threshold applying at the date of the death of the second spouse would be increased by a percentage of the nil-rate band at the date of death of the predeceasing spouse which was not used on their death.

For example, if in 2007/08 the first married spouse (or civil partner) to die were to leave £120,000 to their children and the rest of their estate to their spouse, there would be no inheritance tax due at that time and £180,000 or 60% of the nil-rate band would be unused. Later, upon the second death the nil-rate band would be 160% of the allowance for a single person, so that if the surviving spouse also died in 2007/08 the first £480,000 (160% of £300,000) of the surviving spouse's estate would be exempt from inheritance tax. If the surviving spouse died in a later year when the nil-rate band had reached £350,000, the first £560,000 (160% of £350,000) of the estate would be tax exempt.

This measure was also extended to existing widows, widowers and bereaved civil partners on 9 October 2007. If their late spouse or partner had not used all of their inheritance tax allowance at the time of the spouse's death, then the unused percentage of that allowance can now be added to the single person's allowance when the surviving spouse or partner dies. This applies irrespective of the date on which the first spouse died, but special rules apply if the surviving spouse remarries.

In a judgement following an unsuccessful appeal to a 2006 decision by the European Court of Human Rights, it was held that the above does not apply to siblings living together. The crucial factor in such cases was determined to be the existence of a public undertaking, carrying with it a body of rights and obligations of a contractual nature, rather than the length or supportive nature of the relationship.

Prior to this legislative change, the most common means of ensuring that the Nil-Rate Band of a pre-deceasing spouse was utilised was to include a legacy in the predeceasing spouse's will of any unused portion of their Nil Rate Band at death to the trustees of a discretionary trust, with the remaining part of the estate being left either to the surviving spouse absolutely (i.e. not subject to any restrictions) or on trusts which entitled them to benefit from the income of the trust during his or her lifetime. Both wills would typically take substantially the same form so that the trust arose regardless of the order of the deaths of the spouses. The potential beneficiaries of the discretionary trust would typically be the spouse and children and remoter descendants of the couple. This form of will was intended to allow the survivor to benefit from the assets in the trust, but without them being treated as assets of the survivor under UK tax law.

Since the Government seeks not to profit from the death of those who gave their lives in military service or died from the results of a wound, injury, or disease associated with that military service, then the estates of such servicemen and women are exempt, totally, from any Inheritance Tax regardless of the value of the estate even if it amounts to millions of pounds. The exemption is transferable to the serviceman's or servicewoman's widow or widower. That they do qualify may be certified by application to the British MOD "Joint Casualty and Compassionate Centre" (JCCC). The JCCC then informs the HMRC of that decision. The exemption does not apply to ex-servicemen or servicewomen who die from causes unrelated to their military service.

== Additional nil rate band on main residence ==
In the summer budget of 2015 a new measure was outlined to reduce the burden of IHT for some estates by providing additional tax-free allowances in cases where the family home passed to direct descendants. This measure, called the Residence Nil-Rate Band (RNRB), came into effect upon the passage of the Finance (No. 2) Act 2015, and provided for the following scheduled amounts:

- £100,000 for the 2017-18 tax year
- £125,000 for the 2018-19 tax year
- £150,000 for the 2019-20 tax year
- £175,000 for the 2020-21 tax year
- for subsequent tax years, the amount will be linked to the September–September rise in the consumer price index

The Finance Act 2016 provided further relief in cases where all or part of the additional band could be lost, where a person had downsized to a less valuable residence or had ceased to own a residence after 8 July 2015 (and before the person has died). This is conditional upon the deceased having left that smaller residence, or assets of equivalent value, to direct descendants. These are defined as lineal descendants, spouses or civil partners of such lineal descendants, or former spouses or civil partners who have not become anyone else's spouse or civil partner.

The introduction of the RNRB means that a married couple leaving a residence to direct descendants can currently leave up to £1,000,000 tax-free between them (2021/22 tax year). This tax-free allowance is diminished for estates worth more than £2 million.

== Historical thresholds of the Nil Rate Band ==
- 2009-26 £325,000 (s4 Finance Act 2007)
- 2008-09 £312,000 (s155 Finance Act 2006)
- 2007-08 £300,000 (s98 Finance Act 2005)
- 2006-07 £285,000

NOTE: The £350,000 threshold stated in the s4 Finance Act 2007, which was to take effect in the 2010-11 fiscal year, never came into force.

== See also ==
- Inheritance Tax (United Kingdom)
