= Inheritance tax in the United Kingdom =

In the United Kingdom, the inheritance tax is a transfer tax. It was introduced with effect from 18 March 1986, replacing capital transfer tax. The UK has the fourth highest inheritance tax rate in the world, according to conservative think tank, the Tax Foundation, though only a very small proportion of the population pays it; 3.7% of deaths recorded in the UK in the 2020–21 tax year resulted in inheritance tax liabilities.

== History ==
Before the introduction of estate duty by the Finance Act 1894, there was a complex system of different taxes relating to the inheritance of property, that applied to either realty (land) or personalty (other personal property):

Succession Duty Act 1853 (Note: Section 55.)
- Act of Parliament
- Parliament of the United Kingdom
- Long title: An Act for granting to Her Majesty Duties on Succession to Property, and for altering certain Provisions of the Acts charging Duties on Legacies and Shares of Personal Estates.
- Citation: 16 & 17 Vict. c. 51
- Territorial extent: United Kingdom

Dates
- Royal assent: 4 August 1853
- Commencement: 19 May 1853 (Note: Section 54.)
- Repealed: 13 March 1975
Other legislation
Amended by	Administration of Justice (Miscellaneous Provisions) Act 1933
Repealed by	Crown Suits, &c. Act 1865; Statute Law Revision Act 1892; Finance Act 1949; Northern Ireland (Crown Proceedings) Order 1949; Finance Act 1975

Status: Partially repealed

Text of statute as originally enacted

1. From 1694, probate duty, introduced as a stamp duty on wills entered in probate, applied to personalty.
2. From 1780, legacy duty was an inheritance duty paid by the receiver of personalty, graduated according to consanguinity.
3. From 1853, succession duty, a duty introduced by the Succession Duty Act 1853 (16 & 17 Vict. c. 51), applied to realty settlements, taking effect on the death of the settlor.
4. From 1881, account duty applied as an anti-avoidance duty on lifetime gifts made to avoid paying legacy duty.
5. From 1885, corporation duty applied to the annual value of certain property vested in corporate and unincorporated bodies that would otherwise have avoided any of the above duties.
6. From 1889 (scheduled for expiry in 1896), estate duty was levied as an additional stamp duty on estates and successions greater than £10,000 in value.

In 1894, estate duty replaced probate duty, account duty, certain additional succession duties, and temporary estate duty.

Legacy duty and succession duty were later abolished by the Finance Act 1949, followed by the abolition of corporation duty by the Finance Act 1959. The three-year period for gifts made prior to death was extended to five years by the Finance Act 1946, and then to seven years by the Finance Act 1969.

Estate duty became more progressive in scale, eventually peaking in 1969 with the highest marginal rate fixed at 85% of amounts in excess of £750,000, provided that total duty did not exceed 80% of the value of the total estate.

Estate duty was abolished with the passage of the Finance Act 1975, which created the capital transfer tax, with the following characteristics:

- It captured all transfers of value, not made at an arm's length basis, by which the transferor's estate was less in value after the disposition than it was before.
- Value was generally defined as "the price which the property might reasonably be expected to fetch in the open market at that time; but that price shall not be assumed to be reduced on the ground that the whole property is to be placed on the market at one and the same time."
- Transfers (in excess of specified limits, or not otherwise excluded) made during a person's lifetime were accumulated with tax assessed on a sliding scale on the total amount.
- All transfers made at death or within three years before were taxable at a separate, higher sliding scale.
- Where the transferor was domiciled in the United Kingdom, tax was chargeable on all subject property; otherwise, it was chargeable only on property situated in the UK.

Capital transfer tax was reduced in scope during the Thatcher years, with most lifetime gifts removed by the Finance Act 1986. The tax was renamed as inheritance tax.

== Framework of IHT ==
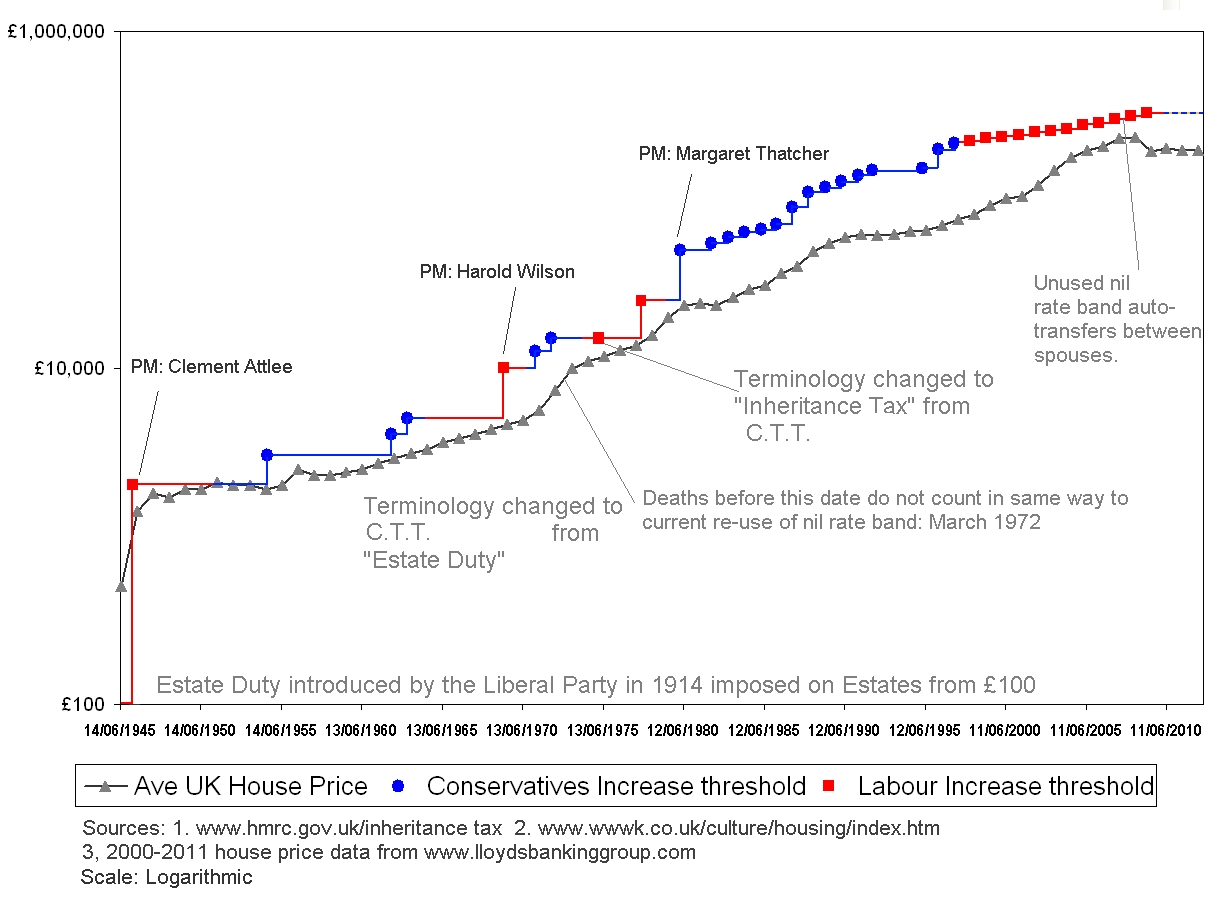
Inheritance tax thresholds and party responsible for each increase. Note the correlation with average house price (grey).

=== Estate on death ===
For IHT purposes, a person's estate includes:

1. The aggregate of all the property, other than excluded property and specified interests in possession, to which he is beneficially entitled;
2. Beneficial entitlement includes the general power to dispose or charge money on any property;
3. Except where otherwise provided, the person's liabilities must be taken into account, but it does not include liability with respect to any other tax that may arise on the transfer, and a liability incurred by a transferor shall be taken into account only to the extent that it was incurred for a consideration in money or money's worth.

Excluded property comprises:

1. Property situated outside the United Kingdom, where the person beneficially entitled to it is an individual domiciled outside the United Kingdom;
2. Decorations and awards granted for valour or gallant conduct, and which have never been the subject of a disposition for a consideration in money or money's worth; and
3. Certain specified securities.

Relief is also granted, where the value of the estate is reduced with respect to specified business property, agricultural property, woodlands, certain transfers made within three years of death made at a diminished value, and certain other cases.

=== Chargeable transfers before death ===
Deductions will be made from an estate's nil rate band with respect to transfers of value made in excess of specified limits, other than "potentially exempt transfers" made more than seven years before the transferor's death. Transfers of value made within specified limits are known as "exempt transfers".

Transfers of value will also include gifts arising from the amount by which an asset is sold for less than it could have been sold on the open market, as for a sale from a parent to a child. Gifts can also arise where:

- a lease is granted at less than full market rent, shares in a private company are rearranged, rights in such shares are altered, or there has been agreement to act as a guarantor for someone else's debts
- transfers of value, at a loss to the donor, have been made to certain trusts
- premiums have been paid on a life insurance policy for the benefit of someone else
- the deceased ceased to have a right to a benefit from a trust or settlement

Where the value of such transfers exhausts the amount available to the nil rate band, IHT is assessed on the excess amount, to which the recipients of such transfers bear the liability to pay.

=== Types of estates exempt from IHT ===
For deaths occurring on or after 1 September 2006, the following estates are effectively excepted from liability for IHT:

Types of excepted estates for Inheritance Tax purposes
Type	Qualifying conditions
Low value estates	the deceased died domiciled in the United Kingdom (UK); the gross value of the estate does not exceed the Inheritance Tax nil rate band; if the estate includes any assets in trust, they are held in a single trust and the gross value does not exceed £150,000; if the estate includes foreign assets, their gross value does not exceed £100,000; if there are any specified transfers, their chargeable value does not exceed £150,000; the deceased had not made a gift with reservation of benefit; gifts out of income totalling more than £3,000 in any year must be shown in full; no charge arises on the individual's death under any of the provisions relating to alternatively secured pensions; For claims to transfer the unused nil rate band from the estate of a predeceased spouse or civil partner, the following additional conditions apply: the full nil rate band must be available to transfer from the earlier death so that the deceased's nil rate band is increased by 100%; there is only one predeceased spouse or civil partner; a suitable claim is made to transfer the unused nil rate band
Exempt estates	Where the gross value of the estate does not exceed £1 million and there is no tax to pay because either or both conditions relating to transfers to a spouse or civil partner, or absolute gifts to one or more charities, applies, and no other exemption or relief can be taken into account. The conditions for these estates are that: the deceased and the deceased's spouse or civil partner have always been domiciled in the UK; the gross value of the estate does not exceed £1 million and the net chargeable value of the estate after deduction of liabilities and Spouse or Civil Partner Exemption and/or Charity Exemption only does not exceed the Inheritance Tax threshold; if the estate includes any assets in trust, they are held in a single trust and the gross value does not exceed £150,000 (unless the settled property passes to a spouse or civil partner, or to a charity, in which case the limit is waived); if the estate includes foreign assets, their gross value does not exceed £100,000; if there are any specified transfers, their chargeable value does not exceed £150,000, and the deceased had not made a gift with reservation of benefit; gifts out of income of more than £3,000 in any year must be shown in full; no charge arises on the individual's death under any of the provisions relating to alternatively secured pensions; In Scotland, spousal and charity exemptions must be calculated on the basis that any entitlement to legitim against the estate will be claimed in full.
Foreign domiciliaries	Where the gross value of the estate in the UK does not exceed £150,000. The conditions for these estates are that: the deceased died domiciled outside the UK; the deceased was never domiciled in the UK or treated as domiciled in the UK for Inheritance Tax purposes; the deceased's UK estate consisted only of cash or listed shares and securities passing under a will or intestacy or by survivorship
Blue Light Exemption	When a member or former member of the armed forces dies as a result of injuries or disease sustained while on active service their whole estate is exempt. The Finance Act 2015 extended this to individuals who work in emergency situations. This would include care workers who die as a result of COVID-19 including people who lose their life at any point in the future if a clear link to the coronavirus can be proven.

=== Rate of tax ===
Tax is assessed at 40% of the net value of the estate, after application of the nil rate band. The applicable nil rate band will depend on the date of death: if the date falls at any time from 6 August to 5 April in a given tax year, the current year's band will apply; but, where the date is after 5 April but before 6 August, and application for a grant is filed before 6 August, the prior year's band will apply.

For deaths occurring after 5 April 2012, the tax is assessed at 36%, where at least 10% of a specified baseline amount of the estate has been bequeathed as charitable gifts. For purposes of calculation, the property of the estate is separated into three components, each of which is tested to see if the charitable gifts are sufficient to qualify for the lesser rate:

- the survivorship component, comprising joint or common property that passes on death by survivorship or special destination;
- the settled property component, made up of all settled property in which the deceased had an interest in possession to which he was beneficially entitled immediately before death; and
- the general component, consisting of all other property in the estate, with the exception of that arising from gifts with reservation.

If applicable gifts meet the 10% threshold for a given component, in certain circumstances, upon election, the 36% rate applies to the whole estate. There are several options available for estates to be able to achieve that threshold, such as having the will specifying relevant gifts in terms of percentages of assets, or successors executing a deed of variation to attain the desired result.

=== Nil-rate band ===
The Chancellor of the Exchequer's Autumn Statement on 9 October 2007 announced that with immediate effect inheritance tax allowances (often referred to as the nil-rate band) were to be transferable between married couples and between civil partners. Thus, for the 2007/8 tax year, a married couple will in effect have an allowance of £600,000 against inheritance tax, whilst a single person's allowance remains at £300,000. The mechanism for this enhanced allowance is that on the death of the second spouse to die, the nil rate band for the second spouse is increased by the percentage of the nil-rate band which was not used on the death of the first spouse to die. For the 2026/27 tax year, the nil-rate band is £325,000 per individual and the residence nil-rate band is £175,000. This means a married couple or civil partners have a combined nil-rate band of £1,000,000. In the 2024 Autumn Budget, it was announced this would be frozen until 2030/31.

For example, if in 2007/08 the first married spouse (or civil partner) to die were to leave £120,000 to their children and the rest of their estate to their spouse, there would be no inheritance tax due at that time and £180,000 or 60% of the nil-rate band would be unused. Later, upon the second death the nil-rate band would be 160% of the allowance for a single person, so that if the surviving spouse also died in 2007/08 the first £480,000 (160% of £300,000) of the surviving spouse's estate would be exempt from inheritance tax. If the surviving spouse died in a later year when the nil-rate band had reached £350,000, the first £560,000 (160% of £350,000) of the estate would be tax exempt.

This measure was also extended to existing widows, widowers and bereaved civil partners on 9 October 2007. If their late spouse or partner had not used all of their inheritance tax allowance at the time of the spouse's death, then the unused percentage of that allowance can now be added to the single person's allowance when the surviving spouse or partner dies. This applies irrespective of the date on which the first spouse died, but special rules apply if the surviving spouse remarries.

In a judgement following an unsuccessful appeal to a 2006 decision by the European Court of Human Rights, it was held that the above does not apply to siblings living together. The crucial factor in such cases was determined to be the existence of a public undertaking, carrying with it a body of rights and obligations of a contractual nature, rather than the length or supportive nature of the relationship.

Prior to this legislative change, the most common means of ensuring that both nil-rate bands were used was called a nil band discretionary trust (now more properly known as NRB Relevant Property Trust). This is an arrangement in both wills which says that whoever is the first to die leaves their nil band to a discretionary trust for the family, and not to the survivor. The survivor can still benefit from those assets if needed, but they are not part of that survivor's estate.

As the Government seeks not to profit from the death of those who (a) gave their lives in military service, or (b) died from the results of a wound, injury, or disease associated with that military service, that the estates of such servicemen and women are exempt, totally, from any Inheritance Tax regardless of the value of the estate even if it amounts to millions of pounds, and that that exemption is then transferable to the serviceman's or servicewoman's widow or widower. That they do qualify as at (a) or (b) may be certified by application to the British MOD "Joint Casualty and Compassionate Centre" (JCCC). The JCCC then inform the HMRC of that decision. The exemption does not apply to ex-servicemen or servicewomen who die from other causes unrelated to their military service.

=== Additional nil rate band on main residence ===
In the summer budget of 2015 a new measure was outlined to reduce the burden of IHT for some estates by providing additional tax-free allowances in cases where the family home passed to direct descendants. This measure, called the Residence Nil-Rate Band (RNRB) came into effect upon the passage of the Finance (No. 2) Act 2015, and provided for the following scheduled amounts:

- £100,000 for the 2017-18 tax year
- £125,000 for the 2018-19 tax year
- £150,000 for the 2019-20 tax year
- £175,000 for the 2020-21 tax year and until 5 April 2028.

The Finance Act 2016 provided further relief in cases where all or part of the additional band could be lost, where a person had downsized to a less valuable residence or had ceased to own a residence after 8 July 2015 (and before the person has died). This is conditional upon the deceased having left that smaller residence, or assets of equivalent value, to direct descendants. These are defined as lineal descendants, spouses or civil partners of such lineal descendants, or former spouses or civil partners who have not become anyone else's spouse or civil partner.

The House of Commons Library has noted that the introduction of the RNRB means that a married couple leaving a residence to direct descendants can leave up to £900,000 tax-free between them (as of the 2018/19 tax year), with this tax-free amount rising to £1 million by April 2020. This tax-free allowance is diminished for estates worth more than £2 million.

=== Pre-owned assets ===
Effective with the 2005–06 tax year, the Finance Act 2004 introduced a retrospective income tax regime known as pre-owned asset tax (POAT) which covers transactions not made at arm's length, where a person either:

- disposes of a property, or
- contributes funds to another person to acquire a property,

and then subsequently benefits from its use.

The person liable for POAT may, while he is still alive, elect on a timely basis to have such transactions treated as gifts with reservations (thus subject to IHT) with respect to such transactions made in a given tax year.

=== Controversy ===
In 2002, Queen Elizabeth The Queen Mother left her estate (estimated at £50 million) to her daughter Elizabeth II, including works of art, jewels, antiques and her thoroughbred racehorses. A deal that had been made in 1993 ensured that The Queen was spared inheritance tax of an estimated £20 million on her mother's estate.

In 2016 published letters and a prominent article in The Guardian by a leading accountant supported by Labour Party leader Jeremy Corbyn criticised the tax-exempt arrangements of many of the largest landowners and the most capital-endowed. They advocated reform of tax on such wealth and for transparency of trusts, namely:

- Publication of the annual accounts of all trusts (as currently applicable to charitable UK trusts)
- A compulsory register of trusts.
- An extension of the taxed lifetime chargeable trusts regime to cover such entities as overseas-based fixed and discretionary trusts and companies with UK assets.
- Consideration of taxation of the largest valuable interests appointed or advanced (paid or part-paid) by trust or other entity away to new beneficiaries (presumably exempting usual reliefs such as spousal, bona fide business, charity or agricultural).

This critique followed the death of Gerald Grosvenor, 6th Duke of Westminster, whose significant at-death loose "interests", the benefit of which his children by trustees' discretion perhaps receive, demonstrate suspected tax savings. The unpublished size of the late Duke's death estate was thought to be comparable to the valuation of the family-related landholdings of £9 billion. Critics claim inheritance tax impacts more on the living standards of the middle class and less on plutocrats and the super rich. Had the estate been held personally rather than in trust, commentators estimated a potential IHT liability of approximately £4 billion.

Since 2006, tax of 20% must be paid on assets in excess of the Nil-Rate Band entering most UK non-death trusts. Periodic charges of between 0% and 6% are also due on the total value of the trust every 10 years. This regime is intended to ensure that assets held in trust bear a broadly equivalent tax burden over time to assets passing on death.

George Hodgson, interim chief executive of the Society of Trust and Estate Practitioners, counter-argued for trusts to remain private on three grounds: many beneficiaries are children or vulnerable adults; the inheritance tax exemptions and counter-tax-planning structures help to protect jobs; "An awful lot of trusts are used to hold family businesses".

Charles III paid no inheritance tax on the fortune he inherited from his mother, the late Queen.

== See also ==
- Asset-based egalitarianism
- Disclaimer of interest (including deed of variation)
- History of the English fiscal system
- Quick succession relief

== Sources ==
- HM Revenue and Customs (2015). "Guide to completing your Inheritance Tax account" (PDF). GOV.UK.
