= Pre-owned asset tax =

In the United Kingdom, Her Majesty's Revenue and Customs acted against certain inheritance tax (IHT) avoidance schemes by imposing a standalone income tax charge. The tax was introduced in the Finance Act 2004 and came into effect from 6 April 2005.

This has become known as pre-owned assets tax (POAT). POAT applies where an individual disposes of an asset but somehow retains the ability to use or enjoy it. POAT is never applicable when IHT is; therefore, the media and public have granted the issue little attention. POAT is also a retroactive tax: even if an action had no IHT repercussions at the time, POAT may be applied years after the action.
