= Inter vivos =

Legal term; transfer or gift made during one's lifetime

Inter vivos (Law Latin, between the living) is a legal term referring to a transfer or gift made during one's lifetime, as opposed to a testamentary transfer that takes effect on the death of the giver.

The term is often used to describe a trust established during one's lifetime, i.e., an inter vivos trust as opposed to a testamentary trust that is established on one's death, usually as part of a will. An inter vivos trust, by definition, includes both revocable and irrevocable trusts.

== Other meaning ==
The term inter vivos is also used to describe living organ donation, in which one patient donates an organ to another while both are alive. Generally, the organs transplanted are either non-vital organs such as corneas or redundant vital organs such as one of the two kidneys or part of a liver.
