= Settlement (trust) =

Deed by which a settlor gives up property into trust

In trust law, a settlement is a deed (also called a trust instrument) whereby real estate, land, or other property is given by a settlor into trust so the beneficiary has the limited right to the property (for example, during their life), but usually has no right to sell, bequeath or otherwise transfer it. Instead the property devolves as directed by the settlement.

== History ==
In most jurisdictions, settlements only confer beneficial rights under a trust. They were formerly used to create legal estates for life or in tail, or to make provision for portions for younger children.

== See also ==
- English trust law
- Settled Land Acts
- Trust Law
