= ESC C16 =

Extra Statutory Concession C16 (ESC C16) was an extra statutory concession, which was available in the United Kingdom until the 1^{st} of March 2012. The primary purpose of this concession was to allow shareholders of solvent companies which were surplus to requirements, to retrieve funds via the striking off method, whilst still obtaining the tax benefits, which legally were only available under a members voluntary liquidation (sometimes abbreviated to MVL).

By default, when striking a company off, the distributed funds paid out prior to the process being completed would be taxed on the shareholder as dividends. Under a members voluntary liquidation, the same funds paid out would be taxed on the shareholder as capital gains. Particularly in cases where entrepreneurs relief was available, capital gains tax typically lead to much lower personal tax bills than dividends would.

To avoid companies having to spend several thousand pounds on a formal liquidation, by concession, HMRC would allow you to have capital gains tax treatment even under a striking off, providing advance clearance was obtained and you met certain criteria.

From the 1^{st} of March 2012 this is no longer the case. If the company funds are below £25,000, upon strike off they will automatically be taxed on the shareholder as a capital gain (no application required). However, if the funds are above £25,000, the whole amount will be taxed as dividends.

Therefore solvent companies with an excess of £25,000 in the bank, benefit more from a formal liquidation. Only a firm of licensed insolvency practitioner can perform liquidations, but as a result of the concession adjustments, some firms cater to this market of voluntary liquidations.
