= Capital gains tax in the United Kingdom =

UK tax on the gains on capital assets by British individuals

Capital gains tax in the United Kingdom is a tax levied on capital gains, the profit realised on the sale of a non-inventory asset by an individual or trust in the United Kingdom. The most common capital gains are realised from the sale of shares, bonds, precious metals, real estate, and property, so the tax principally targets business owners, investors and employee share scheme participants. Gains made by companies fall under the scope of corporation tax rather than capital gains tax.

In 2017–18, total capital gains tax receipts were £8.3 billion from 265,000 individuals and £0.6 billion from trusts, on total gains of £58.9 billion. By 2024-25, CGT receipts had risen to a record £17 billion. Analysis attributed part of the increase to residential property disposals as landlords exited the private rented sector.

== Beginnings ==
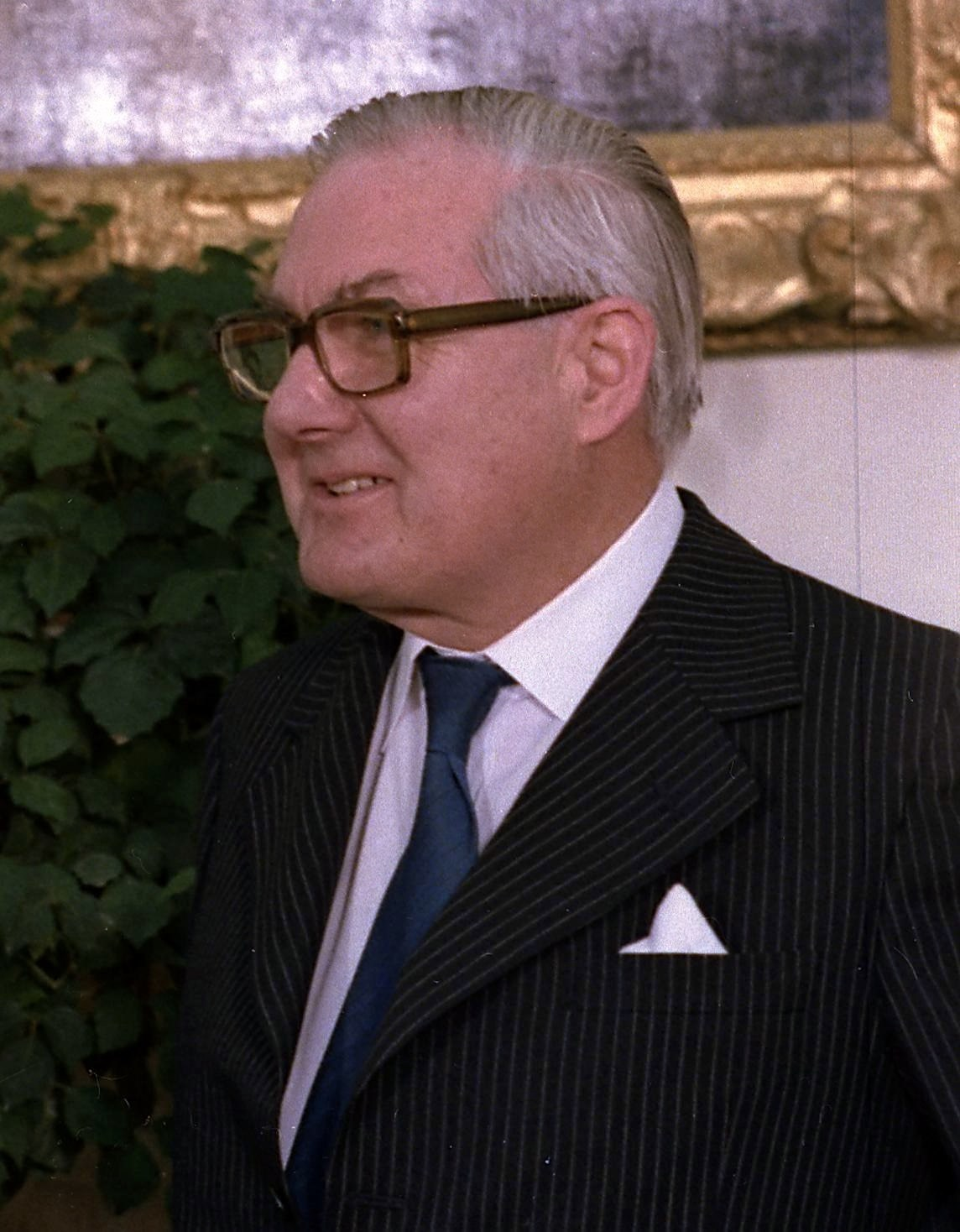
Jim Callaghan, the Chancellor of the Exchequer who introduced capital gains tax in 1965

The capital gains tax (CGT) system was introduced by Labour Chancellor James Callaghan in 1965. Prior to this, capital gains were not taxed. Channon observed that one of the primary drivers to the introduction of CGT in the UK was the rapid growth in property values after World War II. This led to property developers deliberately leaving office blocks empty so that a rental income could not be established and greater capital gains made.

== Exemptions and allowances ==
The main relief from capital gains tax in the UK is private residence relief, which brings an individual's principal residence out of scope of the tax, and personal possessions (the "chattels exemption") with a value of less than £3,000. There are also exemptions for holdings in ISAs or gilts. Certain other gains are allowed to be rolled over upon re-investment. Investments in some start up enterprises are also exempt from CGT. Allowable costs include the costs of sale of the asset. Capital losses may be used to reduce capital gains made on other assets.

In 1977, there was a general exemption for individuals from paying any tax if gains were less than £1,000 in any given tax year, which runs from 6 April to 5 April in the UK. Now known as the Annual Exempt Allowance, it rose steadily until 2020–21 when the allowance was £12,300 for individuals and £6,150 for trusts (the allowance for trusts has always been half of the threshold for individuals). Rishi Sunak's budget in March 2021 froze the allowance at this level until 2025–26, but subsequently it was announced that the allowance would be reduced to £6000 from 6 April 2023 and then to £3000 from 6 April 2024.

Labour Chancellor Gordon Brown replaced indexation allowance with taper relief in 1998 to reward risk-taking and promote enterprise. Taper relief was abolished in 2008. Indexation allowance generally reduced the tax payable on a gain by increasing the cost of the asset in line with inflation. Taper relief reduced the tax payable on assets that were owned for longer periods of time and its removal was necessitated, at least in part, because the UK government felt that private equity firms were making excessive profits by benefiting from overly generous taper relief on business assets. The changes were criticised by a number of groups including the Federation of Small Businesses, who claimed that the new rules would increase the CGT liability of small businesses and discourage entrepreneurship in the UK.

== Rates ==
From 1965 to 1988, most gains incurred a 30% rate of capital gains tax. In 1988, Conservative chancellor Nigel Lawson aligned rates with those for income tax (where the top rate was 40% at the time) and this regime continued until 2008, when Gordon Brown changed the rate to 18% for all taxpayers.

April 2008 also saw the introduction of Entrepreneurs' Relief, which applied a lower 10% rate to some gains made by business owners, directors and employees on disposals of business assets and company shares. The relief has always had a lifetime limit on qualifying gains by an individual, which was initially set at £1 million.

In the March 2010 budget, Labour chancellor Alistair Darling introduced a rate of 28% for individuals paying the higher or additional rate of income tax. The rate remained 10% under Entrepreneurs' Relief for those higher rate taxpayers, and the limit for the relief was raised to £2 million. It was raised to £5M three months later by the new Conservative/Liberal Democrat coalition government, who then doubled it to £10M in the March 2011 budget.

From 6 April 2016, George Osborne announced new lower rates of 10% (for basic rate taxpayers) and 20% (for higher rate taxpayers) for non-property and non-carried interest disposals; the higher rates continued to apply to gains on residential property, other than the main home. Trustees or personal representatives for the estate of someone who has died paid 28% on residential properties and 20% on other chargeable assets. Jeremy Hunt reduced the higher rate on residential property to 24% from 6 April 2024.

Entrepreneurs' Relief was renamed Business Asset Disposal Relief in the 2020 budget, and the lifetime allowance under the relief was reduced from £10 million to £1 million.

In the October 2024 budget, Labour chancellor Rachel Reeves increased the lower and higher rates from 30 October 2024 to 18% and 24%, bringing them into line with the rates payable on residential property sales. From 6 April 2025, rates on carried interest were increased from 18% and 28% to a single rate of 32%.

== Reporting requirements ==
When an asset is disposed of and there is a capital gain, there is a potential that there is a requirement to report this capital gain to HMRC. Reporting requirements depend on the nature of the asset.

UK residential property

A sale of UK residential property on or after 6 April 2020 must be reported, and any CGT paid, within:

- 60 days of selling the property if the completion date was on or after 27 October 2021,
- 30 days of selling the property if the completion date was between 6 April 2020 and 26 October 2021.

For people who are not UK residents, this requirement applies even if there is no CGT liability as a result of the sale of UK residential property.

Other assets

If the capital gain is not from a residential property sold after 6 April 2020, the gain can be reported in a Self Assessment tax return, or using the 'real time' Capital Gains Tax Service. The deadline for reporting these gains is the usual Self Assessment filing deadline, being 31 January following the tax year of the disposal for online returns.

== Demographics ==
Between 2011 and 2019, very large gains have become more prevalent and make up a larger proportion of total net gains, while smaller gains also rose, albeit at a slower rate. A small proportion of taxpayers pay capital gains tax in consecutive years, and most gains are made on company shares. The majority of taxpayers are over the age of 55.

== Example computation ==
This is an example computation for an individual who pays tax at the higher rate and has made a sale on a non-residential asset, showing the effect of the change in annual exempt amount between the tax years 2022-23 and 2023-24:

Example
	2022-23	2023-24	2024-25
Value of asset	100,000	100,000	100,000
Cost of asset	-30,000	-30,000	-30,000
Gain	70,000	70,000	70,000
Annual Exempt Amount	-12,300	-6,000	-3,000
Taxable Gain	57,700	64,000	67,000
Tax @ 20%	11,500	12,800	13,400

== Suggested reforms ==
=== 2020 Government consultation ===
Chancellor Rishi Sunak requested a review of CGT by the Office of Tax Simplification in July 2020. Their first report was published in November of that year, followed by a second – on potential practical and administrative improvements – in May 2021.

==== Rates and income tax ====
The report made the recommendation to consider aligning capital gains tax rates with income tax rates, or addressing boundary issues between the two taxes.

Under the first option, there would need to be appropriate relief for indexation, adequate interaction with company tax positions and more flexibility for use of losses.

If there remained a disparity between the capital gains and income tax rates, the number of CGT rates should be reduced and there should be further consideration of the impact of an individual's other income. It should also be considered whether capital rewards for personal labour should be taxed at income tax rates, even if capital tax rates were to remain distinct.

==== Annual Exempt Allowance ====
In any case, it was concluded that consideration should be put towards reducing the Annual Exempt Amount from its level of £12,300 in the tax year 2022-23. The Annual Exempt Amount was reduced to £6,000 for the tax year 2023-24, and further reduced to £3,000 for the tax year 2024-25.

==== Interaction with inheritance tax ====
Under circumstances where an asset owner dies, they may benefit from a relief and exemption from inheritance tax, as well as benefiting from an uplift on the base cost of the capital gain. It was suggested that the base cost could remain at the cost to the person who died for capital gains purposes. This may require the rebasing of all assets, perhaps to the year 2000.

==== Business reliefs ====
It was concluded that the government should consider replacing Business Asset Disposal Relief, formerly Entrepreneurs' Relief, with a relief more focused on retirement by increasing the minimum shareholding, increasing the holding period of assets and introducing a minimum age limit at a high level.

== See also ==
- Taxation in the United Kingdom
- Capital Gains Tax History 1980 - 2022 (Institute of Fiscal Studies) (archive link)
- Capital Gains Tax Review (Office of Tax Simplification)
