= Taxation in the United Kingdom =

United Kingdom tax codes

In the United Kingdom, taxation may involve payments to at least three different levels of government: central government (HM Revenue and Customs), devolved governments and local government. Central government revenues come primarily from income tax, National Insurance contributions, value added tax, corporation tax and fuel duty. Local government revenues come primarily from grants from central government funds, business rates, Council Tax in Great Britain or domestic rates in Northern Ireland, and increasingly from fees and charges such as those for on-street parking. In the fiscal year 2023–24, total government revenue was forecast to be £1,139.1 billion, or 40.9 per cent of GDP, with income taxes and National Insurance contributions standing at around £470 billion.

== History ==
A uniform Land Tax, originally introduced in England during the late 17th century, formed the main source of government revenue throughout the 18th century and the early 19th century.

=== Napoleonic wars ===
Income tax was announced in Britain by William Pitt the Younger in his budget of December 1798 and introduced in 1799, to pay for weapons and equipment in preparation for the Napoleonic Wars. Pitt's new graduated (progressive) income tax began at a levy of 2 old pence in the pound (1/120) on annual incomes over £60 (equivalent to £6,666 as of 2025), and increased up to a maximum of 2 shillings (10 per cent) on annual incomes of over £200. Pitt hoped that the new income tax would raise £10 million, but receipts for 1799 totalled just over £6 million.

Income tax was levied under five schedules. Income not falling within those schedules was not taxed. The schedules were:

- Schedule A (tax on income from United Kingdom land)
- Schedule B (tax on commercial occupation of land)
- Schedule C (tax on income from public securities)
- Schedule D (tax on trading income, income from professions and vocations, interest, overseas income and casual income)
- Schedule E (tax on employment income)

Later, Schedule F (tax on United Kingdom dividend income) was added.

Pitt's income tax was levied from 1799 to 1802, when it was abolished by Henry Addington during the Peace of Amiens. Addington had taken over as prime minister in 1801. The income tax was reintroduced by Addington in 1803 when hostilities recommenced, but it was again abolished in 1816, one year after the Battle of Waterloo.

Considerable controversy was aroused by the malt, house, windows and income taxes. The malt tax was easy to collect from brewers; even after it was reduced in 1822, it produced over 10 per cent of government's annual revenues through the 1840s. The house tax mostly hit London town houses; the windows tax mostly hit country manors.

=== Peel's income tax ===
The income tax was reintroduced by Sir Robert Peel in the Income Tax Act 1842. Peel, as a Conservative, had opposed income tax in the 1841 general election, but a growing budget deficit required a new source of funds. The new income tax of 7d in the pound (about 2.9%), based on Addington's model, was imposed on annual incomes above £150 (equivalent to £14,665 as of 2025).

=== Provisional Collection of Taxes Acts ===
The Provisional Collection of Taxes Act 1913 (3 & 4 Geo. 5. c. 3), replaced later by the Provisional Collection of Taxes Act 1968, authorised collection of taxes on the basis of a Budget resolution passed by the House of Commons, in advance of subsequent legislation implementing the budget.

=== First World War ===
The war (1914–1918) was financed by borrowing large sums at home and abroad, by new taxes, and by inflation. It was implicitly financed by postponing maintenance and repair, and canceling capital expenditure. The government avoided indirect taxes because they raised the cost of living, and caused discontent among the working class. There was a strong emphasis on being "fair" and being "scientific". The public generally supported the heavy new taxes, with minimal complaints. The Treasury rejected proposals for a stiff capital levy, which the Labour Party wanted to use to weaken the capitalists. Instead, there was an excess profits tax, of 50% on profits above the normal pre-war level; the rate was raised to 80% in 1917. Excise taxes were added on luxury imports such as automobiles, clocks and watches. There was no sales tax or value added tax. The main increase in revenue came from the income tax, which in 1915 went up to 3s. 6d in the pound (17.5%), and individual exemptions were lowered. The income tax rate increased to 5s. (25%) in 1916, and 6s. (30%) in 1918. Altogether, taxes provided at most 30% of national expenditure, with the rest from borrowing. The national debt soared from £625 million to £7,800 million. Government bonds typically paid 5% p.a. Inflation escalated so that the pound in 1919 purchased only a third of the basket it had purchased in 1914. Wages were laggard, and the poor and retired were especially hard hit.

=== Modern rules ===
Britain's income tax has changed over the years. Originally it taxed a person's income regardless of who was beneficially entitled to that income, but now tax is paid on income to which the taxpayer is beneficially entitled.

Most companies were taken out of the income tax net in 1965 when corporation tax was introduced. These changes were consolidated by the Income and Corporation Taxes Act 1970.

Also the schedules under which tax is levied have changed. Schedule B was abolished in 1988, and Schedule C in 1996. For income tax purposes, the remaining schedules were superseded by the Income Tax (Earnings and Pensions) Act 2003, which repealed Schedule E, and the Income Tax (Trading and Other Income) Act 2005, which also repealed Schedule F. For corporation tax purposes, the Schedular system was repealed and superseded by the Corporation Tax Acts of 2009 and 2010.

The highest rate of income tax peaked in the Second World War at 99.25%. This was slightly reduced after the war and was around 97.5 per cent (nineteen shillings and sixpence in the pound) through the 1950s and 1960s.

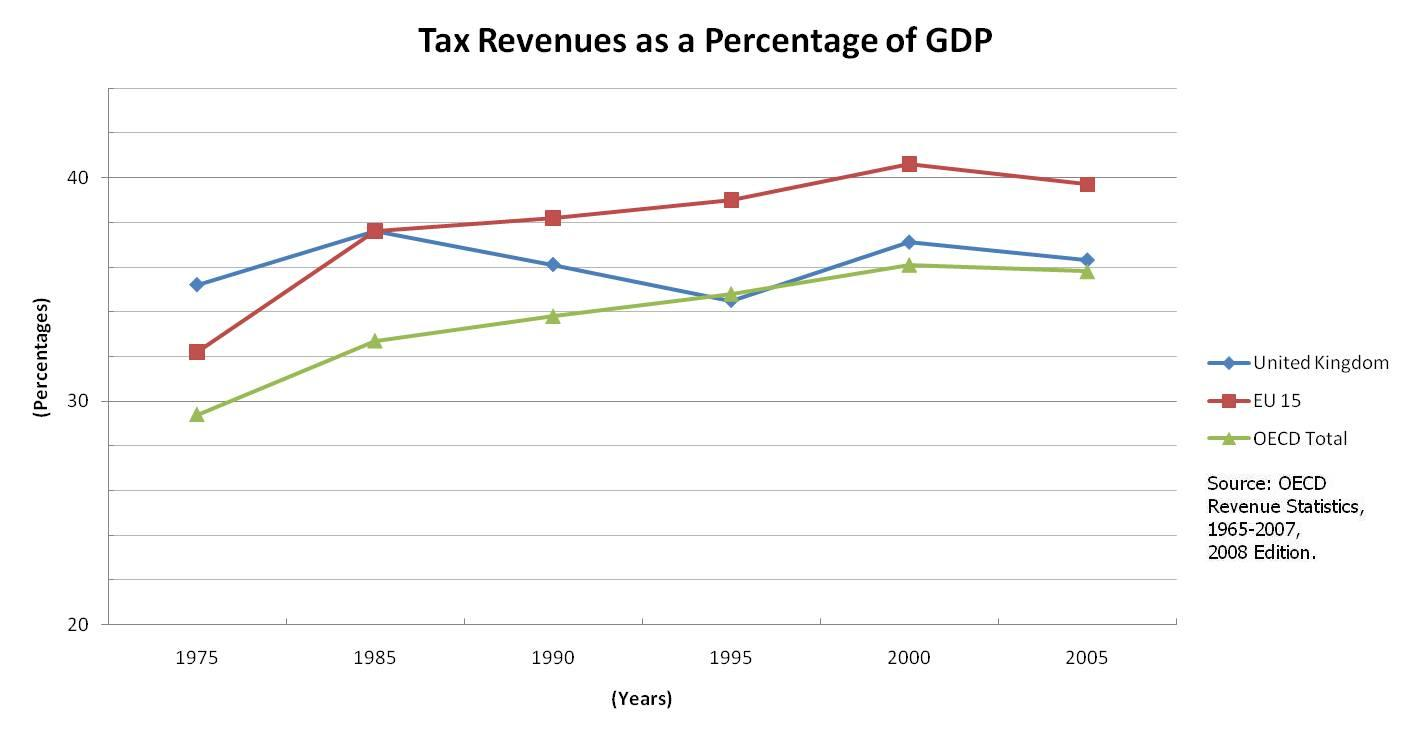
Tax revenues as a percentage of GDP for the UK in comparison to the OECD and the EU 15

In 1971, the top rate of income tax on earned income was cut to 75%. A surcharge of 15% on investment income kept the overall top rate on that income at 90%. In 1974 the top tax rate on earned income was again raised, to 83%. With the investment income surcharge this raised the overall top rate on investment income to 98%, the highest permanent rate since the war. This applied to incomes over £20,000 (equivalent to £189,615 in 2025 terms). In 1974, around 750,000 people paid the higher (but not necessarily the top) rate of income tax.

Margaret Thatcher, who favoured indirect taxation, reduced personal income tax rates during the 1980s. In the first budget after her election victory in 1979, the top rate was reduced from 83% to 60% and the basic rate from 33% to 30%. The basic rate was further cut in three subsequent budgets, to 29% in 1986 budget, 27% in 1987 and 25% in 1988. The top rate of income tax was cut to 40% in the 1988 budget. The investment income surcharge was abolished in 1985.

Subsequent governments reduced the basic rate further, to the present level of 20% in 2007. Since 1976 (when it stood at 35%), the basic rate has been reduced by 15 percentage points, but this reduction has been largely offset by increases in national insurance contributions and value added tax.

In 2010 a new top rate of 50% was introduced on income over £150,000. The then opposition Conservative party claimed that this policy caused a decrease in revenue to the Exchequer, by incentivizing tax-avoidance or emigration/offshoring.

In the 2012 budget this rate was cut to 45% for 2013–14. The Budget Red Book showed an Office for Budget Responsibility (OBR) prediction that the rate cut would be a net cost to the treasury of around £100 million per year Chancellor George Osborne said that the lower tax rate led to an £8 billion increase in the tax paid by additional rate taxpayers from £38 billion to £46 billion.

The OBR has discussed the successive changes in tax take drawing attention to complications from "forestalling" (and "unwinding" of forestalling) and "income-shifting" (as both rate changes were pre-announced, some high earners were first able to bring forward earnings to before the rate increase came into effect, under the outgoing Labour government, and then delay them to occur after the rate decrease under the new Lib-Con Coalition Government). They also discuss systemic reasons for the tax falling in the first instance, but say "It is too early to provide a meaningful reassessment of the costing of the reduction."

In September 2022 chancellor, Kwazi Kwarteng, announced that from April 2023 the top rate of tax would be 40% and the basic rate 19%, as part of what was referred to as a "Growth Plan". After the collapse of the Truss government, the changes were cancelled.

HMRC has published online a comprehensive set of manuals about the UK tax system.

Board of Excise
Board of Inland Revenue
Board of Taxes
Board of Customs
Board of Customs and Excise
Board of Stamps
HMRC
│
1600
│
1650
│
1700
│
1750
│
1800
│
1850
│
1900
│
1950
│
2000
Timeline of tax administration in England, Great Britain, and the UK

== Overview ==
A pie chart of the revenues of each type of tax in the UK

Income tax forms the single largest source of revenues collected by the government. The second largest source of government revenue is National Insurance Contributions. The third largest source of government revenues is value added tax (VAT), and the fourth-largest is corporation tax.

=== Residence and domicile ===
An individual's UK tax residence is generally determined by the Statutory Residence Test, which has applied since 6 April 2013. It considers factors such as the amount of time spent in the United Kingdom and, where relevant, work, accommodation and family ties. UK residents are normally taxed on their UK and foreign income and gains, while non-residents are generally taxed only on UK income and certain UK gains.

Until April 2025, some UK residents whose permanent home was outside the country could use the remittance basis, under which certain foreign income and gains were taxed only when brought to the UK. From 6 April 2025, this system was replaced by the four-year foreign income and gains (FIG) regime. People who become UK tax resident after at least ten consecutive tax years of non-UK residence may claim relief on eligible foreign income and gains during their first four years of UK residence.

A company is generally resident in the United Kingdom for tax purposes if it is incorporated there or if its central management and control are exercised there, subject to any applicable tax treaty.

Double taxation of income and capital gains may be reduced or eliminated under an applicable tax treaty. The United Kingdom has an extensive network of bilateral double-taxation agreements.

=== The tax year ===
The tax year is sometimes also called the "fiscal year". A company's accounting year, which has some relevance for corporation tax purposes, can be chosen by the company and often runs from 1 April to 31 March, in line with the fiscal year.

The British personal tax year runs from 6 to 5 April in the following year.

== Personal taxes ==
=== Income tax ===
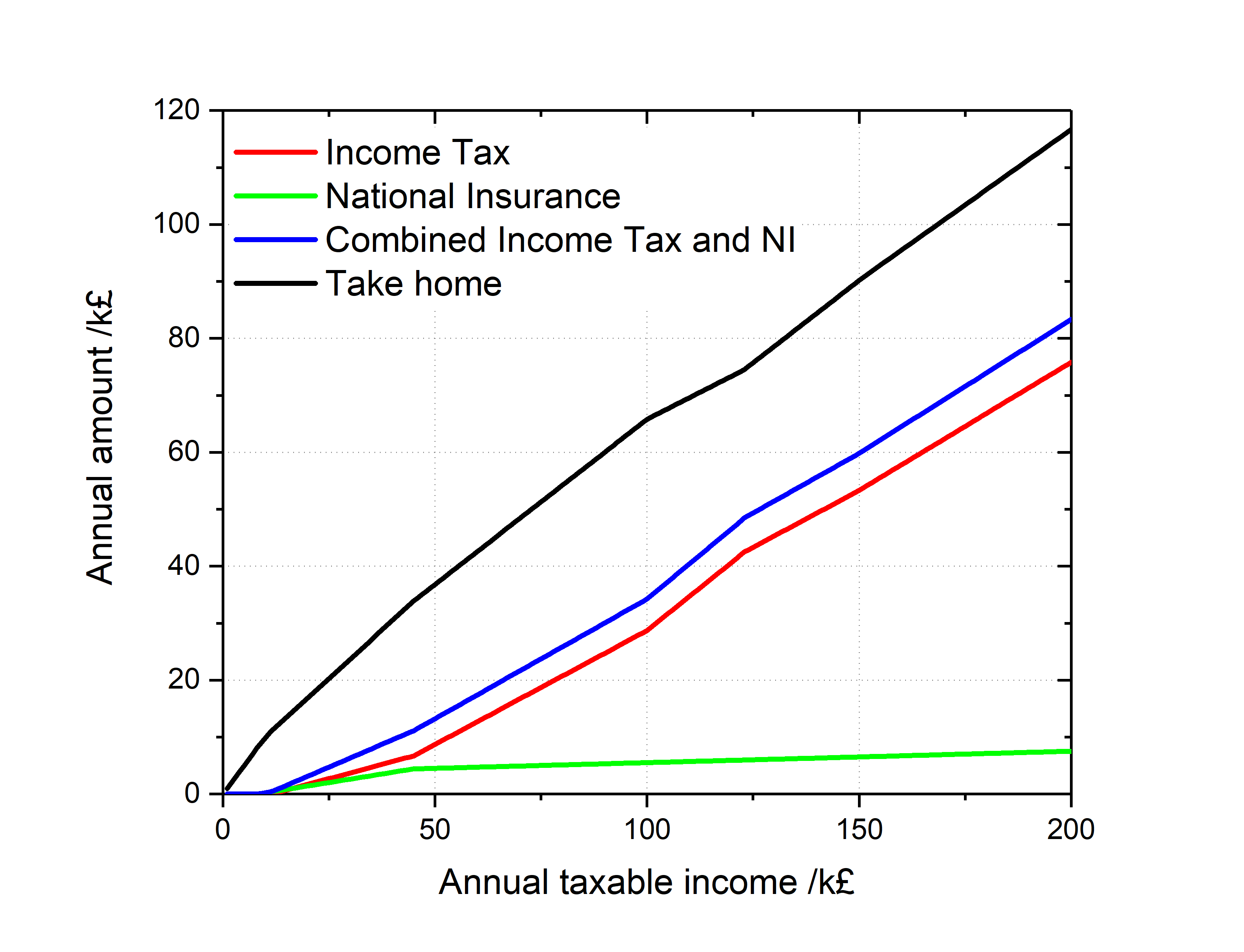
UK income tax and National Insurance charges (2016–17)

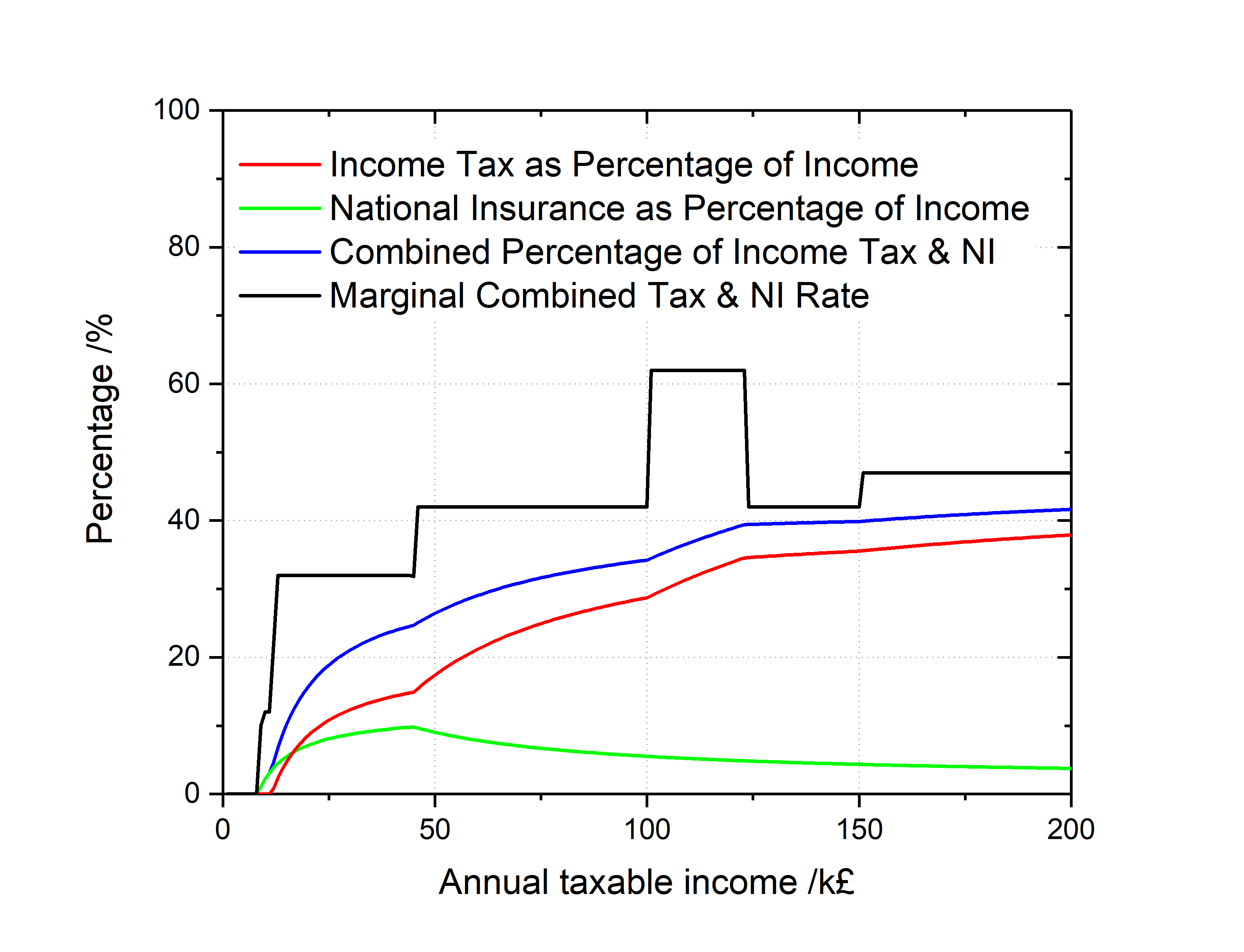
UK income tax and National Insurance as a percentage of taxable pay, and marginal income tax and NI rate (2016–17)

Annual income percentiles for taxpayers in the UK, before and after income tax. In the SVG file, hover over a graph to highlight it.

Income tax is the single largest source of government revenue in the United Kingdom, making up about 30 per cent of the total, followed by National Insurance contributions at around 20 per cent. Almost 1/3 of all income tax revenue is paid by the top 1% of earners (>£160,000), and 90% of all income tax revenue is paid by the top 50% of taxpayers with the highest incomes. The Scottish Parliament has full control over income tax rates and thresholds on all non-savings and non-dividend income liable for tax by taxpayers resident in Scotland. The Welsh Parliament also has some powers over income tax in Wales, but they have not been used.

Each person has an income tax personal allowance, and income up to this amount in each tax year is free of tax. Until the 2030/31 tax year, the tax-free allowance for individuals with income less than £100,000 is £12,570.

Any income above the personal allowance is taxed depending on how much of it falls into a number of bands.

Taxpayer's income is assessed for tax according to a prescribed order, with income from employment using up the personal allowance and being taxed first, followed by savings income (from interest or otherwise unearned) and then dividends.

Foreign income of United Kingdom residents is taxed as United Kingdom income, but to prevent double taxation the United Kingdom has agreements with many countries to allow offset against United Kingdom tax what is deemed paid abroad. These deemed amounts paid abroad are not necessarily as much as actually paid.

Rental income on a property investment business (such as a buy to let property) is taxed as other savings income, after allowing deductions including mortgage interest. The mortgage does not need to be secured against the property receiving the rent, subject to a maximum of the purchase prices of the property investment business properties (or the market value at the time they transferred into the business). Joint owners can decide how they divide income and expenses, as long as one does not make a profit and the other a loss. Losses can be brought forward to subsequent years.

==== England, Wales and Northern Ireland ====
2021–2031
Rate	Dividend income	Savings income	Other income (inc. employment)	Tax bracket (of income above tax-free allowance)
Personal allowance	0% for £0–£500 (from 6 April 2024) then 8.75%	0%	0%	£0–£12,570
Basic rate	8.75%	20%	20%	£12,571–£50,270
Higher rate	33.75%	40%	40%	£50,271–£125,140
Additional rate	39.35%	45%	45%	£125,141 and over

This table reflects the removal of the 10% starting rate from April 2008, which also saw the 22% income tax rate drop to 20%. From April 2010, the Labour government introduced a 50% income tax rate for those earning more than £150,000. Income threshold for high taxation rate on income was decreased to £32,011 in 2013. The coalition government raised this allowance in years following 2014, and the 50% tax bracket was reduced to its current 45% rate.

==== Scotland ====
Since 2017 the Scottish Parliament has had the power to set the tax band thresholds (excluding the personal allowance) as well as the rates on all non-savings and non-dividend income of Scottish taxpayers.

2023–24
Rate	Income tax rate	Gross income
Starter rate	19%	£12,571† – £14,732
Basic rate	20%	£14,733 – £25,688
Intermediate rate	21%	£25,689 – £43,662
Higher rate	42%	£43,663 – £125,140 ††
Top rate	47%	Above £125,140 ††

†Assumes individuals are in receipt of the Standard UK Personal Allowance.

††Those earning more than £100,000 will see their Personal Allowance reduced by £1 for every £2 earned over £100,000.

==== Exemptions on investment ====
UK central government expenditure projection for tax year 2009–2010, according to the 2009 Pre-Budget Report

Certain investments carry a tax favoured status, including:

UK Government Bonds (gilts)
While all income is taxable, gains are exempt for income tax purposes.
National Savings and Investments
Certain investments via the state owned National Savings scheme are not subject to tax including Index linked Certificates (up to £15,000 per issue) and Premium Bonds, a scheme that issues monthly prizes in place of interest on individual holdings up to £50,000.
Individual Savings Accounts (ISAs)
Interest and dividends are paid tax free. There is no overall limit on how much a person can have invested in ISA accounts, but additional investments are currently limited to £20,000 per person per year, either in cash funds, mutual funds (Units Trusts and OEICs), or individual self-selected shares.
Pension funds
These have the same tax treatment as ISAs in terms of growth. Full tax relief is also given at the individual's marginal rate on contributions or, in the case of an employer contributions, it is treated as an expense and is not taxed on the employee as a benefit in kind. Aside from a tax free lump sum of 25% of the fund, benefits taken from pension funds are taxable.
Venture Capital Trusts
These are investments in smaller companies or funds of holdings in such companies over a minimum term of five years. These are not taxable and qualify for 30 per cent tax relief against an individual's income.
Enterprise Investment Schemes
A non-taxable investment into smaller company shares over three years that qualifies for 30 per cent tax relief. The facility also allows an individual to defer capital gains liabilities (these gains can be stripped out in future years using the annual CGT allowance).
Seed Enterprise Investment Schemes
A non-taxable investment into smaller company shares over three years that qualifies for 50 per cent tax relief. The facility also allows an individual to defer capital gains liabilities (these gains can be stripped out in future years using the annual CGT allowance).

- Insurance bonds

These include offshore and onshore investment bonds issued by insurance companies. The main difference between the two is that corporation tax paid by the onshore bond means that gains in the onshore bond are treated as if basic rate tax has been paid (this cannot be reclaimed by zero or starting rate tax payers). With both versions up to 5 per cent for each complete year of investment can be taken without an immediate tax liability (subject to a maximum total of 100 per cent of the original investment). On this basis, investors can plan an income stream while deferring any chargeable withdrawals until they are on a lower rate of tax, are no longer a United Kingdom resident, or their death.
Offshore trusts and companies
Trusts can be offshore if all trustees are non-resident. Such trusts can own foreign-operated companies. Corporation tax rates can be lower in some countries and where we still have double taxation treaties. However, since anti-avoidance rules have been introduced for taxation of trusts, these structures are not advantageous for someone who will remain resident.

==== Exceptions ====
Many holdings and income from them are exempt for "historical reasons". These include:

- Special tax arrangements for the British royal family include an inheritance tax exemption established in 1993. Prime Minister John Major announced in Parliament that "inheritance tax should apply to all bequests or gifts by the sovereign other than to transfers of assets from one sovereign to his or her successor", justified as necessary "in the unique circumstances of an hereditary monarchy". This arrangement is codified in the current Memorandum of Understanding on Royal Taxation (2023), which exempts sovereign-to-successor transfers from the standard 40% inheritance tax rate.
- Reduced income tax for special classes of person. For instance non-doms, who are resident in the United Kingdom but not "domiciled", are not subject to UK income tax on their non-UK income provided the remittance basis of taxation is claimed (or applies automatically) and the non-UK income is not remitted to the UK. After seven years of tax residence, the remittance basis can carry a substantial tax charge and UK residents will usually be deemed to be domiciled of the UK after fifteen years of residence without a gap of five years.
- An Act of Parliament to protect the Earl of Abingdon and his heirs and assignees from paying income tax on the tolls on the Swinford Toll Bridge.
- The income of charities is usually exempt from United Kingdom income tax.

=== Inheritance tax ===
Inheritance tax is levied on "transfers of value", meaning:

1. the estates of deceased persons;
2. gifts made within seven years of death (known as Potentially Exempt Transfers or "PETs");
3. "lifetime chargeable transfers", meaning transfers into certain types of trust. See Taxation of trusts (United Kingdom).

The Finance Act 2004 introduced an income tax regime known as "pre-owned asset tax" which aims to reduce the use of common methods of inheritance tax avoidance.

The first slice of cumulative transfers of value (known as the "nil rate band") is free of tax. This threshold is currently set at £325,000 (tax year 2012/13) and has recently failed to keep up with house price inflation with the result that some 6 million households currently fall within the scope of inheritance tax. Over this threshold the rate is 40 per cent on death or 36 per cent if the estate qualifies for a reduced rate as a result of a charitable donation.

Since October 2007, married couples and registered civil partners can effectively increase the threshold on their estate when the second partner dies – to as much as £650,000 in 2012–13. Their executors or personal representatives must transfer the first spouse or civil partner's unused Inheritance Tax threshold or 'nil rate band' to the second spouse or civil partner when they die.

Transfers of value between United Kingdom-domiciled spouses are exempt from tax. The Finance Act 2008 introduced transferable nil-rate band provisions through sections 8A-8C of the Inheritance Tax Act 1984, allowing the unused portion of a deceased spouse's or civil partner's inheritance tax allowance to be transferred to the surviving spouse. This effectively doubles the tax-free threshold to up to £650,000 for married couples (as of 2024–25). The provisions apply to deaths occurring on or after 9 October 2007, regardless of when the first spouse died. Prior to these changes, achieving similar tax efficiency required establishing discretionary trusts to preserve both spouses' nil-rate bands.

Gifts made more than seven years prior to death are not taxed; if they are made between three and seven years before death a tapered inheritance tax rate applies. There are some important exceptions to this treatment: the most important is the "reservation of benefit rule", which says that a gift is ineffective for inheritance tax purposes if the giver benefits from the asset in any way after the gift (for example, by gifting a house but continuing to live in it).

Inheritance Tax is not levied on the estate of persons who died "on active service" or from the effects of wounds sustained on such service...regardless of how long after that may be if it can be proven as the cause of death. In addition, the deceased's spouse is subject to an exemption, such that the full nil rate band is transferable to the surviving spouse's estate on the survivor's death.

=== Council Tax ===
Council tax is the system of local taxation used in England, Scotland and Wales to part fund the services provided by local government in each country. It was introduced in 1993 by the Local Government Finance Act 1992, as a successor to the unpopular Community Charge ("poll tax"), which had (briefly) replaced the Rates system. The basis for the tax is residential property, with discounts for single people.

As of 2008, the average annual levy on a property in England was £1,146. In 2006–2007 council tax in England amounted to £22.4 billion and an additional £10.8 billion in sales, fees and charges. In Scotland from April 2024, all but three of the Scottish local councils introduced a 100% "additional levy" on second homes.

In October 2024, local authorities in England had warned of a potential £54 billion funding shortfall due to rising costs in social care and school transport, according to a report from the County Councils Network (CCN). Over the next five years, councils faced significant financial challenges, with 83% of anticipated service cost increases attributed to adult social care, children's services, and home-to-school transport.

== Sales taxes and duties ==
=== Value added tax ===
The third largest source of government revenues is value added tax (VAT), charged at 20 per cent on supplies of goods and services. It is therefore a tax on consumer expenditure.

Certain goods and services are exempt from VAT, and others are subject to VAT at a lower rate of 5 per cent (the reduced rate, such as domestic gas supplies) or 0 per cent ("zero-rated", such as most food and children's clothing). Exemptions are intended to relieve the tax burden on essentials while placing the full tax on luxuries, but disputes based on fine distinctions arise, such as the "Jaffa Cake Case" which hinged on whether Jaffa Cakes were classed as (zero-rated) cakes—as was eventually decided—or (fully taxed) chocolate-covered biscuits. Until 2001, VAT was charged at the full rate on sanitary towels.

VAT was introduced in 1973, in consequence of Britain's entry to the European Economic Community, at a standard rate of 10 per cent. In July 1974, the standard rate became 8 per cent and from October that year petrol was taxed at a new higher rate of 25 per cent. In the budget of April 1975 the higher rate was extended to a wide range of "luxury" goods. In the budget of April 1976 the 25 per cent higher rate was reduced to 12.5 per cent. On 18 June 1979, the higher rate was scrapped and VAT set at a single rate of 15 per cent. In 1991 this became 17.5 per cent, though when domestic fuel and power was added to the scheme in 1994, it was charged at a new, lower rate of 8 per cent.

In September 1997 this lower rate of 8 per cent was reduced to 5 per cent and was extended to cover various energy-saving materials (from 1 July 1998), sanitary protection (from 1 January 2001), children's car seats (from 1 April 2001), conversion and renovation of certain residential properties (from 12 May 2001), contraceptives (from 1 July 2006) and smoking cessation products (from 1 July 2007).

On 1 December 2008, VAT was reduced to 15 per cent, as a reaction to the late-2000s recession, by Chancellor Alistair Darling.

On 1 January 2010, VAT returned to 17.5 per cent.

On 4 January 2011, VAT was raised to 20 per cent by Chancellor George Osborne, where it remains.

=== Excise duties ===
Excise duties are charged on, amongst other things, motor fuel, alcohol, tobacco, betting and vehicles.

=== Stamp duty ===
Stamp duty is charged on the transfer of shares and certain securities at a rate of 0.5 per cent. Modernised versions of stamp duty, stamp duty land tax and stamp duty reserve tax, are charged respectively on the transfer of real property and shares and securities, at rates of up to 4 per cent and 0.5 per cent respectively.

=== Motoring taxation ===
Motoring taxes include: fuel duty (which itself also attracts VAT), and Vehicle Excise Duty. Other fees and charges include the London congestion charge, various statutory fees including that for the compulsory vehicle test and that for vehicle registration, and in some areas on-street parking (as well as associated charges for violations).

== Business taxes ==
=== Corporate Tax ===
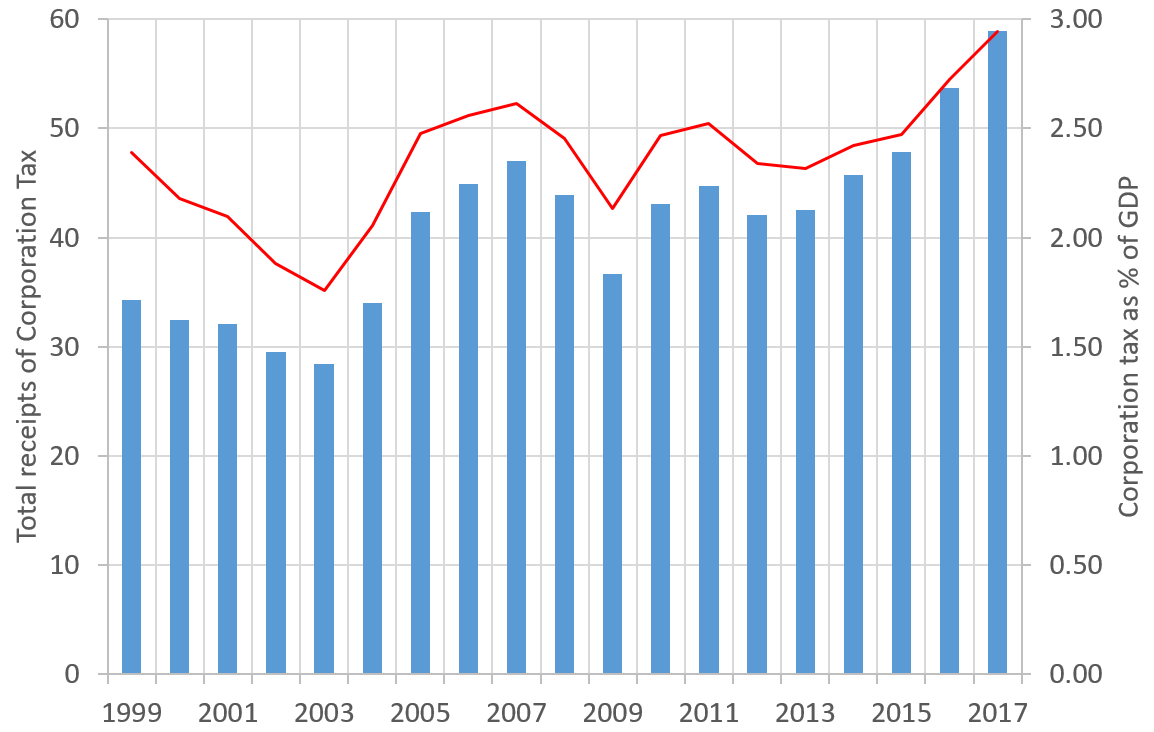
UK Corporation Tax Receipts from 1999 to 2017, both in absolute terms and as % of GDP

Corporation tax is a tax levied in the United Kingdom on the profits made by companies and on the profits of permanent establishments of non-UK resident companies and associations that trade in the EU.

Corporation tax forms the fourth-largest source of government revenue (after income, NIC, and VAT). Prior to the tax's enactment on 1 April 1965, companies and individuals paid the same income tax, with an additional profits tax levied on companies. The Finance Act 1965 replaced this structure for companies and associations with a single corporate tax, which borrowed its basic structure and rules from the income tax system. Since 1997, the United Kingdom's Tax Law Rewrite Project has been modernising the United Kingdom's tax legislation, starting with income tax, while the legislation imposing corporation tax has itself been amended; the rules governing income tax and corporation tax have thus diverged.

=== Business rates ===
Business rates is the commonly used name of non-domestic rates, a rate or tax charged to occupiers of non-domestic property. Business rates form part of the funding for local government, and are collected by them, but rather than receipts being retained directly they are pooled centrally and then redistributed.

Business rates were introduced in England and Wales in 1990 and are a modernised version of a system of rating that dates back to the Poor Relief Act 1601. As such, business rates retain many previous features from, and follow some case law of, older forms of rating.

In 2005–06, £19.9 billion was collected in business rates, representing 4.35 per cent of the total United Kingdom tax income.

Business rates are a property tax, where each non-domestic property is assessed with a rateable value, expressed in pounds. The rateable value broadly represents the annual rent the property could have been let for on a particular valuation date according to a set of assumptions. The actual bill payable is then calculated using a multiplier set by central government, and applying any reliefs.

=== Plastic packaging tax ===
The UK's Plastic Packaging Tax was introduced on 1 April 2022. It applies to plastic packaging manufactured in or imported into the UK that contains less than 30% recycled plastic and is predominantly plastic by weight. The tax also applies to imported packaging whether it is filled or unfilled. Packaging containing at least 30% recycled plastic or that is not predominantly plastic by weight is exempt, and also packaging for human medicinal products is exempt.

The tax was first proposed in 2018 following a 2017 call for evidence on reducing single-use plastic waste. Legislation was enacted through the Finance Act 2021 after multiple consultations. Supporting legislation is set out in:

- The Plastic Packaging Tax (Descriptions of Products) Regulations 2021, and
- The Plastic Packaging Tax (General) Regulations 2022.

The policy's stated aim is to encourage the use of recycled plastic in packaging. Environmental modelling suggests the tax may lead to an increase in the use of recycled plastic in packaging and reductions in associated carbon emissions, though the degree of behavioural change is uncertain. Those likely to be affected include UK manufacturers and importers of plastic packaging, their business customers, and potentially consumers. However, businesses handling less than 10 tonnes of plastic packaging annually are exempt from the tax to reduce administrative burden.

== Business and personal taxes ==
Some taxes are, depending on the circumstances, paid by both individuals and companies, and government

=== National Insurance contributions ===
The second largest source of government revenue is National Insurance contributions (NICs). NICs are payable by employees, employers and the self-employed and in the 2010–2011 tax year £96.5 billion was raised, 21.5 per cent of the total collected by HMRC.

Employees and employers pay contributions according to a complex classification based on employment type and income. Class 1 (employed persons) NIC is charged at several rates depending on various income thresholds and a number of other factors including age, the type of occupational pension scheme contributed to by the employee and/or employer and whether or not the employee is an ocean-going mariner. Certain married women who opted to pay reduced contributions (in return for reduced benefits) prior to 1977 retain this right for historical reasons.

Employers also pay contributions on many benefits in kind provided to employees (such as company cars) and on tax liabilities met on behalf of employees via a "PAYE Settlement Agreement".

There are separate arrangements for self-employed persons, who are normally liable to Class 2 flat rate NIC and Class 4 earnings-related NIC, and for some voluntary sector workers.

=== Health and social care levy ===
On 7 September 2021, Prime Minister Boris Johnson announced that a new tax would be introduced from April 2023 in order to fund the National Health Service backlogs arising as a result of the COVID-19 pandemic and the reform of social care in England. The tax would have a similar application to NICs and will be charged to both employees and employers at a rate of 1.25% on an individual's earnings. However, it would also be payable beyond State Pension Age, which is not the case for NICs. From April 2022 to March 2023, the 1.25% increase would temporarily apply to NICs. The aim was to give HMRC time to make the changes required in order for the levy to be introduced. The Truss ministry reversed the implementation of this tax and reverted the NICs as of 6 November 2022.

=== Capital gains tax ===
Capital gains tax (CGT) is charged on gains arising from the disposal of certain assets by individuals, trustees and personal representatives. A gain is generally calculated as the difference between the value received for an asset and its acquisition cost, after allowable costs, losses and reliefs are taken into account.

For the 2026–27 tax year, individuals generally pay CGT at 18% on gains falling within the basic-rate income tax band and 24% on gains above it. The annual exempt amount is £3,000 for most individuals. Gains qualifying for Business Asset Disposal Relief or Investors' Relief are taxed at 18%.

Companies generally do not pay CGT directly; instead, chargeable gains are included in profits subject to corporation tax. Companies may receive indexation allowance for assets held before December 2017, but the allowance has been frozen at December 2017 values since January 2018.

Transfers of assets between spouses or civil partners who are living together are generally treated as giving rise to neither a gain nor a loss.

== Tax gap ==
The 'tax gap' is the difference between the amount of tax that should, in theory, be collected by HMRC, against what is actually collected. The tax gap for the UK in 2013–14 was £34 billion, or 6.4 per cent of total tax liabilities. It can be broken down by tax type and behaviour:

Tax	Amount
Income Tax, National Insurance and Capital Gains Tax	£14.0 billion
VAT	£13.1 billion
Corporation Tax	£3.0 billion
Excise duties	£2.7 billion

Behaviour	Amount
Hidden economy	£6.2 billion
Criminal attacks	£5.1 billion
Legal interpretation	£4.9 billion
Evasion	£4.4 billion
Failure to take reasonable care	£3.9 billion
Avoidance	£2.6 billion
Total loss	£27.1 billion

== See also ==
=== UK-related ===
- HM Revenue & Customs
- Chartered Institute of Taxation
- Government spending in the United Kingdom
- Institute of Indirect Taxation
- Income in the United Kingdom
- Tax credit
- Starting rate of UK income tax
- Economic history of the United Kingdom
- History of taxation in the United Kingdom
  - Why the United Kingdom income tax year begins on 6 April
- History of inheritance taxes in the United Kingdom

=== Local taxation ===
- Business rates
- Council tax
- Local income tax

=== General category ===
- Tax
- Tax haven
- Tax law
