= Taxation of trusts (United Kingdom) =

The taxation of trusts in the United Kingdom is governed by a different set of principles to those tax laws which apply to individuals or companies.

== Inheritance tax ==
The inheritance tax ("IHT") treatment of trusts was substantially revised by the Finance Act 2006, with effect from 22 March 2006. The possible types of trust which can now exist for inheritance tax purposes are set out in the table below:

Name	Defining features	Tax treatment
Bare trust	Not a true trust: beneficiary is absolutely entitled to the income and capital.	No tax on the trustees. Beneficiary taxed in all respects as if the assets are his or her own, personally.
Charity	Trust for wholly charitable purposes.	Inheritance tax free.
Pre-existing interest-in-possession trust	The current interest-in-possession existed at 22 March 2006.	Interest-in-possession treatment (see below).
Pre-existing accumulation and maintenance trust	Trust was an accumulation and maintenance trust under the old rules (not explained on this page: broadly speaking, trusts for beneficiaries under 25) at 22 March 2006.	Creation no longer possible. No ten-year charges or exit charges until 6 April 2008. May already fulfil the definition of an 18–25 Trust, or may (if its terms allow) be amended to so as to fulfil that definition before 6 April 2008. If so, taxed as an 18–25 Trust from that date. If not, taxed as a relevant property trust from that date.
Trust for bereaved minor	Created in the will of the parent of the beneficiary concerned, who must be absolutely entitled on or before age 18.	Tax as normal on creation (can only be created by will, therefore taxed as part of the settlor's death estate). No ten-year charges or exit charges.
18–25 trust	Created either by amendment to an existing accumulation and maintenance trust, or in the will of the parent of the beneficiary concerned, who must be absolutely entitled on or before age 25.	Tax as normal on creation (new ones can only be created by will, therefore taxed as part of the settlor's death estate). Trust becomes a relevant property trust (see below) upon the beneficiary attaining 18 (therefore a maximum exit charge of 7/10ths of 6% = 4.2% where the beneficiary becomes entitled at 25).
Immediate post-death interest	An interest-in-possession trust, created by a will and taking effect immediately upon the death.	Interest-in-possession treatment (see below). Spouse exemption available if the interest-in-possession beneficiary is a spouse or civil partner of the deceased.
Transitional serial interest	Various situations where a pre-existing interest-in-possession trust has terminated in favour of a new interest-in-possession.	Interest-in-possession treatment (see below). Spouse exemption available if the new interest-in-possession beneficiary is a spouse or civil partner of the previous interest-in-possession beneficiary.
Disabled trust	Certain trusts for the benefit of a beneficiary with a disability.	Interest-in-possession treatment (see below).
Relevant property trust	Any trust not falling into another category, above. Prior to March 2006 this treatment applied mainly to discretionary trusts.	Relevant property trust treatment (see below).

Notes:

1. An "interest-in-possession" means that a specific beneficiary has a right to the current income of the trust.
2. The spouse exemption exempts from tax any assets passing between spouses and civil partners.

Relevant property trusts are taxed:

- On creation:
  - If the trust is created inter vivos (i.e. during the settlor's lifetime):
    - It is taxed at half of the current death rate for IHT. The death rate is 40%, and the 2012/13 IHT "nil-band" is £325,000. Therefore, if the settlor has made no gifts and settled no trusts in the seven years prior to settling a trust in 2012/13, it would be taxed at nil rate (0%) on the first £325,000 and 20% on the balance.
    - If the settlor dies within seven years of the settlement, the initial 20% charge will be recalculated as if it were a PET, and if that is more than the tax already paid, the balance will be due (but there is no repayment if the recalculation produces a lower result).
  - If the trust is created on death (i.e. a testamentary trust) it will usually suffer IHT at creation under the normal rules, because of the death. There is therefore no need for the trust to be taxed separately on creation.
- To "ten-year charges", on each tenth anniversary of the settlement (or of the date of death, in the case of a testamentary trust). The rate is 6% on the value of the trust's assets exceeding the nil-band at that time.
- To "exit charges" when money leaves the trust: most usually by appointment to a beneficiary. Simplifying a little, the rate of IHT is that proportion of what the next ten-year charge would have been, that the time which has elapsed since creation or the last ten-year charge bears to ten years.

The interest-in-possession treatment, since 2006, applies only to some trusts with an interest-in-possession (as defined above). Where it applies, such trusts are taxed by attributing the trust's value to the beneficiary who is currently entitled to the income. Accordingly:

- On creation:
  - In the rare cases where they can be created in lifetime they are taxed as PETs.
  - They are taxed as part of the death estate, when created by will. A spouse exemption is available where the interest-in-possession beneficiary is a spouse or civil partner of the deceased.
- On termination (i.e. termination of the interest-in-possession, which may, or may not, be the termination of the trust):
  - The value of the trust's assets is taxed at death rates upon the death of the interest-in-possession beneficiary. It aggregates with that beneficiary's estate, and the trust and the estate share the nil-band between them, in proportion to their values.
  - The value of the trust's assets is taxed as if it were a "PET" where the beneficiary's right to receive income ceases in his or her lifetime.

== Case law ==
- Inland Revenue Commissioners v Willoughby [1997] 1 WLR 1071
- Inland Revenue Commissioners v Duke of Westminster [1936] AC 1, 19
- Furniss v Dawson [1984] 1 AC 474, 526
- MacNiven v Westmorelands Investments Ltd [2001] UKHL 6, [2003] 1 AC 311, 327, Lord Hoffmann
- Williams v Singer [1921] 1 AC 65, on income tax

== See also ==
- English trust law
- UK pension law
- Capital gains tax
- Inheritance Tax Act 1984
- Inheritance Tax (United Kingdom)
- Offshore trust
- Real estate investment trust
