= Extra-statutory concession =

United Kingdom tax law concept

An extra-statutory concession (or ESC) is a concept under United Kingdom tax law whereby HM Revenue and Customs grants certain concessions to taxpayers to mitigate their tax liabilities even though the relevant allowances would not strictly be allowed under the terms of the tax legislation.

A commonly cited example is that luncheon vouchers are subject to an income tax concession of up to 15p per day under an extra statutory concession.

Although they do not form part of either primary or subsidiary legislation, extra-statutory concessions are highly formalised, and are indirectly enforceable by means of judicial review. Statutory concessions are formally categorised and published under reference numbers (see for example ESC C16). By convention HMRC publishes a full list of extra statutory concessions on the first day of each UK tax year.

== See also ==
- Tax holiday
