= Michael Schrodi =

German politician

Member of the Bundestag
- Incumbent
- Assumed office 2017

Personal details
- Born: 3 July 1977 (age 49) Munich, West Germany (now Germany)
- Party: SPD
- Education: LMU Munich

Michael Schrodi (born 3 July 1977) is a German teacher and politician of the Social Democratic Party (SPD) who has been serving as a member of the Bundestag from the state of Bavaria since 2017.

In addition to his parliamentary work, Schrodi has been serving as a Parliamentary State Secretary at the Federal Ministry of Finance in the government of Chancellor Friedrich Merz since 2025.

== Political career ==
Schrodi became a member of the Bundestag in the 2017 German federal election. He is a member of the Finance Committee and the Committee on the Environment, Nature Conservation and Nuclear Safety. On the Finance Committee, he served as his parliamentary group's rapporteur on excise taxes, taxes on tobacco and the so-called Abgeltungsteuer. He was also his group’s spokesperson for distributive justice (2019–2021) and financial policies (2021–2025).

In addition to his committee assignments, Schrodi is part of the German-Irish Parliamentary Friendship Group.

Within the SPD parliamentary group, Schrodi belongs to the Parliamentary Left, a left-wing movement.

In the negotiations to form a so-called traffic light coalition of the SPD, the Green Party and the Free Democratic Party (FDP) following the 2021 federal elections, Schrodi was part of his party's delegation in the working group on financial regulation and the national budget, co-chaired by Doris Ahnen, Lisa Paus and Christian Dürr. In the negotiations to form a Grand Coalition under the leadership of Friedrich Merz's Christian Democrats (CDU together with the Bavarian CSU) and the SPD following the 2025 German elections, he was part of the SPD delegation in the same working group, this time led by Mathias Middelberg, Florian Oßner and Dennis Rohde.

== Other activities ==
- Education and Science Workers' Union (GEW) – member
