= Schedular system of taxation =

The schedular system of taxation is the system of how the charge to United Kingdom corporation tax is applied. It also applied to United Kingdom income tax before legislation was rewritten by the Tax Law Rewrite Project. Similar systems apply in other jurisdictions that are or were closely related to the United Kingdom, such as Ireland and Jersey.

The levies to tax on income were originally set out in Schedules to the Income Tax Act. In the case of United Kingdom corporation tax, they remain for companies charged to that tax, and in the case of United Kingdom income tax, many, but not all remain.

In the United Kingdom the source rule applies. This means that something is taxed only if there is a specific provision bringing it within the charge to tax. Accordingly, profits are only charged to corporation tax if they fall within one of the following, and are not otherwise exempted by an explicit provision of the Taxes Acts:

== The Schedules ==
	Scope
Schedule A	Income from UK land
Schedule D	Taxable income not falling within another Schedule
Schedule F	Income from UK dividends
Chargeable gains	Gains as defined by legislation that are not taxed as income
CFC charge	Profits made by controlled foreign companies where no exemption applies

Notes:

1. The heads of charge listed above are mutually exclusive. No income or gain can fall within more than one head of charge.
2. In practice companies do not get taxed under Schedule F. Most companies are exempted from Schedule F and there is a provision for those companies which are taxed on UK dividends (i.e. dealers in shares (stock)) that removes the charge from Schedule F to Schedule D.
3. A controlled foreign company ("CFC") is a company controlled by a UK resident that is not itself UK resident and is subject to a lower rate of tax in the territory in which it is resident. Under certain circumstances, UK resident companies that control a CFC pay corporation tax on what the UK tax profits of that CFC would have been. However, because of a wide range of exemptions, very few companies suffer a CFC charge.
4. There used to be a Schedule B and a Schedule C that applied to companies, but these have now been merged with Schedule D. Schedule E, which was repealed in 2003, only applied to individuals.
5. Authorised unit trusts are not liable to tax on their chargeable gains.

=== History ===
Income tax was levied under 5 schedules - income not falling within those schedules was not taxed. The schedules were:

- Schedule A (tax on income from UK land)
- Schedule B (tax on commercial occupation of land)
- Schedule C (tax on income from public securities)
- Schedule D (tax on trading income, income from professions and vocations, interest, overseas income and casual income)
- Schedule E (tax on employment income)

Later a sixth Schedule, Schedule F (tax on UK dividend income) was added.

The Schedules under which tax is levied have changed. Schedule B was abolished in 1988, Schedule C in 1996 and Schedule E in 2003. For income tax purposes, the remaining Schedules were abolished in 2005. Schedules A, D and F remain for corporation tax purposes.

=== Cases of Schedule D ===
Schedule D is itself divided into a number of cases:

	Scope
Case I	Profits from trades, including farming
Case II	Profits from professions and vocations
Case III	Interest and annual payments etc., not taxed at source
Case IV	Income from overseas securities (debentures, mortgages etc.)
Case V	Income from overseas possessions (property, shares etc.)
Case VI	Miscellaneous profits not otherwise chargeable under Schedule D or any other Schedule (e.g. income from furnished lettings)

Notes:

1. Income can fall within more than one of Case I, III and V. Where this happens, the income is only taxed under one of the Cases. The HM Revenue and Customs (the UK taxing authority) decides which Case will be applied.
2. Where interest-type income and gains.losses on loans, derivatives, financial instruments and intangibles relate to a trade, they fall within Case I not Case III. The one exception to this is life assurance companies taxed on the I minus E basis, where they always fall within Case III. Overseas interest-type income, etc. falls within Case I or III, as appropriate, and never under Case V.
3. There was a Case II, which applied to income from professions and vocations. It is not believed that a company within the charge to corporation tax can have such income and consequently Case II was effectively abolished when income tax stopped being treated on a schedular basis.
4. There used to be Cases IV, VII and VIII, but these have all been abolished.

=== Relief for expenses ===
The computations of income and taxable chargeable gains include deductions for direct expenses. However, not all sources of income have direct expenses (particularly those falling within Cases III and VI of Schedule D, foreign dividend income falling within Case V and income falling within Schedule F). Also a company may incur expenses managing a subsidiary which does not tend to pay dividend income to it.

Relief is therefore given for management expenses incurred by a company with investment business (before 1 April 2003 investment companies), and for certain management expenses of a life assurance company taxed on the I minus E basis. Relief is also given as a deduction from profits chargeable to corporation tax to certain payments to charities, certain royalty payments made by non-traders and some manufactured overseas dividends.

=== Case I of Schedule D and Schedule A ===
Subject to specific statute or case law to the contrary, Case I of Schedule D and Schedule A profits are based on profits as calculated using UK Generally Accepted Accounting Practice. The same is true for the deduction for management expenses that are available to companies with investment business. Where a company prepares its accounts under International Financial Reporting Standards, it will use profits computed on that basis instead from 2005 onwards, subject to specific statute or case law to the contrary.

The main exceptions to this rule are that no deductions are allowed under Case I of Schedule D (or Schedule A) for expenses not incurred wholly and exclusively for the trade (or rental business) and that no deductions are available for capital (i.e. deductions are only available for revenue items).

In recent publications, the HM Revenue and Customs has split the various exceptions to the "follow the accounts" rule up into 11 somewhat arbitrary categories, of which 1 is the miscellaneous residual category. The other ten are

- Public policy
- Transfer pricing
- Structural
- Avoidance
- Tax neutrality
- Capital items
- Fiscal incentives
- Symmetry
- Realisability and Tax capacity
- "True reflection"

==== Tax depreciation ====
Since no capital deductions are allowed, depreciation on capital assets is not tax-deductible, although tax depreciation, known as "capital allowances" is available instead for expenditure on some capital assets. Capital allowances are given by the Capital Allowances Act 2001 (CAA 2001). Note that expenditure on finance leases (as opposed to, say, lease or hire purchase agreements) is considered to be revenue. Therefore interest payments and depreciation on finance leases is deductible. If the finance lessor owns the asset, however, it may be able to make a claim for capital allowances.

There are various types of capital allowances. By far the most common type of allowance is plant and machinery allowances. "Machinery" takes its normal meaning. "Plant" has no statutory definition, although the legislation does designate a few assets as plant (e.g. "integral features", expenditure on safety at sports grounds and personal security assets) and also defines what cannot be plant (called "buildings" and "structures"). Plant is defined by more than 100 years of case law. It is in essence business 'apparatus', which can in practice include many fixtures and fittings in buildings .

Plant and machinery allowances conventionally gave a 25% reducing balance basis annual 'writing down allowance' (WDA). The 25% WDA was reduced to 20% from April 2008. This means that if a plant asset, say, was bought for £400 in year 1, 20% of £400 (i.e. £80) would be deductible from taxable profits as tax depreciation in year 1. Then 20% of £(400-80) (i.e. £64) would be deductible in year 2, and so on. The 20% figure is reduced to 10% for certain 'special rate' assets. These include "integral features" (electrical systems; cold water systems; heating, hot water, ventilating and air conditioning systems; lifts, escalators and moving walkways; and external solar shading), "long-life assets" (plant and machinery with an expected life when new of 25 years or more - subject to various exemptions, i.e. assets in offices and retail shops), and the addition of thermal insulation to existing buildings. From April 2008 the first £50,000 of expenditure on plant and machinery each year may be written off in that year (called an "Annual Investment Allowance"). There are also 100% first year capital allowances for expenditure on energy-saving and environmentally beneficial (i.e. water conserving) plant and machinery (called "Enhanced Capital Allowances").

Capital allowances were also given at 4% straight-line for expenditure on industrial and agricultural buildings. However, these allowances are being phased out by April 2011 by reducing the rate of WDA by one-quarter each year, so that broadly the rate will reduce to 3% from April 2008, 2% from April 2009, 1% from April 2010 and nothing from April 2011. Industrial buildings are those in use for various purposes including manufacturing, processing and some storage etc. They are also available for qualifying hotels (those with at least 10 letting bedrooms and meeting other conditions) and commercial buildings in specially designated areas of need, called "enterprise zones" (which qualify for a 100% initial allowance, but will also be withdrawn from April 2011).

Tax depreciation is also potentially available for expenditure on: business premises renovation (100% initial allowance), flat conversions (100% initial allowance), research and development (100% initial allowance), mineral extraction (10% or 25% WDAs), know-how (25% WDA), patents (25% WDA), dredging and assured tenancies. Expenditure on cleaning-up contaminated land and buildings may qualify for 150% "land remediation relief" and adding thermal insulation to residential properties may qualify for a "landlord's energy saving allowance", giving a £1,500 deduction per dwelling.

Although specific rules vary by country, tax depreciation is generally not available for expenditure on land, abortive expenditure, expenditure which does not give rise to a capital asset, and is limited for depreciation on buildings.

==== Tonnage tax ====
For shipping companies, another rule can also apply: the so-called Tonnage tax. Shipping companies may elect to compute their Case I profits using a formula based on tonnage rather than fiscally adjusted accounting profit.

=== Case III of Schedule D ===
Gains and losses on loans, derivatives, financial instruments and intangibles are taxed as well as income. The basic rule for calculating Case III profits is to follow the accounts, although there are detailed anti-avoidance rules to stop the most obvious abuses. Only direct expenses, such as costs incurred in obtaining a loan, are deductible in the Case III computation. If the result is negative, Case III profits are taken as nil, with the negative result being treated as non-trading debits. Similar calculation rules apply to loans, derivatives, financial instruments and intangibles that are taxed under Case I (although losses are treated as a Case I expense rather than non-trading debits).

=== Case V of Schedule D ===
Overseas property income and income of a wholly overseas trade are calculated in the same way as Schedule A and Case I of Schedule D income respectively. Overseas dividend income is usually accounted for and taxed on a receipts basis. Double tax relief (see below) may be available where the overseas income has suffered foreign tax.

=== Case VI of Schedule D ===
Where the Case VI charge relates to casual annual income, it is usually taxed on a cash basis, though usually the HM Revenue and Customs will accept an accruals basis. Relief is usually available for direct expenses if they would have been allowable in a Case I computation.

=== Chargeable gains ===
Chargeable gains (or allowable losses) are calculated as gross proceeds, less direct selling costs, less base cost, less indexation allowance. Indexation allowance is base cost multiplied by the change in the Retail Prices Index movement between the month of purchase and month of sale. Indexation allowance cannot create or increase a loss. Losses may only be set off against chargeable gains of the same or a future accounting period (except certain allowable losses of life assurance companies (see: I minus E basis).

The UK operates a participation exemption called the "substantial shareholding exemption". Assuming all the relevant entities or groups are trading companies and groups, if a company together with its fellow group companies has a shareholding of over 10% in another company, and has held those shares for more than twelve months, disposals of those shares are exempt from chargeable gains. The figure of 10% is increased to 30% for shares held by the long-term insurance fund of a life assurance company. The detailed rules, however, are complex, and companies need to study them closely to see whether the substantial shareholding exemption applies.

There are also other exemptions and holdover and rollover reliefs that apply: for example, where a business property is sold and a new business property is acquired with the proceeds, no chargeable gain will immediately arise. These are such that most companies will only rarely have a chargeable gain. The main exception being life assurance companies taxed on the I minus E basis: these companies pay the bulk of the tax paid on chargeable gains.

=== Controlled foreign company (CFC) charge ===
In addition to being taxed on its own profits, a UK company may be taxed on the profits from a controlled foreign company (CFC) in which it has an interest. This is an anti-avoidance provision. There is a wide range of exemptions, and usually groups arrange their affairs so a CFC charge does not arise. When it does arise it is equal to what the overseas company's UK taxable profits would have been on the assumption that the overseas company is UK resident, and ignoring chargeable gains. Relief is available for UK tax paid on dividends received from a CFC where a CFC charge is or was payable and for overseas tax suffered.
