= Substantial shareholdings exemption =

United Kingdom tax relief relating to capital gains on shares

The substantial shareholdings exemption is an exemption from assessment of capital gains under corporation tax applicable to United Kingdom companies. The exemption is found in Schedule 7AC of the Taxation of Chargeable Gains Act 1992.

The rationale for the exemption is that groups of companies should be able to restructure without having to concern themselves with taxation of capital gains.

Other European jurisdictions apply a more comprehensive system. For example, in Luxembourg and the Netherlands as well as in Germany and Belgium, both capital gains derived from, as well as dividend income earned on, qualifying shares are (mostly) exempt from further local taxation. These comprehensive systems are generally referred to as participation exemption systems.

== Eligibility ==
To qualify for the exemption, a disposal must meet all of the following criteria:

- The disposing company must dispose of shares or an interest in shares of another company.
- The company must have held a "substantial shareholding" in the other company for a continuous period of at least 12 months in the preceding two years. This will be extended to the preceding six years for disposals on or after 1 April 2017. A substantial shareholding means a shareholding in respect of which the following conditions are met:
  - The disposing company holds at least 10% of the ordinary share capital of the other company;
  - The disposing company is entitled to at least 10% of profits available for distribution; and
  - The disposing company would be entitled to at least 10% of the other company's assets on a liquidation.
- The disposing company must be a trading company or a member of a trading group. This requirement does not apply for disposals on or after 1 April 2017
- The target company (or the company whose shares are being disposed of) must be a trading company or the holding company of a trading group.

The last two conditions must be met:

- throughout the period:
  - beginning at the same time as the 12-month period referred to in the first condition begins, and
  - ending at the time of the disposal; and
- immediately after the disposal.

== Applicability ==
The exemption only applies to disposals of shares made on or after 1 April 2002. The relief is automatic, meaning that a company does not have to submit a claim to Her Majesty's Revenue and Customs.

== See also ==
- Taxation of Chargeable Gains Act 1992
- United Kingdom corporation tax
