= Abgeltungsteuer =

Flat tax on private income from capital

The Abgeltungsteuer (German, from Abgeltung "settlement", "discharge" + Steuer "tax") is a flat tax on private income from capital. It is used in Germany, Austria, and Luxembourg.

== Germany ==
In Germany, the Abgeltungsteuer was introduced through the German Corporate Tax Reform Act of 2008 that passed the German Parliament on 14 August 2007. The Abgeltungsteuer became effective on 1 January 2009.

=== Earlier tax law ===
In 2009 the Abgeltungsteuer replaced the half revenue procedure that had been effective since 2001.

The German Income Tax Act had a procedure whereby taxable income was halved for purposes of dividend taxation. Fifty percent of income, as defined in article 3 number 40 of the Tax Act as amended in 2008, was exempt from income tax. Dividends and taxable capital gains from the sale of investments were taxed (if a certain exemption limit was exceeded) at only half the rate of income tax and solidarity surcharge tax. Profits from the sale of equity investments were not taxable if they were held for over a year.

The half revenue procedure was moot as of 1 January 2009 with the passage of the new Abgeltungsteuer (Article 32 of the German Income Tax Act).

=== Who is liable ===
The taxation at the level of a shareholder (shareholders or partners) depends on whether the shareholder is an individual or a corporation:

- If the shareholder is an individual, the distribution as dividend falls under the Abgeltungsteuer with a flat rate of 25 % plus a 5.5 % solidarity surcharge.

- If the shareholder is a partnership, dividends and taxable capital gains from equity investments are 40 % exempt from taxation. (Art. 3 No. 40 German Income Tax Act as amended of 2009). This is called the partial income method and replaced the half revenue procedure for shareholders of partnerships. Accordingly, income from dividends and capital from the sale of company shares that are held as business assets are no longer subject to 50 % taxation (half income method) but now taxed with 60 % of the individual income tax rate. The revenue-related expenses can also be considered tax deductible of 60 %.

- If the shareholder is a corporation, dividends and taxable capital gains from equity investments are exempt from taxation (Art. 8 b Para. 1 German Corporation Tax Act). In its tax assessment, merely 5 % of the dividends are added to profits as non-deductible operating expenses (Art. 8 b Para. 5 German Corporation Tax Act).

=== Amount of withholding tax ===
The Abgeltungsteuer is levied as a withholding tax. Private investor’s tax liability is settled. The already taxed capital gains are no longer recorded in the annual income tax return. Instead of taxing with the personal tax rate of taxpayers, their income regardless of their height is taxed with the flat tax rate of 25%. The legal basis for this was amended in the Unternehmensteuerreformgesetz of 2008 in Art. 32 d of the German Income Tax Act. The withholding tax rate according to Art. 43 a Para. 1 German Income Tax Act is 25% plus solidarity surcharge of 5.5% on the final withholding tax and possible church tax (8 or 9% of the flat tax). This makes a total of Abgeltungsteuer of 26.375% church tax excluded. The surplus income from capital assets cannot be shortened by the overall deductions through lump sum or actual expenses. In their place, the saver's allowance in the amount of 801 € will be used as deduction (Art. 20 Para. 9 German Income Tax Act). However actually there are several decisions in court to rule on that restricted deduction possibility.

=== What is taxable ===
==== Taxable current income ====
Among the investment income are (Art. 20 Para. 1 German Income Tax Act):

- dividends
- interests
- income from investment funds and certificates
- nearly all earnings from capital assets
- private capital gains
- covered options and other payments from securities and derivatives

This means, profits which have been recorded and taxed only in the context of speculation are now already taxable for a holding period of more than one year.

==== Taxable private capital gains ====
Taxable private capital gains are (Art. 20 Para. 2 German Income Tax Act):

- the sale of shares of a corporation (stock or share of business)
- the sale of coupons (dividends or interest)
- the profit of forward transactions
- the sale of a stake on a company or a quiet participating loan
- the transfer of rights on mortgages, mortgages and pensions
- the sale of a capital life insurance and
- the sale of other capital assets or a position of right

=== Exemptions from the tax deduction ===
The rules for the Abgeltungsteuer do not apply for the following:

- interest payments by corporations to shareholders with a participation of 10% or more, for back to back financing and loans between related parties. In those cases the earnings will be taxed with the individual tax rate.

- gains from sale of shares in corporations, if the seller has been involved within the last five years at least with 1% of the capital. The income from business operations are subject to corporation tax and are taxed with the partial income method.

- capital gains incurred in the course of a business activity.

- at request for capital gains from investments in a corporation. The participation must be at least 25%, in professional work for the corporation 1% is enough. The request applies for the following four tax years unless it is revoked. After withdrawal of the application a new application for the same stake in the corporation is no longer possible. Upon successful application the partial income method applies.

=== Alternatives ===
Investment income upon which flat rate tax was withheld do not have to be declared in the annual income tax return. Only if church tax has not been withheld or the personal income tax rate is below 25%. A tax refund on the difference between the tax rates is possible (Art. 32 Para. 6 German Income Tax Act). This makes sense when the personal tax rate of the income is below 25%. The intention was that the income on investment income will not be taxed higher than their other income. A withdrawal of actual costs associated with private capital gains is however no longer permitted, the saver's allowance in the amount of 801 € will be used as deduction.

=== Losses ===
Losses are considered as follows:

At first, positive and negative income will be charged. (e.g. dividends, interests income from investment funds and certificates). Losses from sale of shares can only be charged against gains from selling shares. Any remaining loss is carried forward by the bank on either next year or, at request of the customer be certified and may be used by other banks where the individual has positive investment income. Losses that occurred before 2009 can be charged up to 2013 with capital income.

=== Foreign investment income ===
Investment income that was generated abroad also falls under the Abgeltungsteuer. The Federal Republic of Germany concluded with many countries double taxation agreements so that the regulations differ from each country to country. The aim is to avoid that one taxpayer is charged with similar taxes more than once on the same income for the same period. Though the Abgeltungsteuer is not applicable in foreign countries, the taxpayer has the responsibility to declare the income for taxation at the local tax office. Foreign taxes on capital gains are only chargeable up to a height of 25% according to German Income Tax Act (Art. 43 a Para. 3). Nevertheless, there can be possibility that losses from other securities transactions are added to the original loss. That leads to a paid tax on capital gains of more than 25% seen over the entire calendar year. Such a negative surplus will not been refunded by the tax authorities and is also not transferable to the following years.

=== Advantages and disadvantages ===
- Taxpayers with middle and higher income who mainly receive income from capital gains have usually an advantage from this new method of taxation. The reason is the low flat rate of 25% instead of being taxed with the personal income tax rate. In Germany the highest personal income tax rate is 45%. Taxpayers with a small income have no disadvantage because of the alternative of being taxed with their personal income tax rate (see above). The lowest income tax rate starts at 14%.
- Another advantage or disadvantage depending on the view is the taxation of the sale of capital gains. Equity and investments funds are getting more unattractive through this kind of taxation. That only counts for new investments that were bought from 1 January 2009 on. All shares that were bought before that date do not fall under the new Abgeltungsteuer and are tax free when they were held more than 12 months.
- The flat rate tax rate of 25% is significantly lower than the highest income tax rate. Advantages only apply for investors whose marginal tax rate on the remaining income is equal or higher than the flat tax rate. There might be a breach of the principle of taxation based upon the competitiveness of the taxpayers. Before 2009 gains from capital income were taxed with 45% and from 2009 on are taxed with 25% plus 5.5% solidarity surcharge and church tax. That is the same for taxpayers with a personal income tax rate of 27%.
- The Abgeltungsteuer on capital gains leads to different taxation in comparison to the other income taxes that are based upon the personal tax rate (so called dualistic income taxation).

== Austria ==
In Austria, a withholding tax on capital income took effect on 1 January 1993. The legal basis for the tax is the Austrian final taxation law (Endbesteuerungsgesetz).

== Luxembourg ==
Since 2006, taxpayers who have tax liability in Luxembourg have been subject to a 15% flat rate withholding tax on interest income. For nonresident EU citizens who receive interest income from Luxembourg, a 20% tax rate applied through 30 June 2011, rising to 35% as of 1 July 2011 under the European Directive on the taxation of savings interest income.

== See also ==
- Flat tax
- Withholding tax
