= Business Asset Disposal Relief =

In the United Kingdom, entrepreneurs selling their business (technically "qualifying assets") can claim Business Asset Disposal Relief. This is a lifetime allowance of £1 million of gain that will be subject to Capital Gains Tax (CGT) at a reduced rate of 10%.

== Description ==
To be eligible, a shareholder must have a 5% or more shareholding, and have been involved for 2 years or more with a company as an employee or director. Capital distributions from a limited company can occur as a result of a member's voluntary liquidation, and resulting profits are subject to CGT. Return of share capital following a resolution at the AGM is not classed as capital gains.

The measure was introduced as Entrepreneur's Relief in April 2008, and renamed to Business Asset Disposal Relief in April 2020.

The lifetime limit on qualifying gains was raised to £2 million in the March 2010 budget, and then to £5 million three months later by the new Conservative/Liberal coalition government. In the March 2011 budget it was raised again to £10m. In the March 2020 budget, the lifetime allowance was reduced to £1m.

== Criticism ==
In the opinion of the Resolution Foundation entrepreneurs' relief is expensive, regressive and ineffective. Scrapping the tax relief, they argued in 2018, could generate £2.7 billion that could be spent on the public sector. However, that figure supposes that the relief scheme has zero effect in encouraging entrepreneurship and that individuals who had worked hard to create wealth would not look to reduce their tax bills. The Resolution Foundation maintains this tax break is enough to give £100 per year to every household in the country if it is abolished. Roughly 52,000 individuals benefited from the tax break in 2015–16, but the chief financial gain was for a few people, with about 6,000 claiming over £1m each. The overall cost of the tax relief over a decade was roughly £22bn though its effectiveness has not been seriously evaluated. Most entrepreneurs who claim the tax break say they did not know about it when they started their company, the foundation maintains.

== Investor's Relief ==
The 2016 Budget introduced Investor's Relief, which extends the relief to external investors in unlisted trading companies: they can benefit from a 10% CGT rate on disposal of their shares, subject to a minimum holding period of three years and a lifetime gains limit of £10 million. The relief was intended to improve unlisted companies' access to capital, but a 2020 report by the Office of Tax Simplification found it had seen little use and recommended its abolition.
