= Protector (trust) =

Person appointed to oversee a trustee in their administration of the trust

In trust law, a protector is a person appointed under the trust instrument to direct or restrain the trustees in relation to their administration of the trust.

Historically, the concept of a protector developed in offshore jurisdictions where settlors were (perhaps understandably) concerned about appointing a trust company in a small, distant country as sole trustee of an offshore trust which is to hold a great deal of the settlor's wealth. However, protectors now form a part of mainstream tax planning in most jurisdictions which recognise trusts.

There are a number of reasons that a settlor may wish to appoint a protector in relation to a trust:

- protectors allow a great degree of flexibility when dealing with changes in circumstances, including both factual circumstances (death, premature divorce, previously unknown children) and legal changes (any legal changes, but most frequently changes to applicable revenue laws);
- the settlor may be concerned that the trustee may not pay sufficient attention to his wishes;
- the settlor wishes certain powers to be withheld from the trustees; or
- the settlor wishes a third party to act as a main point of contact, between the beneficiaries and the trustees.

The powers vested in the protector vary both according to the proper law of the trust and the terms of the trust instrument. They include power to:

1. remove and appoint trustees;
2. approve a change of proper law;
3. approve the addition or removal of beneficiaries;
4. approve proposed trust distributions;
5. approve the appointment of an agent or adviser either generally or in relation to specific matters;
6. approve investment recommendations;
7. appoint replacement protectors; and
8. terminate the trust or approve the termination of the trust.

Conceptually many commentators have difficulty with the idea of a protector, as this undermines the role which in law has historically been fulfilled by the trustees. As protectors are a relatively recent innovation in trust law, case law is scant. Is it not even clear if as a matter a law a protector would owe fiduciary duties to the beneficiaries (although in practice, many trust instruments expressly state that they shall).

It is sometimes suggested that where the protector is too close to the beneficial interest in the trust (for example, if the protectors have power to confer benefits upon themselves, directly or indirectly) this may destroy the essential nature of the trust. If the protector has power to grant beneficial interests in the trust fund to the settlor, this may have disastrous tax consequences in some jurisdictions.
