= Discretionary trust =

Trust in which the beneficiaries and their entitlements are not fixed

In the trust law of England, Australia, Canada, and other common law jurisdictions, a discretionary trust is a trust where the beneficiaries and their entitlements to the trust fund are not fixed, but are determined by the criteria set out in the trust instrument by the settlor. It is sometimes referred to as a family trust in Australia or New Zealand. Where the discretionary trust is a testamentary trust, it is common for the settlor (or testator) to leave a letter of wishes for the trustees to guide them as to the settlor's wishes in the exercise of their discretion. Letters of wishes are not legally binding documents.

Discretionary trusts can only arise as express trusts. It is not possible for a constructive trust or a resulting trust to arise as a discretionary trust.

== Forms ==
Discretionary trusts can be discretionary in two respects. First, the trustees usually have the power to determine which beneficiaries (from within the class) will receive payments from the trust. Second, trustees can select the amount of trust property that the beneficiary receives. Although most discretionary trusts allow both types of discretion, either can be allowed on its own. It is permissible in most legal systems for a trust to have a fixed number of beneficiaries and for the trustees to have discretion as to how much each beneficiary receives, (Note: Although in many jurisdictions such a trust would be characterized as a fixed trust with a discretionary power of appointment) or to have a class of beneficiaries from whom they could select members, but provide that the amount to be provided is fixed. (Note: A common example is a scholarship set up by way of a trust fund) Most well-drafted trust instruments also provide for a power to add or exclude beneficiaries from the class; (Note: See Re Manisty's Settlement [1974] Ch 17 and Blausten v IRC [1972] Ch 1 256) this allows the trustees greater flexibility to deal with changes in circumstances (and, in particular, changes in the revenue laws of the applicable jurisdiction).

Characteristically, discretionary trusts provide for a discretionary distribution of income only, but in some cases the trustees also have a power of appointment with respect to the capital in the trust, i.e. the corpus.

Discretionary trusts are usually sub-divided into two types:

- exhaustive, where the trustees must distribute all income accruing to the trust fund; and
- non-exhaustive, where the trustees have an express power to accumulate income.

== Analysis ==
In a fixed trust the beneficiary has a specific proprietary right in relation to the trust fund. Each beneficiary of a discretionary trust, in contrast, is dependent upon the trustees to exercise their power of selection favourably. (Note: Although a discretionary beneficiary clearly does have some species of right under a discretionary trust, he is able to renounce his position as a class member; see Re Gulbenkian's Settlement (No 2) [1970] Ch 408) In Gartside v IRC [1968] AC 553 the Inland Revenue argued that as each beneficiary might be entitled to income from the trust fund, each should be charged as if he were entitled to the whole of the fund. Perhaps unsurprisingly, the House of Lords rejected this argument. Even where there is a sole member of the class remaining, so long as there is a possibility that another member of the class could come into existence, that member is not considered a sole beneficiary for purposes of taxation liability. (Note: Re Trafford's Settlement [1985] Ch 32)

Gartside v IRC concerned a non-exhaustive discretionary trust; however, in Re Weir's Settlement [1969] 1 Ch 657 and Sainsbury v IRC [1970] Ch 712, the courts held that the same analysis was equally applicable to exhaustive discretionary trusts.

The rights of individual beneficiaries under a discretionary trust being uncertain, it was open to question to what extent the beneficiaries of a discretionary trust (if all of adult age and sound mind) could utilise the rule in Saunders v Vautier. It had been held that beneficiaries under a discretionary trust could do so, (Note: Re Smith [1928] Ch 915) although that authority was decided pre-McPhail v Doulton, where to be valid the trustees had to be able to draw up a "complete list" of beneficiaries. That notwithstanding, leading commentators have suggested that provided all of the beneficiaries could be ascertained, they should still retain the right to terminate the trust under the rule, so long as it is an exhaustive discretionary trust.

== Duties ==
The ordinary correlation between beneficiaries' rights and trustees' duties which arises in fixed trusts is absent in discretionary trusts. Although there are clearly duties, it is less clear whether there are any correlating rights. (Note: It has been suggested that "the discretionary trust in fact depends on a rule-concept of duty, with no such necessity for correlative rights." (1971) 87 LQR 231) However, it seems clear that the trustees' duty is limited to (a) determining whether to exercise their discretion, and (b) exercising their discretion lawfully under the terms of the trust. Whilst the beneficiaries will have standing to sue the trustees for failing to fulfill their duties, it is not clear that they would gain by such action.

In Re Locker's Settlement [1977] 1 WLR 1323 the trustees of a discretionary trust did not make any distributions for a number of years based upon the expressed wishes of the settlor. The trust then fell dormant, and after several more years, the trustees sought directions. The court held that their discretionary powers continued, and that they should exercise it in respect of the dormant years now as they should have done at the time. The court reaffirmed that if trustees refuse to distribute income, or refuse to exercise their discretion, although the court could not compel it be exercised in a particular manner, it could order that the trustees be replaced.

The position with a duty to consider exercising discretion in non-exhaustive discretionary trusts is more complicated, as the duty to exercise discretion can be satisfied by deciding to accumulate.

== Purposes ==
Discretionary trusts still serve a useful function to their beneficiaries, despite their original source of popularity (tax savings) having diminished in most countries. They still continue to be used for these reasons, among others:

- to protect the assets of irresponsible beneficiaries against creditors – as the beneficiary has no claim to any specific part of the trust fund, none of the trust fund is vulnerable to attachment by the trustee in bankruptcy of any beneficiary
- For trustees to exercise control over young or improvident beneficiaries
- in certain jurisdictions, a discretionary trust can be used to protect family assets from being lost to any divorce settlement, although some jurisdictions simply ignore trusts for this purpose. (Note: Although most jurisdictions simply look through trusts for this purpose, for example, in the United Kingdom see section 25 of the Matrimonial Causes Act 1973)

== Popularity and decline ==
The popularity of discretionary trusts rose sharply after the decision of the House of Lords in McPhail v Doulton [1971] AC 424 where Lord Wilberforce restated the test for certainty of objects in connection with discretionary trusts. Previously, it had been understood that for the trust to be valid, the trustees had to be able to draw up a "complete list" of all the possible beneficiaries, and if they could not do so, the trust was void. But Lord Wilberforce held that provided it could be said of any person whether they were "in or out" of the class, as described by the settlor, the trust would be valid.

Because under a discretionary trust, no one beneficiary could be said to have title to any trust assets prior to a distribution, this made discretionary trusts a powerful weapon for tax planners. Inevitably, the surge in popularity has led to a legislative response in most jurisdictions, thus in many countries there are now considerable tax disadvantages to discretionary trusts, which has predictably hampered their use outside the scope of charitable trusts. In the United Kingdom, for example, the Finance Act 1975 imposed a "capital transfer tax" on any property settled on a discretionary trust, which was replaced in the Finance Act 1988 by the inheritance tax.

== By country ==
=== Australia ===
In Australia, a family trust refers to a type of discretionary trust, set up to manage the assets of a family or its business. Family trusts are vehicles for the protection of family assets or the employ of a tax minimisation strategy. Commonly used to arrange family affairs, family trusts place an obligation on a trustee to hold and manage assets on behalf of beneficiaries. This method of financial structuring removes assets from ownership of an individual. This in turn can impact tax liability, as income derived from the trust can then be distributed to its beneficiaries by the trustee.

Discretionary trusts are the most common trust method used in Australia, where the trustee is given complete direction as to how trust income is distributed to beneficiaries. Family trusts are the typical discretionary trust, used to hold the personal or business assets of a family. A family business can be operated through a discretionary family trust, with the beneficiaries of that trust being paid a share of the profits made. This allows for the income made to be divided between family members, who then may each pay a lower rate of taxation than otherwise would be due.

Family trusts in Australia are primarily used by the wealthy, with 0.4 percent of taxpayers accounting for 95 percent of the income distributed from such trusts. The Australian Taxation Office estimates an approximate total of 800,000 trusts in Australia, with assets totalling more than $3 trillion. Family trusts pay no tax, with the funds directed into the trust then distributed to individual beneficiaries who then pay tax at the appropriate rate.

The Australia Institute has expressed concern about the "staggering" amount of tax avoided through the use of such trusts, observing Australians with taxable incomes of A$500,000 or more contribute most to the total of assets currently managed by trusts.

== Protective trust ==
The Protective Trust is a form of settlement found in England and Wales and several Commonwealth countries. It has marked similarities to asset-protection trusts found in several offshore jurisdictions and US Spendthrift trusts. To give protection to beneficiaries, a protective trust automatically converts into a discretionary trust, under which the beneficiary has no right to the income, if anything is done which breaches a condition specified in the document creating the trust.

In such a trust assets are ordinarily held to pay an income to the beneficiary. The beneficiary may also have access to capital of the trust with the trustee's permission. The right to receive income from a trust would ordinarily be an asset in the hands of the beneficiary and could be sold, thwarting the intention of the donor to spread the gift over the recipient's lifetime. Additionally on a bankruptcy the right to the income would be sold by the beneficiary's trustee in bankruptcy.

The establishment of this discretionary trust is ordinarily exempt from the charge to UK inheritance tax on the establishment of discretionary trusts.

Such protective trusts have a longstanding history. To reduce the verbose definitions that had previously to be recited in the establishing documents of a protective trust, in England and Wales s33 of the Trustee Act 1925 (and equivalent legislation in other jurisdictions) provides that this protection will arise in any trust described as a "protective trust" in its trust deed.

Protective trusts are subject to challenge under creditor protection legislation as are any other forms of asset-protection. However many jurisdictions do not permit a trust to be broken where a debtor who remains a discretionary beneficiary only under a trust and cannot access the fund without the exercise of the trustees' discretion in his favour.

== See also ==
- Asset protection
- In the Matter of the Doe 1 Trust - 2024 case about changing the terms of the Murdoch Family Trust
- Personal injury trust
- Taxation of trusts (United Kingdom)
