= Italian trust law =

In Italian trust law, a trust is a particular juridical instrument by which a settler (disponente) can transfer a property (movable or immovable property) to a trustee, who has to exercise and manage this right for a beneficiary (to whom the full property will be transferred with the termination of the trust) who has the "equitable right". In civil law systems, the beneficiary's right is not a "diritto reale" but a "personal right" towards the "trustee". If it is not foreseen by the constitutive contract, the property assets cannot be alienated by either the trustee or the beneficiary. Trust property cannot be foreclosed by the personal creditors of the trustee, the beneficiary, or their heirs.

== Current situation ==
In Italy, trusts can be used thanks to the adoption of the Hague Convention (1 July 1985), effective from 1 January 1992. The "trust interno" is a domestic trust, but refers to a foreign regulation because as of August 2010 Italy does not have a complete and organic internal regulation on trust. Trusts can be used for various aims: administration, transfer of family business assets, transfer of goods for charity purposes, protection of patrimony, etc. The main advantages are the flexibility of its use and its economic convenience compared to Italian traditional juridical instruments. Nevertheless, they have not enjoyed widespread usage in Italy, mainly because of the scarce knowledge of their functioning.

== Proposed legislation ==
Italy has proposed its own regulation on trust (fiducia). The Italian government has been tasked by the Community Law 2010 (bill/ legge comunitaria) with adopting a specific regulation on trusts within the Italian juridical system (title II art. 11). The "disegno di legge n. 2284/2010" (bill n. 2284/2010), an unexamined bill presented by the Ministry of Justice in July 2010, charges the Government with modifying the civil code as concerns trusts and that particular form of security contract.

The proposed Italian regulation on trusts is inspired by the French fiducie, which encompassed (by ordinance nº 2009-112 2009) individuals and corporations excluded from the payment of corporate taxes; the capacity to constitute a trust; and permission for attorneys to become trustees.

=== In specific jurisdictions ===
- Argentinian law number 24.441 of 1994.
- Australian trust law
- Henson trust
- Trust law in Civil law jurisdictions
- Trust law in England and Wales
- Trust Law of the People's Republic of China
- United States trust law
- Waqf

== See also ==
- Trust law
- Fiducie
