= Australian trust law =

Australian trust law is the law of trusts as it is applied in Australia. It is derived from, and largely continues to follow English trust law, as modified by state and federal legislation. A number of unique features of Australian trust law arise from interactions with the Australian systems of company law, family law and taxation.

== General law of trusts ==
A trust is a three-party fiduciary relationship in which the first party, the trustor or settlor, transfers ("settles") property (often but not necessarily a sum of money) upon the second party (the trustee) for the benefit of the third party, the beneficiary. This trustee relationship may arise as a result of the trustee entering into an agreement with the settlor (commonly in the form of a trust deed) (also called an inter vivos trust), as a result of a testamentary trust or as a result of the operation of law as a constructive trust or resulting trust. In each case, the trustee holds the legal title to the property but is obliged to act in accordance with the provisions of the deed or will and generally for the benefit of the beneficiaries, and not the settlor.

The word trust specifically refers to the duty or aggregate accumulation of obligation that rest upon a person described as the trustees. The responsibilities of trustees are in relation to property held by them, or under their control. The trustees will be compelled by a court in its equitable jurisdiction to administer trust property in the manner lawfully prescribed by the trust instrument, or where there be no specific provision written or oral, or to the extent that such provision is invalid or lacking, in accordance with equitable principles.

A trustee has a legal interest in the property of the trust. The beneficiary has an equitable interest. If a person holds both the legal interest and the equitable interest, then the equitable interest will cease to exist and a single legal estate will subsist. See also: Stickney v. Keeble [1915] AC 386 Swarb Law UK

Equity recognises cases where a party places trust/confidence in another, these relationships are protected by equity and are called fiduciary relationships. The critical feature of fiduciary relationships is that the trustee undertakes to act for or on behalf of the beneficiary in the exercise of a power or discretion which will affect the interest of the trustee in a legal or practical sense. In the exercise of a fiduciary duty, a trustee must not take a benefit from their position as trustee unless the beneficiary or beneficiaries have given their informed consent.

== Common trusts ==
=== Express trust ===
In an express trust, the settlor indicates an intention to and deliberately creates the trust, while a non-express trust is one that arises by operation of law, such as when created by statute or by judges, such as a constructive trust.

An express trust may be a public express trust such as one for a charitable purpose, or a private express trust with the private purpose.

=== Classification of trusts ===
There are a variety of trusts recognised and used in Australia, including unit trusts, discretionary trusts, hybrid trusts, and testamentary trusts.

Under a discretionary trust the share, if any, which each beneficiary is to receive is determined by the trustees. Therefore, the trustee has a discretion as to which beneficiary is to receive income or capital under the trust even if there is a duty for them to distribute the income. In addition, the trustees also have a discretion as to the amount that each beneficiary will receive. However, the beneficiary has no real right substantively.

Streaming a category of trust income to a particular beneficiary provides tax planning opportunities. For example, foreign tax credits can be best used by resident individual beneficiaries with high marginal tax rates and net capital gains can be best used by beneficiaries with carried forward capital losses, low-income beneficiaries with carried forward revenue losses and minors able to receive excepted trust income. However, discretionary trusts are usually unsuitable for the accumulation of profits as the undistributed income will generally be taxed at 45%.

Family trusts are often used to distribute income to beneficiaries in an attempt to achieve the lowest tax outcomes available to the members of the trust. Discretionary trusts also protect assets when individual members become insolvent or bankrupt. Asset protection is also extended to other types of liabilities.

The power of appointment of the trustee of a discretionary trust is held by the Appointor. In some trust deeds, the person holding the power of appointment of the trustee is called the Custodian or the Principal of the trust. The Appointor is usually a natural person but can also be a company. Generally, upon the death of the Appointor, in the absence of an alternate appointment in the trust deed, the personal legal representative (executor) of the Appointor becomes the Appointor. The real power in relation to the control of the trust rests with the Appointor because of the ability to terminate the appointment of the trustee and appoint a different trustee. This must be kept in mind when considering succession and estate planning involving assets held in a discretionary trust.

Bare trust

A bare trust is a basic trust in which trust assets are held in the name of a trustee but the beneficiary, if he or she is above 18 years of age, has the absolute right to the capital, assets and income of the trust. The trustee has no say in how or when the trust's capital or income is distributed and must act according to the beneficiary's instructions. Bare trusts may be established because they offer tax advantages to the settlor or beneficiary and may arise when all conditions to which a beneficiary is subject (such as age) have been satisfied.

== Creating a trust ==
A trust can be intentionally created during the settlor's life (inter Vivos) by declaration or transfer. A deceased estate is a testamentary trust which automatically arises on the death of the testator. Courts may also create trusts, such as constructive trusts, as an equitable remedy.

=== Declaration of trust ===
A settlor can declare him/herself trustee of his/her own property. The settlor already holds title to the property and all that needs to be done is to make a valid declaration. However, a declaration of trust will not be allowed out of an invalid gift.

Formalities relevant depend on nature of trust property. A trust of land must comply with statutory requirements based on the Statute of Frauds 1677.

Where the trust is created by virtue of a contract made as consideration for marriage, or a contact which concerns any interests in land, s 4 of the Statute of Frauds (or their equivalent legislation in other states) may operate to void such a contract unless it is evidenced in writing and signed by both parties to be charged.

=== Trusts created by transfer ===
A settlor can create an express trust by transferring property to a trustee to hold on trust. Two requirements must be satisfied:

- declaration of trust, which must establish that the recipient of the property is intended to take the property in the capacity of trustee and not beneficially. The words used by the settlor will be construed in the context of the transfer itself.
- there must be a valid transfer of trust property following the principle set out in Corin v Patton which held a transfer may be valid in equity even though it may not be considered valid at law. A transfer will be considered valid in equity only when the settlor has done all the things that must be done to transfer their interest in the property. The things required to be done by the settlor cannot be done by anyone else.

Trusts of land created by transfer must be evidenced in writing, as required by provisions derived from the Statute of Frauds 1677. See also Conveyancing Act 1919 (NSW) s23C.

A trust that fails to meet the requirement to transfer property in writing will not be void, rather it will be unenforceable.

== Trust income ==
The net income of a trust is determined in accordance with the trust deed, and a beneficiary's entitlement will depend on the trust deed and any discretion that the trustee has under the deed to allocate income between beneficiaries.

Generally, under Australian tax law, the net income of a trust (which may be different to that determined under the deed) is taxed in the hands of the beneficiaries (or the trustee on their behalf) based on their share of the trust's income (that is, the share to which they are 'presently entitled') regardless of when or whether the income is actually paid to them. A beneficiary is presently entitled to trust income for an income year where they have, by the end of that year, a present or immediate right to demand payment from the trustee, which is determined by the trust deed as well as any discretionary powers of the trustee.
