= SPA Trust =

In United States trust law, a SPA Trust is an irrevocable trust that includes a special power of appointment. Unlike general powers of appointment, a special power of appointment is limited to a certain class of persons or entities that may receive the benefit of the power (appointee) from the person in whom the power is vested (donee). Generally, SPA trusts are used to hold property for asset protection purposes, because of the benefits and control a SPA trust offers over the assets protected within the trust.

The purpose of a SPA Trust is to protect assets from a person's potential future liabilities by removing the assets from the person's legal ownership. A SPA Trust is created by a legal document which is prepared by an attorney who has expertise with debtor—creditor law, income tax law, gift and estate tax law, and trust law.

The SPA Trust is built upon the following legal principles:

1. With respect to an irrevocable trust, a creditor of the settlor may reach the maximum amount that can be distributed to or for the settlor's benefit.

2. A settlor can retain a special power of appointment without subjecting the trust to the claims of creditors.

By retaining a special power of appointment, the settlor should receive the following benefits: (1) The settlor can transfer unlimited amounts to the trust at any time without gift tax consequences, (2) the assets of the trust are entitled to a step-up in basis upon the settlor's death, (3) the settlor can pay the income taxes on the earnings of the trust and allow the trust to grow tax free, (4) the settlor can put a home in the trust and retain all the tax benefits of home ownership if the trust is a grantor trust, (5) the trust is eligible to own stock in an S corporation, and (6) the settlor can change the trustees, the beneficiaries, or the terms of the trust at any time.

The SPA Trust is a sophisticated and highly technical legal agreement and its effectiveness in accomplishing any particular purpose will depend upon the expertise of those who create it and the circumstances of each particular case.
