= Offshore trust =

An offshore trust is a conventional trust that is formed under the laws of an offshore jurisdiction.

Generally, offshore trusts are similar in nature and effect to their onshore counterparts; they involve a settlor transferring (or 'settling') assets (the 'trust property') on the trustees to manage for the benefit of a person, class or persons (the 'beneficiaries') or, occasionally, an abstract purpose. However, a number of offshore jurisdictions have modified their laws to make their jurisdictions more attractive to settlors forming offshore structures as trusts. Liechtenstein, a civil jurisdiction which is sometimes considered to be offshore, has artificially imported the trust concept from common law jurisdictions by statute.

== Uses of offshore trusts ==
Official statistics on trusts are difficult to come by, as in most offshore jurisdictions (and in most onshore jurisdictions), trusts are not required to be registered; however, it is thought that the most common use of offshore trusts is as part of the tax and financial planning of wealthy individuals and their families. For instance, the founder of Wonga.com, Errol Damelin, holds his shares through Castle Bridge Ventures, a trust based in the British Virgin Islands. While the family behind the Nando's restaurant chain, the Enthovens, reportedly use trusts in the Channel Islands as part of their financial planning. Other users of offshore trusts include Sir Ken Morrison, the British supermarket magnate, the Rothermere family, who own the Daily Mail group and the late Bruce Gyngell, who founded TV-am.

However, offshore trusts have other uses too:

- Offshore trusts are also sometimes formed as unit trusts to operate as a mutual fund.
- Offshore trusts are often used as part of an orphan structure in capital markets or trade finance transactions.
- Pan-national non-governmental bodies are sometimes established as offshore trusts. For example, the International Cricket Council is formed in the British Virgin Islands.

== Types of offshore trusts ==
Below are the most common types of trusts:

A revocable offshore trust is a trust which can be liquidated or altered by the settlor according to the terms, that are set out in the Trust Deed.

An irrevocable offshore trust may not be changed or liquidated by the settlor.

A discretionary offshore trust enables the trustee to decide on the distribution of profits for different classes of beneficiaries.

In a fixed trust, the distribution of income to the beneficiaries is fixed and can not be changed by the trustee.

A hybrid trust includes elements of a discretionary and a fixed trust.

== Benefits ==
The benefits of an offshore trust include:

- Confidentiality and anonymity: Despite the fact that an offshore trust is officially registered with the government, the parties of the trust, assets, and the conditions of the trust are not recorded in the register.
- Tax-exempt status: Assets that are transferred to an offshore trust (in a tax-exempt offshore zone) are not taxed either when transferred to the trust or when transferred or redistributed to the beneficiaries.
- The ability to transfer assets in a short time and without high costs: The transfer of property inherited through an offshore trust does not require the approval of a judge or the high cost of a lawyer.
- Asset protection: The Trust protects assets from forced transfer by inheritance, from seizure in divorce and bankruptcy.
- Accumulation of capital: The trust can own commercial enterprises, open bank accounts, participate in international investment projects, and its revenues will accumulate in one of the tax-free offshore zones.
- Reliability: The capital will be safe from a financially, politically and economically unstable world.
- Versatility: In the trust, one can transfer any assets, including cash, real estate, business, stocks, and intellectual property rights.

== Rule against perpetuities ==
Trusts in general are subject to the rule against perpetuities, which, in practical terms, puts limits on the length of time within which all trust property must be distributed. Because of the strictures of the rule, a number of trusts have been struck down in wildly hypothetical circumstances because of possible infringement of the rule (e.g., the fertile octogenarian).

Most offshore jurisdictions which have sophisticated trust laws have modified their laws relating to perpetuity to allow the settlor to select lengthy, fixed, perpetuity periods, to avoid the use of "Royal lives" clauses. Many have also adopted "wait and see" laws, which mean that trusts which might potentially infringe the rule against perpetuities are no longer automatically invalid, but instead the trust remains valid unless and until the perpetuity period is breached.

In Jersey, the rule against perpetual trusts has actually been abolished entirely. This has also been done in a number of U.S. states.

== Management of underlying companies ==
Trusts in general are subject to the rule in Bartlett v Barclays Bank, which provides (briefly) that where trust property includes the shares of a company, then the trustees must take a positive role in the affairs of the company. The rule has been criticised, but remains part of trust law in many common law jurisdictions.

A number of offshore jurisdictions (notably the Cayman Islands, with STAR trusts, and the British Virgin Islands, with VISTA trusts) have created special forms of trust that may be expressly settled without imposing an obligation on the trustees to interfere in management in this way.

Paradoxically, these specialised forms of trusts seem to be used infrequently in relation to their original intended uses. STAR trusts seem to be used more frequently by hedge funds forming mutual funds as unit trusts (where the fund managers wish to eliminate any obligation to attend meetings of the companies in whose securities they invest), and VISTA trusts are frequently used as a part of orphan structures in bond issues where the trustees wish to divorce themselves from supervising the issuing vehicle.

Critics in onshore jurisdictions have suggested that these specialised trusts have provisions that so fundamentally undermine the nature of a trust that they should not be recognised in an onshore jurisdiction, but whatever the view of onshore tax authorities and regulators, it seems unlikely that the courts in onshore jurisdictions would be prepared to derogate from the Hague Convention on the Law Applicable to Trusts and on their Recognition.

== Asset protection ==
Certain jurisdictions (notably the Cook Islands, but the Bahamas also has a species of asset protection trust) have provided special trusts which are styled as asset protection trusts. While all trusts have an asset protection element, some jurisdictions have enacted laws trying to make life difficult for creditors to press claims against the trust (for example, by providing for particularly short limitation periods). In practice, the effectiveness of such trusts is limited as the bankruptcy and/or divorce laws in the settlor's home jurisdiction will usually operate to set aside transfers to the trusts, and most jurisdictions (including offshore jurisdictions) set aside transactions entered into to defraud creditors.

== Powers of investment ==
Most traditional jurisdictions only permit trustees to make very conservative financial investments. Most offshore jurisdictions give trustees flexibility and permit (or allow the settlor to specify in the trust instrument that they are permitted) a wider range of investments, including higher risk investments such as derivatives and futures contracts and specific investments, such as an investment into a small private company, in any area of the world.

== Purpose trusts ==
Whilst in most common law jurisdictions, trusts must either be formed for the benefit of persons or charitable purposes, many offshore jurisdictions have also amended their laws to permit trusts to be formed for non-charitable purposes. Such trusts need to enforce a "protector" to be able to enforce the terms of the trust, but doubt remains as to who should be treated as the beneficial owner of the trust funds for tax purposes prior to their distribution.

No offshore jurisdiction yet appears to have made a serious effort to expand upon the flexibility of discretionary trusts in relation to certainty of objects, as expounded in McPhail v Doulton. This may be because the common law rules are now considered to be sufficiently flexible to make no widening necessary to attract trust business.

== Anachronistic common law rules ==
Many offshore jurisdictions have also legislated to abolish certain anachronistic common law rules which sometimes cause difficulty for trust planning. These include:

- Rule in Howe v Earl of Dartmouth
- Rule in Maloney v Alveranga
- Rule in Re Atkinson

== See also ==
- Private foundation
