= Totten trust =

Type of trust in U.S. law

A Totten trust (also referred to as a "Payable on Death" account) is a form of trust in the United States in which one party (the settlor or "grantor" of the trust) places money in a bank account or security with instructions that upon the settlor's death, whatever is in that account will pass to a named beneficiary. For example, a Totten trust arises when a bank account is titled in the form "[depositor], in trust for [beneficiary]".

== Origin ==
The name is derived from Matter of Totten, 179 N.Y. 112 (1904), the case decided by the New York Court of Appeals which established the legality of this practice. Although this method of creating a trust did not meet the formal requirements of trust creation, or the testamentary formalities required to make a valid will, the Court noted that such an arrangement typically involved a small amount of money left by a person of modest means, who could not otherwise afford to establish a legal mechanism for passing the specified property. For this reason, the device is sometimes called a "poor man's will". The funds in question are not subject to probate and, if held in a bank account, are insured in the same manner as any deposit. The beneficiary has no access to the account until the depositor's death and need not be notified that the account exists. This is also called a tentative trust because it is contingent upon the death of the settlor or creator of the trust account.

== Totten trusts today ==
Most U.S. states now recognize the validity of Totten trusts. The Restatement 3d of Trusts (Section 26) and the Restatement 3d of Property (Section 7.1 comment i) also recognize its validity. Such a device can be revoked at any time by the settlor, either by closing the account or by executing a will which disposes of the property in the account. The funds in the account can be reached by the creditors of the settlor during the settlor's life. If the intended beneficiary predeceases the settlor, then the gift will lapse, and will generally not be saved by an anti-lapse statute.

A Totten Trust is classified as a "testamentary substitute" because it avoids the need for the assets held in the account to go through probate.

Totten trusts can be created only with certain types of depository accounts or securities; in particular they can not be used to convey real property.

More generally, Totten trusts are sometimes described as "Arrangements for deposit accounts."

== See also ==
- Purpose trust
