= Q-Tip (disambiguation) =

Q-Tips is a brand of cotton swab.

Q-Tip may also refer to:

- Q-Tip (musician), an American rapper
- Q-Tips (band), an English band

== See also ==
- QTIP Trust, a type of financial planning tool
