= Blind trust =

Trust with complete autonomy of trustees

A blind trust is a trust in which the beneficiaries have no knowledge of the holdings of the trust, and no right to intervene in their handling. In a blind trust, the trustees (fiduciaries, or those who have been given power of attorney) have full discretion over the assets. Blind trusts are generally used when a trust creator (sometimes called a settlor, trustor, grantor, or donor) wishes for the beneficiary to be unaware of the specific assets in the trust, such as to avoid conflict of interest between the beneficiary and the investments.

Politicians often place their personal assets (including investment income) into blind trusts, to avoid public scrutiny and accusations of conflicts of interest when they direct government funds to the private sector.

== Use by US government officials to avoid conflicts of interest ==
The US federal government recognizes the "qualified blind trust" (QBT), as defined by the Ethics in Government Act and related regulations. In order for a blind trust to be a QBT, the trustee must not be affiliated with, associated with, related to, or subject to the control or influence of the government official.

Because the assets initially placed in the QBT are known to the government official (who is both creator and beneficiary of the trust), these assets continue to pose a potential conflict of interest until they have been sold (or reduced to a value less than $1,000). New assets purchased by the trustee will not be disclosed to the government official, so they will not pose a conflict.

== British party funding ==
In the United Kingdom, while the Labour Party was in opposition in 1992–1997, its front bench received funding from blind trusts. One set up to fund its campaign in the 1997 general election received donations from wealthy supporters, some of whose names leaked out, and some of whom received life peerages into the House of Lords after Labour won the election. The Neill Committee's report in 1998 found the use of blind trusts to be "inconsistent with the principles of openness and accountability" and recommended that such trusts be "prohibited as a mechanism for funding political parties, party leaders or their offices, Members of Parliament or parliamentary candidates" This was incorporated into the Political Parties, Elections and Referendums Act 2000 as section 57 "Return of donations where donor unidentifiable".
