= Vivien v. WorldCom =

- Court: United States District Court for the Northern District of California
- Full case name: Stephen Vivien and Edward Prince v. WorldCom, Inc., Bernard J. Ebbers, and Scott D. Sullivan
- Decided: July 26, 2002
- Docket nos.: 3:02-cv-01329
- Citation: 2002 U.S. Dist. LEXIS 27666; 2002 WL 31640557

Case history
- Related actions: In re WorldCom, Inc. Securities Litigation, MDL No. 1487, 1:02-cv-03288, 234 F. Supp. 2d 301 (S.D.N.Y. 2002)

Court membership
- Judge sitting: William Alsup

Vivien v. WorldCom, Inc., No. 3:02-cv-01329 (N.D. Cal. July 26, 2002) established a new legal theory permitting workers to recover for losses in their 401(k) retirement plans caused by investment in their employers' stock.

== Facts ==
The Complaint alleged that the WorldCom Retirement Plan administrators were WorldCom insiders who knew or had reason to know that the price of WorldCom stock was artificially high because public statements concerning the Company's business and prospects were false or misleading to investors. When the facts became public, the stock plummeted, thus resulting in the near total loss of retirement funds.

Problems With Remedies Under the Securities Law

The allegations of fraud and artificial inflation of WorldCom's stock price formed the basis for a lawsuit brought by investors under the securities laws, but that suit offered inadequate chance for recovery for WorldCom employees who invested in company stock in their 401(k) plan. A common perception is that employees actually own stock in their companies when they invest in company stock funds in their retirement plan. Typically, however, the plan itself owns the stock.

The securities laws provide limited help in the case of 401(k) plans because investors can only recover for shares that they purchased during the period when the stock was artificially inflated by fraud; they cannot recover for losses to stocks that they purchased before the fraud began, but held during the period of artificial inflation. Moreover, suits on behalf of a retirement plan need only prove breach of fiduciary duty and are not required to meet the more difficult fraud standard.

The Vivien Suit's ERISA-Based Theory of Recovery

Because of the limitations outlined above, plaintiffs in the Vivien action sued under the Employee Retirement Income Security Act (ERISA) of 1974, a federal statute established to protect the rights of employee benefit plan participants.

ERISA requires that those who run employee welfare plans – including 401(k) retirement plans – have a duty to provide accurate information about the plans to participants, and to invest the assets of the plans prudently. These are "fiduciary duties" – the highest duties imposed by law.

The Vivien Complaint alleged that the Defendants breached their fiduciary duty of prudence under ERISA by continuing to invest plan assets in WorldCom stock when the stock was artificially inflated by the false and misleading statements of WorldCom's senior management.

The Defendants moved to dismiss the complaint, arguing that it was "actually a securities-fraud action governed by the Private Securities Litigation Reform Act masquerading as an ERISA action." The Court disagreed.

== Judgment ==
Giving the judgment of the Court, Judge William Alsup held that the plaintiff's complaint adequately alleged that the defendants acted in a fiduciary capacity and had breached that duty by their imprudent investment in company stock.

== Significance ==
The Vivien decision provided the legal framework for many similar suits filed by employees of companies such as AOL Time Warner, Reliant Energy, Cardinal Health, Tyco International, Merck, and Dell. As a result of these suits, many major companies have begun to restructure their 401(k) plans, eliminating the requirement to own company stock.
