= Trust law in civil law jurisdictions =

Trust law is not part of most civil law jurisdictions, but is a common figure in most common law system (and thus in most Commonwealth jurisdictions). Trust law enters civilian jurisdictions through conflict of law arrangements recognizing it as a matter of private international law and has been implemented in the civil code of certain countries such as Liechtenstein and Curaçao.

== Conflict of laws ==
Sometimes, in a civil law jurisdiction, a foreign trust is involved. This recognition often involves "translating" the trust's characteristics into legal concepts that do exist within the civil law country. With the accession of the United Kingdom to the European Community, the trust entered Community Law; the law of the member state where the trust is constituted (the situs) is designated as the applicable law (the law that must be followed) in member states. Certain trusts must be recognized by parties to the Hague Trust Convention (amongst which the civil law countries Italy, Liechtenstein, Luxembourg, the Netherlands and Switzerland) if they are following certain requirements: the trust must be an express trust reduced to writing.

== Curaçao, Sint Maarten and Liechtenstein ==
The Curaçao trust and Sint Maarten trust exist since 1 January 2012 and 1 April 2014 respectively. They enable creation of trusts in the jurisdiction of Curaçao/Sint Maarten, when constituted by notarial instrument. The legislation is similar as it is based on a legislative act proposed for the Netherlands Antilles, and which was adopted in both jurisdictions separately after the dissolution of the Netherlands Antilles.

The Liechtenstein trust requires a written agreement and registration on a trusts registry, which will not be publicly available if it is registered within 12 months. Later registrations require the registration in public record of the trustee's name, and certain details of the trust.

== Czech Republic ==
The Czech Republic trust exists since 1 January 2014 and is based on Quebec Civil Code regulation.
