= Offshore structure =

Offshore structure may refer to:

- Offshore financial centre
  - Offshore company
  - Offshore partnership
  - Offshore trust
- offshore construction
