= Express trust =

Trust which is explicitly created and not inferred from the parties' conduct

In trust law, an express trust is a trust created "in express terms, and usually in writing, as distinguished from one inferred by the law from the conduct or dealings of the parties." Property is transferred by a person (called a trustor, settlor, or grantor) to a transferee (called the trustee), who holds the property for the benefit of one or more persons, called beneficiaries. The trustee may distribute the property, or the income from that property, to the beneficiaries. Express trusts are frequently used in common law jurisdictions as methods of wealth preservation or enhancement.

== Terms ==
Law generally requires only a simple formality to create an express trust. In certain jurisdictions, an express trust may even be established orally. Typically, a settlor would record the disposition, where real property is to be held in trust or the value of property in trust is large. Where legal title to property is being passed to a trustee, a "deed of settlement" or "trust instrument" (for jurisdictions that do not recognise deeds) may be used. Where property is to continue to be held by the person making the trust, a "declaration of trust" will be appropriate.

Often, a trust corporation or more than one trustee is appointed to allow for uninterrupted administration of the trust in the event of a trustee's resignation, death, bankruptcy or incapacity. Additionally a Protector may be appointed who, for example, is authorized to appoint new trustees and to review the trustees' annual accounts.

To be valid at common law, a trust instrument must ascertain its beneficiaries, as well as the res (a Law Latin term meaning "thing") or subject matter of the trust, unless it is a charitable trust which does not provide specific beneficiaries.

To be valid in equity, a trust must satisfy the following elements:

1. Property or rights of a kind which can be the subject of a trust
2. A declaration of trust or disposition on trust by a person legally competent to create a trust
3. Certainty of property and objects (trust must be administratively workable)
4. Compliance with requirements regarding evidence
5. Compliance with rules against remoteness of vesting (rule against perpetuities and rule against inalienability of income for longer than the perpetuity period)

== Common forms of express trust ==
Bare trust
property transferred to another to hold e.g. for a third person absolutely. May be of use where property is to be held and invested on behalf of a minor child or mentally incapacitated person.

Life Interest trust
the income from property transferred is paid to one person, "the life tenant" (e.g. a widow/er), during their lifetime and thereafter is transferred to another person (who may take absolutely or a second life interest according to the terms of the trust, in the second case a third beneficiary would come into play). The trustees may have power to pay capital as well as income to the life tenant. Alternatively, they may have rights to transfer ("appoint") property to other beneficiaries ahead of their entitlement.

Discretionary trust
the trustees may pay out income to whichever of the beneficiaries they, in the reasonable exercise of their discretion, think fit. They will normally also have a power to pay out capital. They may have extensive powers, even to add new beneficiaries, but such powers may normally only be exercised bona fide in the interests of the beneficiaries as a whole. Discretionary trusts must not be indefinite and are subject to 'the rule against perpetuities'. In New South Wales, the time prescribed is a statutory period of 80 years from the date the disposition takes effect.
Charitable trusts
this is also a form of discretionary trust; trusts for a purpose (as opposed to for individuals) are generally invalid at common law however charities are an exception. Persons wishing to pass money to causes not recognised as charitable may instead make gifts to established companies or associations or may establish trusts or trust-like structures in jurisdictions which do not restrict non-charitable purpose trusts (e.g. Jersey trusts, Danish and US foundations and Liechtenstein Anstallts).

Protective trusts and Spendthrift trusts
can be established to provide an income for persons who cannot be trusted with it.

== Three Certainties of Express Trust ==
- Certainty of intention: Must be real intention by the settlor to dispose of property and create trust, not just make a gift – a trust also can't be created contrary to the intention of the settlor alleged to have created it: Commissioner of Stamp Duties (Qld) v Jolliffe.
- Certainty of subject:The property the subject of the trusts must be sufficiently ascertainable at the time the trust was created: Herdegen v Federal Commissioner of Taxation (1988)
- Certainty of object:Beneficiaries must be ascertainable –

Fixed trust – ‘List certainty rule’ (Test)
see e.g. West v Weston (1998)
Discretionary trust -'criterion certainty test’
is whether it can be said that a given individual is or is not a member of the range of objects (class): Re Baden's Deed Trusts; McPhail v Doulton

== Variation of Trusts in English Law ==
The Variation of Trusts Act 1958 gave the courts the power to vary trusts in the following circumstances

- s1(1)(a) Any person having, directly or indirectly, an interest, whether vested or contingent, under the trusts who by reason of infancy or other incapacity is incapable of assenting; or
- s1(1)(b) Any person (whether ascertained or not) who may become entitled, directly or indirectly, to an interest under the trusts as being at a future date or on the happening of a future event a person of any specified description or a member of any specified class of persons, so however that this paragraph shall not include any person who would be of that description, or a member of that class, as the case may be, if the said date had fallen or the said event had happened at the date of the application to the court; or
- s1(1)(c) Any person unborn; or
- s1(1)(d) Any person in respect of any discretionary interest of his under protective trusts where the interest of the principal beneficiary has not failed or determined.

The Court does not have the power to consent to the variation of a trust on behalf of an ascertained individual who is sui juris.(Someone above the age of consent and of sound mind)

== Forms of trust used by UK taxpayers ==
Accumulation and Maintenance trust
A variation on the discretionary trust, the A&M does not carry the Inheritance tax disadvantages of a discretionary settlement but can only be established for persons under 25 who must be entitled to income at that age. Allows the accumulation of income within the trust until 25.

Disabled Trust
Similar to an A&M trust but established for a disabled person.

Reverter to Settlor trust
A trust where, on the death of the life tenant, the property reverts to the person making the gift.

Nil Rate Band Discretionary trust
UK inheritance tax is payable at 40% on estates worth over £325,000 for the 2009-2010 tax year. If assets up to that value are placed in a discretionary trust during a person's lifetime, the trust will not be taken into account for inheritance tax if the person survives for a further 7 years. Likewise in a will, many persons leave a legacy on discretionary trusts so as to take full advantage of their nil rate band (gifts to spouses and registered civil partners being wholly exempt).

== Forms of trust used by US persons ==
Certain US jurisdictions and other jurisdictions have developed a radically different interpretation of the trust. Valid trusts can be established by persons who then continue to deal with property as if it were their own during their lifetime, the trust crystallising on death. Trust funds can be taxed as legal entities by election ("checking the box").
