= Letter of wishes =

Instructions to trustees, written by the settlor when creating the trust

In trust law, a letter of wishes is a tool used by a settlor when setting up a trust, to pass along information to the trustees. A letter of wishes usually contains instructions or extra information for the trustees. The trustees are not legally bound to follow a letter of wishes, but it is guidance that they must take into account and in practice it is usually followed. It is mainly used because it is easy to change, unlike amending a will or trust deed, and will remain private among the trustees.
