= Accumulation and maintenance trust =

Accumulation and maintenance ("A&M") trusts are a type of discretionary trust for the benefit of children and young people in England and Wales.

== Development and tax treatment ==
The concept of an A&M trust emerged in England and Wales after the enactment of the Capital Taxes Act 1974 (CTA). The CTA discouraged the use of discretionary trusts by introducing new tax rules, but it made a specific exception for trusts designed to help young people under the age of 25. This particular type of trust grew in significance over the years and became known as an Accumulation & Maintenance Trust. They came to fall under the purview of s.71 Inheritance Tax Act 1984, which continued their special tax treatment.

The Finance Act 2006 took A&M Trusts out of the purview of s.71. Today, A&M Trusts are governed by Pt. III, Ch. III IHTA, and therefore receive exactly the same tax treatment as other types of discretionary trusts. As a result, the use of A&M trusts is declining rapidly. The new breed of "18–25" trusts are taking their place.
