= Domestic Terrorism Counsel =

The Domestic Terrorism Counsel (DTC) is a position within the Counterterrorism Section of the United States Department of Justice National Security Division (NSD).

== Function ==
The DTC's functions are to:

- become a main point of contact for U. S. Attorneys working on domestic terrorism matters;
- ensure proper coordination of domestic terrorism cases;
- serve a key role in DOJ headquarter-level efforts to identify domestic terrorism trends and to analyze legal gaps and enhancements;
- help direct DOJ Domestic Terrorism Executive Committee efforts by providing members with overview and insights for various domestic terrorism cases and trends within the United States.

== History ==
Creation of the DTC post was announced by NSD Assistant Attorney General John P. Carlin, in October 2015, during a domestic terrorism seminar at George Washington University. Carlin stated that the position would serve to ensure that the DOJ benefited from domestic terrorist-related information and input it received from around the country. He added that an appointment had been made to fill the position, but did not disclose the Counsel's name.
