= Back-bond =

Back-bond, or back-letter, in Scots law, is a deed qualifying the terms of another deed, or declaratory of the purposes for which another deed has been granted. Thus an ex facie absolute disposition, qualified by a back-bond expressing the limited nature of the right actually held by the person to whom the disposition is made, would constitute what in England is termed a deed of trust.

In Scots law, a back-bond (also known as a back-letter) is a legal document that modifies or clarifies the terms of another deed, often specifying the true purpose behind the original grant. Typically, it accompanies a deed that appears to transfer property outright—known as an ex facie absolute disposition—but restricts the recipient's rights, revealing a more limited intent. For example, a landowner might grant a farm to a creditor via an absolute disposition, with a back-bond stating the land is held only as security for a loan, to be returned once repaid—effectively creating a trust-like arrangement. This setup mirrors a deed of trust in English law, where property is held under specific conditions rather than owned outright.
