= Asset-protection trust =

Trust which allows the beneficiary access to assets without legally owning them

In trust law, an asset-protection trust is any form of trust which provides for funds to be held on a discretionary basis. Such trusts are set up in an attempt to avoid or mitigate the effects of taxation, divorce and bankruptcy on the beneficiary. Such trusts are therefore frequently proscribed or limited in their effects by governments and the courts.

The asset-protection trust is a trust that splits the beneficial enjoyment of trust assets from their legal ownership. The beneficiaries of a trust are the beneficial owners of equitable interests in the trust assets, but they do not hold legal title to the assets. Thus this kind of trust fulfills the goal of asset protection planning, i.e. to insulate assets from claims of creditors without concealment or tax evasion. A creditor's ability to satisfy a judgment against a beneficiary's interest in a trust is limited to the beneficiary's interest in such trust. Consequently, the common goal of asset protection trusts is to limit the interests of beneficiaries in such a way so as to preclude creditors from collecting against trust assets.

Such trusts must be irrevocable (a revocable trust will not provide asset protection because and to the extent of the settlor's power to revoke). Most of them contain a spendthrift clause preventing a trust beneficiary from alienating his or her expected interest in favor of a creditor. The spendthrift clause has three general exceptions to the protection afforded: the self-settled trusts (if the settlor of a trust is also a beneficiary of a trust), the case when a debtor is the sole beneficiary and the sole trustee of a trust, and the support payments (a court may order the trustee to satisfy a beneficiary's support obligation to a former spouse or minor child). The first general exception, which accounts for the majority of asset protection trusts, no longer applies in several jurisdictions. The laws of certain jurisdictions including Alaska, Bermuda, and the Cayman Islands allow self-settled trusts to afford their settlors the protection of the spendthrift clause.

== History of trusts ==
Trusts were developed at common law in England originally to minimize the impact of inheritance taxes arising from transfers at death. The essence of the trust was to separate "legal" title, which was given to someone to hold as "trustee", from "equitable title", which was to be retained by the trust beneficiaries.

In the United States and England, a practice developed whereby trust settlors began to use "spendthrift" clauses to prevent trust beneficiaries from alienating their beneficial interests to creditors. Over time, courts were asked to determine the efficacy of spendthrift clauses as against the trust beneficiaries seeking to engage in such assignments, and the creditors of those beneficiaries seeking to reach trust assets. A case law doctrine developed whereby courts may generally recognize the efficacy of spendthrift clauses as against trust beneficiaries and their creditors, but not against creditors of a settlor.

== Domestic asset protection trust ==
Alaska was the first US jurisdiction to enact laws allowing protection for self-settled trusts (in 1997) and was shortly followed by Delaware, Nevada, South Dakota and a few others. These trusts are known as Domestic Asset Protection Trusts (DAPTs). Usually, a DAPT must comply with the following requirements:

- the trust must be irrevocable and spendthrift;
- at least one resident trustee must be appointed;
- some administration of the trust must be conducted in respective state;
- the settlor cannot act as a trustee.

Trusts are generally governed by the laws of the jurisdiction that is designated by the settlor as the governing jurisdiction. There are two exceptions to the general rule, which may create conflicts of law: (i) states will not recognize laws of sister states that violate their own public policy, and (ii) if the trust owns real property, such property will be governed by the law of jurisdiction that is the property's situs. Additionally, the Full Faith and Credit Clause of the Constitution provides that each state must give full faith and credit to the laws of every other state. This means that if a court from another state refuses to recognize the protection of a DAPT and enters a judgment for the creditor, the creditor may be able to enforce the judgment against the trustee of the DAPT, even if that trustee was located in the DAPT jurisdiction. The efficacy of a DAPT may also be challenged under the Supremacy clause of the U.S. Constitution, under the applicable fraudulent transfer statute, or because the settlor retained some prohibited control over the trust.

These jurisdictions are also known as United States Asset Protection Trusts (USAPTs), from the point of view of the non-US settlors. The issues that would seem to apply on a USAPT established by a non-US settlor are: 1) whether a non-US court has jurisdiction over the USAPT; 2) the conflict of US versus non-US laws (i.e., which jurisdiction's laws will apply to the trust and the protection it purports to offer); 3) which fraudulent transfer law would apply; and 4) whether the US state court will recognize the non-US judgment.

The context of a non-US settlor has a few advantages over that of a US settlor. The issue of the Full Faith and Credit clause doctrine of the US Constitution would not apply to a non-US settlor facing a non-US judgment. Creditors of non-US settlors would have to first obtain a judgment in their home jurisdiction and then attempt to enforce that "foreign" judgment in the US against the trustee of the USAPT, who was not a party to the original action. Therefore, except in unusual cases, this would mean that the only issues to litigate would be whether a fraudulent transfer has taken place, and in turn, which jurisdiction's fraudulent transfer laws would apply. Despite that, the non-US creditor must still seek to first have the foreign judgment recognized, because without formal legal acknowledgment of the judgment in the US court, there would be no basis on which to question the transfer.

== U.S. jurisdictions ==
=== South Dakota ===
South Dakota was one of the first states (1983) to allow a trust to endure perpetually, essentially jumping outside the onerous federal transfer (gift, estate and generation-skipping) tax system theoretically forever. Currently, twenty-four other states have joined the ranks of offering a long-term trust. Nineteen of these states, including South Dakota, allow a trust to continue in perpetuity.

South Dakota does not impose any form of state taxation on the assets that comprise a trust located there. This includes, but is not limited to: no state income, capital gains, dividend/interest and/or intangible's taxes. Additionally, South Dakota has the lowest insurance premium tax of any state (i.e., 8 basis points or 8/100ths of 1%) and also offers other very favorable insurance legislation. South Dakota also has both excellent self-settled trust as well as third party discretionary trust statutes, both allowing for domestic asset protection planning with trusts.

South Dakota is the first and only state in the US with a third party discretionary trust statute for asset protection, which states that a discretionary interest in third party trust, limited power of appointments, and remainder interests are not considered property interests. South Dakota also has Asset Protection statutes for LLCs and LPs based upon a "sole remedy charging order statute". Consequently, many trust strategies for the wealthy involve trust administration in South Dakota without the necessity of having the trust's family reside there.

== Offshore jurisdictions ==
The trust laws of the offshore world are typically founded on the trust laws of the onshore world. For those jurisdictions which are currently possessions of the UK, or were former possessions of the UK, typically the British Trustee Act of 1925 is the common starting point. From there, each jurisdiction has sought to develop and evolve the law in a race to develop the most attractive trust environment which maintains acceptable standards, preserves the concepts of a trust, yet is attractive to potential users. Many of these jurisdictions share similar characteristics.

=== Bahamas ===
The Commonwealth of the Bahamas have traditionally been associated with offshore planning. However, the Bahamas are probably more noteworthy for offshore banking. The Bahamas do not recognize self-settled spendthrift trusts, unlike the Cook Islands, Nevis, or Belize.

The burden of proof for a claimant to challenge a transfer into a Bahamian Trust has a limitation period of two years, the same as Cook Islands.

The quality of the banking and investment services is reasonable for the uses of a Trustee of an asset protection trust, however, the quality of the judiciary is considered low, as the legal profession is generally closed to the entry of non-Bahamians, and it is therefore difficult bring the knowledge of a specialised trust lawyer to the jurisdiction when needed.

=== Belize ===
Belize, offers immediate protection from court action initiated by creditors which challenges the settlor's transfer of property into the trust. However, due to the paucity of credible offshore banks in Belize, many trusts established in Belize hold assets with a second trustee or third-party financial institution in another country.

=== Bermuda ===
Bermuda, entry to follow

=== Cayman Islands ===
Cayman Islands trusts are governed principally by the Cayman Islands Trusts Law (2009 Revision), however elements of the Fraudulent Dispositions Law 1989 are relevant when considering the asset protection benefits of Cayman Trusts.

A number of offshore jurisdictions have enacted modern asset protection legislation based on the Cayman Island's Fraudulent Dispositions Law 1989 (the "FDL"). The Cayman Islands FDL states "Every disposition of property made with an intention to defraud, and at undervalue, shall be voidable at the insistence of an eligible creditor thereby prejudiced". The burden of proof is borne by the creditor applying to set aside the trust, and in the case of the Cayman Islands, the creditor/claimant must bring an action in the Cayman Islands courts (not in their home jurisdiction). The bar is set high for a potential claimant to successfully challenge a transfer. They must demonstrate an intention to defraud on behalf of the Settlor, and they must demonstrate they are an "eligible creditor"—meaning that at the date of the transfer, the transferor owes an obligation to the claimant. They must also be willing to bring an action in the Cayman Islands, which by itself is an expensive proposition.

The burden of proof for a claimant to challenge a transfer into a Cayman Trust has a limitation period of six years.

In Cayman it is possible to register a trust as an Exempt Trust however it is voluntary registration regime only, so most trusts remain unregistered. As most Cayman trusts are therefore private arrangements, it is hard to give exact figures for the popularity of AP Trusts governed by Cayman law. However the number of licensed trust companies give us some indication of how the jurisdiction is viewed. As of 30 September 2012 the Fiduciary Services Division of CIMA, the body responsible for licensing and regulating trust companies in the Cayman Islands has supervisory responsibility for 146 active trust licences.

As the Cayman Islands are a British Overseas Dependent Territory, the islands are able to draw on the services of British lawyers and solicitors when contentious cases arise and lawyers with appropriate experience are required. The quality of banking and investment services are reasonably good.

=== Cook Islands ===
The Cook Islands claims to be the first country to have enacted an explicit asset protection law, implementing particular provisions in 1989 to its International Trusts Act. Several of these changes have been adopted in one form or another in several other countries and a handful of a U.S. states. The most important of these changes permits the settlor of a trust to be named as a spendthrift beneficiary.

The trust laws of the Cook Islands provide a shortened statute of limitations on fraudulent transfer claims. While most U.S. states have a four-year statute of limitations (and the Statute of Elizabeth in some common law jurisdictions has no statute of limitations), the general statute of limitations in the Cook Islands is reduced to two years for fraudulent transfers; in certain circumstances, it may be as short as one year. If the trust is funded while the settlor is solvent, then the transfer cannot be challenged.(i.e., there is no time period for the creditor to challenge the transfer)

Several provisions of the Cook Islands law specify the form of pleading that a creditor must establish in order for its claim to be heard in a Cook Islands court. The effect of these provisions is to raise the burden of proof to "beyond a reasonable doubt," something akin to a criminal law standard, in order for a creditor to establish a fraudulent transfer. The "constructive" fraudulent transfer theories are eliminated under Cook Islands law, requiring the creditor to prove that the transfer was made with specific intent to avoid the creditor's claim.

It is believed that the Cook Islands now has more registered asset protection trusts than any other country, although in most jurisdictions a Trust is considered a private arrangement and it is not a requirement to register a Trust. Case law is somewhat lacking in the Cook Islands. However, some landmark decisions show that the Cook Islands Court intends to uphold the asset protection trust law. In 1999, the Federal Trade Commission attempted to recover assets from a Cook Islands Trust. The suit filed by the FTC against a trust company was unsuccessful. The quality of the judiciary and the associated banking and investment services offered from the Cook Islands are considered poor.

=== Nevis ===
Nevis was one of the first countries to follow the Cook Islands, duplicating an older version of the Cook Islands law and naming it the Nevis International Exempt Trust Ordinance, 1994. One distinguishing feature of the Nevis legislation is that a creditor must post a bond of ECB 25,000 (roughly US$13,000) to lodge a complaint against a trust registered in Nevis.

Very little case law exists in Nevis, which many attorneys interpret to mean that creditors are effectively deterred from bringing suit in Nevis. It has a small offshore banking industry, with St. Kitts-Nevis-Anguilla Bank and Bank of Nevis International as the only licensed offshore banks.

LLC legislation modeled after the Delaware LLC Act was passed in 1996. This has enabled Nevis to distinguish itself as a primary offshore jurisdiction for LLC formations, as opposed to other countries that are well known for IBC formations (British Virgin Islands) or trust formations (Cayman Islands). A Nevis LLC is often used in conjunction with an asset protection trust because it gives the creator of the trust direct control over the assets if the creator is listed as the manager of the Nevis LLC. This gives the creator added security in that it keeps the assets one step removed from the trustee of the asset protection trust. Because the managers and members of a Nevis LLC are not public information, the creator of the trust is able to assume control over the assets without disclosing his control on any public records.

=== Channel Islands (Guernsey and Jersey) ===
The Channel Islands have been long regarded as being the first jurisdictions to develop an offshore finance industry, each is often regarded as being one of the best quality jurisdictions to use. Fully compliant with anti money laundering laws, sharing taxation information with an increasing number of countries, modern case law indicate that creditors, who have a rightful claim, are able to freeze trust assets in the Channel Islands. Tax law initiatives in the UK have largely eliminated the tax advantages of British citizens placing assets in trust in the Channel Islands, which in the early years had been a source of business. While the Channel Islands enjoys a modern banking sector, most attorneys do not regard the Channel Islands as appropriate for asset protection planning(why?).

The judicial systems of the Channel Islands are split into two distinct Bailiwicks. The Bailiwick of Jersey, and the Bailiwick of Guernsey (which includes the islands of Guernsey, Alderney Sark, and Herm). The legal systems in each island follows a dual system based on Norman-French codified law overlaid with elements of English common law. Whilst specialised training is required in order to practice law in each of the Bailiwicks, the Bar is not open to everyone, the quality of the judiciary is generally considered very good, if not very expensive. Regulation of Fiduciary companies and the related banking and investment services offered in the Channel Islands is also considered good to excellent.

History

The Channel Islands are a popular jurisdiction for the establishment of trusts for investment purposes, given the tax friendly obligations on trust income and assets and a robust tax law which supports confidentiality in relation to trust administration. These benefits have encouraged many high-net-worth families to establish trusts in the Channel Islands.

Another drawcard of the Channel Islands is that it has a reputation as a credible trusts jurisdiction as a result of the courts of Guernsey and Jersey hearing and deciding on numerous trusts issues facing trusts practitioners throughout the world. The establishment of a trust structure in the Channel Islands is therefore generally thought of as a sound investment decision and those looking to do so expect a high degree of certainty in terms of the court's approach to the law and disputes should they emerge.

However recent litigation before the Guernsey Royal Court in Investec Trust (Guernsey) Limited & Anor v Glenalla Properties Limited & Ors sounds a note of caution to those looking to protect their assets within a Channel Islands trust. It may be that a trustee, or even former trustee, can take trust assets to satisfy their legal costs, or even remuneration, without regard to the value of the trust fund and at any time, including long after their removal as trustee.

The trust at the centre of a current dispute on this particular issue is a Jersey law trust known as the TDT. Over 10 years after their removal in July 2010, the former trustees, ITG Limited and Bayeux Limited (which are subsidiaries of Investec Bank), have made a claim of around £28 million against the assets of the trust chiefly comprising litigation costs incurred over a 12-year period. The claim is challenged by the current trustees.

Following an eight-day hearing in December 2020 (which caused further hundreds of thousands of pounds in legal fees to be incurred), the Guernsey Royal Court will rule on the extent to which the current trustees’ challenges will be allowed or struck out. The case presents the Royal Court with an opportunity to provide much-needed clarification for beneficiaries and the trust industry on the extent to which courts will go to protect the trust fund from exhaustion as a result of claims by trustees for their costs. The current authority on point is the Jersey Court of Appeal's decision in Alhamrani v JP Morgan Trust Company. Alhamrani allows a trustee (and former trustee) to take their costs from trust assets unless they can be shown to be “unreasonably incurred”. But in practice what an “unreasonably incurred” cost will be is highly controversial. Investec are arguing for an interpretation which would generously favour trustees and even go so far as allowing them to leave it to their lawyers to dictate and control legal spend, which for a regulated entity is nothing less than extraordinary.

If such an approach was to find favour with the Royal Court, settlors and beneficiaries would be well advised to consider whether they ultimately have the protections they thought they did, and reforms directed towards the incurrence of trust related expenses and in particular controls in respect of litigation costs may well be needed. In England and Wales Cost-Capping Orders are available to parties in litigation involving trusts and courts regularly encourage or order litigants to engage in alternative dispute resolution. If a trustee (or former trustee) incurs legal fees without regard to the overall expense to the trust, then it is quite likely that it will carry the majority of those costs itself as recovery would be limited.

With various reforms in England and Wales aimed at keeping litigation costs reasonable, it is high time for the lawmakers of the Channel Islands to follow suit and ensure that trustees (and their lawyers) are not given an open cheque book to spend trust funds in litigation without regard to the value of trust assets at their disposal or the interests of the true owners of those assets.

=== Switzerland and Liechtenstein ===
Switzerland and Liechtenstein are noteworthy for large banking sectors and sophisticated wealth management services. While both countries now recognize trusts (particularly trusts established under the laws of another jurisdiction, such as Nevis), there is no available case law yet which indicates how the courts of those two countries will enforce offshore asset protection trust laws.

Many attorneys establish asset protection trusts under the laws of another country and deposit the trust assets in Switzerland or Liechtenstein. One question raised by this approach is whether a creditor can seize assets in Switzerland or Liechtenstein without having to bring a claim in the trust-protective jurisdiction. Again, a lack of precedent suggests that this is an open issue in Switzerland and Liechtenstein.

Both countries are also known for offering asset protection annuities, with a six-month statute of limitations on fraudulent transfers into an annuity. Unfortunately for most Americans, these annuities cannot invest in US securities without punitive taxation due to the offshore status of the insurance carriers that offer these annuity products. Furthermore, many lawyers peddling these annuity products to their clients collect commissions from the insurance carriers. These reasons, among others, may help explain why annuities offered in these two countries are not particularly popular with U.S. persons. This does not mean that taxpayers of other jurisdictions may not significantly benefit from holding a Swiss or Liechtenstein annuity. Also, U.S. persons may benefit from holding an annuity issued by a carrier in an asset-protective jurisdiction (such as the Cook Islands), particularly if the carrier is an electing 953(d) carrier (a reference to a provision of US tax law).

== Challenges ==
Whether such a trust is a spendthrift trust on the U.S. model, a protective trust on the Commonwealth model or another form of discretionary trust, it is more likely to be subject to challenge under the common law doctrine of sham or under specific statutory provisions if any person setting up the trust (or their spouse and their spouse in turn as in a reciprocal trust):

- can benefit under its provisions;
- is the person under risk financially;
- benefits (whether permitted or not) from the trust; or
- if the person setting up the trust is at risk financially, if bankruptcy or divorce occurs soon after the establishment of the trust (fraudulent conveyance).

Offshore trusts and other asset protection vehicles typically do not prevent action against the individual concerned in his or her home country. Orders under divorce and creditor protection laws can typically be made against that individual notwithstanding the alleged independence of such trustees. If a judge determines that the trust settlor controls the assets of the offshore trust, the judge may order the settlor to repatriate the trust assets. Failure to comply with the court's order may lead to a finding of contempt of court and imprisonment. For this reason, a properly established asset protection trust should provide a clear separation between the settlor and those who exercise control over the trust assets.

=== US v. Grant ===
The most recent case to rule on the merits of a contempt order is US v. Grant. In 2005, a federal district court in Miami ordered a domestic protector of an offshore asset protection trust, under threat of contempt, to exercise her power to replace the foreign trustee with a domestic trustee chosen by the court. The ruling, U.S. v. Grant Case No. 00-08986-Civ-Jordan (D.C. So. Fla. 2005), threatened to draw into question the viability of an asset-protection trust if a domestic protector could be compelled to appoint a domestic trustee to marshal the assets and bring them within the purview of the domestic court proceedings.

In May 2008, the U.S. government sought to hold the domestic protector in contempt of court for failing to secure the cooperation of the foreign trustee to resign and repatriate the trust assets. The U.S. District Court for the Southern District of Florida ruled against the government, finding that the domestic protector could not be held in contempt for failure to gain the cooperation of the offshore trustee. In denying the government's contempt motion, the judge observed:

"I understand that it has been more than two years since the repatriation order was issued and that the funds had not yet been repatriated. But this failure is not for a lack of effort. I am reluctant to fault Mrs. Grant for her trustees' denial of her requests to repatriate the funds." U.S. v. Grant, 2008 U.S. Dist. LEXIS 51332, 101 A.F. T.R.2d (RIA) 2676 (D.C. So. Fla. 2008).

For years, lawyers have vigorously debated the vulnerability of an asset protection trust with a domestic protector. The Grant case stands for the proposition that no vulnerability exists if the domestic protector complies with the court's orders. While a domestic protector may be required to make an effort to repatriate trust assets, failure to achieve repatriation should not entail any dire consequences to the trust or to the domestic protector. As long as a duress clause permits the foreign trustee to ignore the pleas of a domestic protector acting under threat of a contempt order, the selection of a domestic protector should not jeopardize the integrity of the offshore asset protection trust.

While most attorneys draft trust agreements to limit the domestic protector's powers to those of a negative nature (i.e., the domestic protector may veto trustee decisions, but a domestic protector cannot order a trustee to do anything), the ruling in Grant implies that even positive powers exercisable by a domestic protector may not jeopardize an offshore asset protection trust containing a duress clause. Whether this leads attorneys to be more cavalier in their trust drafting remains to be seen. At least we know that traditional offshore asset protection trust planning works as anticipated.

== Taxation ==
There are rigorous US tax reporting requirements that apply to taxpayers who establish offshore trusts. While no additional tax is usually imposed, certain forms of asset protection trusts require full disclosure of all trust assets and activities on the U.S. contributor's tax returns. Confidentiality is usually not enjoyed under these arrangements.

Most asset protection trusts established by U.S. settlors are considered "grantor trusts" under U.S. income tax law, meaning that all income of the trust is reportable on the grantor's (i.e., the settlor's) individual income tax return. Asset-protection trusts do not, in and of themselves, offer any tax advantages under U.S. income tax law.

== See also ==
- Asset protection
- Offshore trust
