= Hague Trust Convention =

1985 treaty on international trust law

Convention of 1 July 1985 on the Law Applicable to Trusts and on their Recognition
- Party (common law) Party (civil law) Signatory that did not ratify
- Signed: 1 July 1985
- Location: Netherlands
- Effective: 1 January 1992
- Condition: ratification by 3 states
- Parties: 14
- Depositary: Ministry of Foreign Affairs (Netherlands)
- Languages: French and English

The Hague Convention on the Law Applicable to Trusts and on their Recognition, or Hague Trust Convention is a multilateral treaty developed by the Hague Conference on Private International Law on the Law Applicable to Trusts. It concluded on 1 July 1985, entered into force 1 January 1992, and is as of September 2017 ratified by 14 countries. The Convention uses a harmonised definition of a trust, which is the subject of the convention, and sets conflict rules for resolving problems in the choice of the applicable law. The key provisions of the Convention are:

- each party recognises the existence and validity of trusts. However, the Convention only relates to trusts with a written trust instrument. It would not apply trusts which arise (usually in common law jurisdictions) without a written trust instrument.
- the Convention sets out the characteristics of trusts under the convention.
- the Convention sets out clear rules for determining the governing law of trusts with a cross-border element.

== Background ==
Many states do not have a developed law of trusts, or the principles differ significantly between states. It was therefore necessary for the Hague Convention to define a trust to indicate the range of legal transactions regulated by the Convention and, perhaps more significantly, the range of applications not regulated. The definition offered in Article 2 is:

...the legal relationship created, inter vivos or on death, by a person, the settlor, when assets have been placed under the control of a trustee for the benefit of a beneficiary or for a specified purpose.
A trust has the following characteristics:

(a) the assets constitute a separate fund and are not a part of the trustee's own estate;
(b) title to the trust assets stands in the name of the trustee or in the name of another person on behalf of the trustee;
(c) the trustee has the power and the duty, in respect of which he is accountable, to manage, employ or dispose of the assets in accordance with the terms of the trust and the special duties imposed upon him by law. The reservation by the settlor of certain rights and powers, and the fact that the trustee may himself have rights as a beneficiary, are not necessarily inconsistent with the existence of a trust.

Article 3 provides that the Convention only applies to express trusts created voluntarily and evidenced in writing. It will therefore not cover oral trusts, resulting trusts, constructive trusts, statutory trusts or trusts created by judicial order. But signatory states are free to apply the Convention to any form of trust. There are incidental question problems if the trust is testamentary and, under Article 4, if it is alleged that the testator lacked capacity, or that the will is formally or substantively invalid, or that it had been revoked, these issues must be determined first under the lex fori Conflict rules on characterisation and choice of law before the Convention rules can apply. This will include, for example, a detailed consideration of any marriage settlement or applicable law containing community property provisions which might prevent the testator alienating property from a spouse or child of the family (see succession (conflict)). Obviously, if the will purporting to create the trust is held invalid, there are no trusts to adjudicate upon.

== The applicable law ==
Article 6 allows the settlor to select the applicable law in the inter vivos or testamentary document. Under normal circumstances, the settlor will be acting on professional advice and will make an express selection or it will be implied from the facts of the case. But, under Article 6(2), if the settlor selects a law with no relevant provisions or the provisions in the municipal law selected would be inappropriate, or there is no selection, Article 7 applies to select the law which is most closely connected with the transaction. This is judged by reference to four alternative connecting factors which are to be considered as at the time the putative trust is created:

1. the place where the trust is to be administered;
2. the place where the assets are to be found (for immovables, there is no problem – the lex situs is easily identified; for movables, the most common form is choses in action such as shares and bonds, and their location does not change (bearer bonds and other instruments where title is determined by mere possession are relatively uncommon), but for tangible assets, this will usually be the place where the assets are located at the time of the hearing given that this represents the place where any Court Order would have to be enforced: see property (conflict));
3. the place where the trustee is resident or conducts his or her business;
4. the place where the purpose or object of the trust is to be fulfilled.

Despite the identification of these four factors, the court must actually perform a rounded evaluation of all the circumstances. Thus, it would be relevant to consider the distribution of the assets if in separate states, the purpose of the trust (which might be the evasion of taxation or other provisions in some of the states where the assets are located), the lex domicilii or lex patriae of the settlor and the beneficiaries (particularly if the legal transaction is a marriage settlement or testamentary), the legal form of the document, and the law of the place where the document was executed (this latter factor may either be accidental and so of marginal value, or contrived to take advantage of a favourable law and so highly significant).

=== The scope of the applicable law ===
Under Article 8, the law specified by Article 6 or 7 shall govern the validity of the trust, its construction, its effects, and the administration of the trust. In particular that law shall govern:

(a) the appointment, resignation and removal of trustees, the capacity to act as a trustee, and the devolution of the office of trustee;
(b) the rights and duties of trustees among themselves;
(c) the right of trustees to delegate in whole or in part the discharge of their duties or the exercise of their powers;
(d) the power of trustees to administer or to dispose of trust assets, to create security interests in the trust assets, or to acquire new assets;
(e) the powers of investment of trustees;
(f) restrictions upon the duration of the trust, and upon the power to accumulate the income of the trust;
(g) the relationships between the trustees and the beneficiaries including the personal liability of the trustees to the beneficiaries;
(h) the variation of termination of the trust (because variation is expressly within the scope of the Applicable Law, this may be a significant factor in any issue of forum non conveniens raised if an application to vary is made to a forum other than a forum of the Applicable Law);
(i) the distribution of the trust assets;
(j) the duty of trustees to account for their administration.

=== Severance ===
Articles 9 and 10 allow the Applicable Law by which the validity of the trust has been established, to sever aspects of the trust and its administration so that separate laws shall apply to each component. In fact, the settlor may expressly select an Applicable Law for each component and the forum court should respect his or her wishes. But, in general terms, it is desirable that a single law should be applied to the administration and the fact that there may be assets located in separate states should not, per se, justify severing the trust. The relevant lex situs can be applied to micromanage the asset(s) by the trustee(s) without having to apply the situs law to the administration of the trust in that state. Equally, this is not an argument for a judicial approach which favours the law of the place of administration as the Applicable Law. Although the administration must comply with the municipal laws for general purposes, the duty to honour the intentions of the settlor may make the law of the place where the most significant part of that intention is to be realised the most significant single law.

=== Recognition ===
Under Article 11, a trust complying with the Applicable Law shall be recognised as a trust which implies, as a minimum, that the trust property constitutes a separate fund, that the trustee may sue and be sued in his capacity as trustee, and that he or she may appear or act in this capacity before a notary or any person acting in an official capacity. In so far as the law applicable to the trust requires or provides, this recognition implies in particular:

(a) that personal creditors of the trustee shall have no recourse against the trust assets;
(b) that the trust assets shall not form part of the trustee's estate upon his insolvency or bankruptcy;
(c) that the trust assets shall not form part of the matrimonial property of the trustee or his spouse nor part of the trustee's estate upon his death;
(d) that the trust assets may be recovered when the trustee, in breach of trust, has mingled trust assets with his own property or has alienated trust assets.

However, the rights and obligations of any third party holder of the assets shall remain subject to the law determined by the choice of law rules of the lex fori. Thus, although the Convention makes provision for the trustee(s) and any third parties, it fails to address the position of the beneficiaries who, for example, might wish to pursue assets intermixed with the trustee's personal property through actions for tracing. One of the problems that beneficiaries might encounter is addressed in Article 12 which considers the problem where the situs law does not have a title registration system which reflects ownership registration in a representative capacity. While recognising that the Convention cannot require states to modify their existing registers, it provides that the trustee shall be entitled, in so far as this is not prohibited by or inconsistent with the law of the State where registration is sought, to do so in his capacity as trustee or in such other way that the existence of the trust is disclosed. This implicitly recognises the desirability of all registration systems distinguishing between beneficial and representative titles.

This general difficulty of municipal laws failure to support trusts is addressed in Article 13, which considers the situation of those who wish to create a trust but can only do so by invoking laws entirely outside their own state. As an application of comity, no forum state is bound to recognise a trust the significant elements of which, except for the choice of the applicable law, the place of administration and the habitual residence of the trustee, are more closely connected with States which do not have the institution of the trust or the category of trust involved. But, because this could be interpreted as an invitation not to validate otherwise perfectly appropriate financial arrangements for deserving beneficiaries, Article 14 provides that the Convention shall not prevent the application of rules of law more favourable to the recognition of trusts. This reflects the positive rules of public policy which require that the validity of a transaction (whether commercial or not) be upheld if at all possible where this will give effect to the reasonable expectations of the parties. The only exceptions shall be where this will produce consequences offending against the mandatory policies of the forum court in which case Article 18 empowers the court to deny the Applicable Law, even if it has been expressly selected by the settlor. But Article 15(2) nevertheless requires the forum court to consider adopting an approach that will preserve the overall validity of the trust insofar as that generality does not offend against the mandatory policy.

== States parties ==
As of September 2017, 14 countries have ratified the convention: Australia, Cyprus, Canada (9 provinces: all except Quebec, and none of the territories), China (Hong Kong only), Italy, Luxembourg, Liechtenstein, Malta, Monaco, the Netherlands (European territory only), Panama, San Marino, Switzerland and the United Kingdom (including 12 dependent territories/crown dependencies: Akrotiri and Dhekelia, Bermuda, British Antarctic Territory, British Virgin Islands, Falkland Islands, Gibraltar, Guernsey, Isle of Man, Jersey, Montserrat, Saint Helena, South Georgia & South Sandwich Islands and Turks and Caicos Islands).
