= Directed trust =

A directed trust is an investment trust in which the trustee is directed by a number of other trust participants in implementing the trust's execution. That trustee is referred to as a Directed Trustee. Examples of other trust participants include a distribution committee, trust protector, or investment advisor. A directed trustee's role often includes: following distribution and investment instructions, holding legal title to the trust assets, providing fiduciary and tax accounting, coordinating trust participants and offering dispute resolution among those participants. Typically, these duties and the other participants in the trust are defined and governed by the trust document itself.
