= Spendthrift trust =

Trust in which the assets are controlled by a third party and not the beneficiary

In trust law, a spendthrift trust is a trust that is created for the benefit of a person (often unable to control his/her spending) that gives an independent trustee full authority to make decisions as to how the trust funds may be spent for the benefit of the beneficiary. Creditors of the beneficiary generally cannot reach the funds in the trust, and the funds are not actually under the control of the beneficiary.

The creator of a trust is often called the "trustor", "grantor", or "settlor" of the trust. A trust generally will not be treated as a spendthrift trust unless the trust agreement contains language showing that the creator intended the trust to qualify as spendthrift. This is what is known as a spendthrift clause or spendthrift provision.

A spendthrift provision creates an irrevocable trust preventing creditors from attaching the interest of the beneficiary in the trust before that interest (cash or property) is actually distributed to him or her. Most well-drafted irrevocable trusts contain spendthrift provisions even though the beneficiaries are not known to be spendthrifts. This is because such a provision protects the trust and the beneficiary in the event a beneficiary is sued and a judgment creditor attempts to attach the beneficiary's interest in the trust.

The protection of the spendthrift trust extends solely to the property that is in the trust. Once the property has been distributed to the beneficiary that property can be reached by a creditor, except to the extent the distributed property is used to support the beneficiary.

== Necessaries, child support and alimony ==
Some creditors may compel payment out of the trust, particularly those who supply the beneficiary with "necessaries" (usually food and shelter, but sometimes clothing and transportation, if these are not extravagant). Most jurisdictions also permit the invasion of spendthrift trust assets to satisfy awards of child support and alimony.

== Self-settlement ==
A trust created by an individual for his or her own benefit is sometimes called a "self-settled trust", and may be a kind of asset-protection trust. If the creator of a self-settled trust is also a beneficiary of the trust, particular problems arise regarding the protection of assets from creditors, and the prevention of fraud, that is, the possibility that the creator of the trust seeks to defraud creditors.

=== Limited protection ===
To prevent individuals from creating trusts to defeat their own creditors, the laws of most states provide that a spendthrift clause in a trust document does not protect the beneficiary to the extent that the beneficiary is also the person who created the trust. The settlor does not need to be either the sole settlor or the only beneficiary of the trust. As long as the settlor is a beneficiary of the trust to any extent, to that extent the trust will be deemed self-settled. For example, Texas law provides:

(d) If the settlor is also a beneficiary of the trust, a provision restraining the voluntary or involuntary transfer of his beneficial interest does not prevent his creditors from satisfying claims from his interest in the trust estate.

Further, laws in some states (like Texas) are worded so broadly that anyone transferring property to the trust might be deemed to be a "creator" (i.e., settlor, grantor, or trustor), not merely the person or persons who originally set up the trust.

=== Domestic asset protection trusts ===
Several states have changed their laws to provide that a person may create a self-settled spendthrift trust (i.e., a spendthrift trust for his or her own benefit). Such trusts are also called Domestic Asset Protection Trusts ("DAPT"), and sometimes informally called "Alaska trusts", as Alaska was a pioneer in allowing this kind of spendthrift trust. However, because of the danger of the misuse of Alaska trusts to defraud creditors, the legality of such trusts (to the extent that they purport to protect the trust share of a beneficiary who is also a creator of the trust) is uncertain in the states not allowing self-settled spendthrift trusts.

Nevada has enacted a series of statutes, codified at Chapter 166 of the Nevada Revised Statutes, that specifically enable the creation of self-settled spendthrift trusts. This form of trust is commonly referred to as a "Nevada Asset Protection Trust". Under Chapter 166, an individual can serve as the settlor, trustee, and beneficiary of the trust. This network of laws is specifically designed to protect trust assets from the claims of any creditor. NRS 166.170 specifically limits the circumstances under which a creditor may bring a claim. If a creditor existed at the time of the property's transfer to the trust, then the creditor must bring its claim against the trust within 2 years after the transfer or within six months after the creditor reasonably should have known of the transfer, whichever is later. NRS 166.170(1). If the creditor's claim surfaces after the transfer is made, the creditor must bring its claim within two years after the transfer, regardless of notice. NRS 166.170(1). Moreover, the creditor can only sustain its claim if it can prove by clear and convincing evidence (a tough evidentiary standard) that the transfer was made as a fraudulent conveyance. NRS 166.170(3).

The extent to which other states will recognize the asset protections of these DAPTs, like those created under the laws of Nevada and Alaska, is unclear due to a somewhat sparse body of relevant case law. While states are generally compelled to honor and recognize the laws of sister states, pursuant to the full faith and credit clause of the United States Constitution, some of these laws may be in direct conflict with the laws of other states. Some of these DAPT laws can be quite expansive. The scope of the Nevada law is drawn quite broadly to govern Nevada's enforcement of all trusts created within or outside the state, so long as they meet certain limited criteria. See NRS 166.015(1). The law goes on to require that the statutes be applied to the enforcement by any other state of any spendthrift trust created within Nevada, so long as the law is not in direct conflict with the other adjudicating state. NRS 166.015(3). In fact, the Nevada law does not even require that the trust assets be located within Nevada, so long as one of the trustees declares his/her domicile as Nevada. NRS 166.015(1)(d).

The following other states now have a DAPT statute: Delaware, Mississippi (as of July 31, 2014, see Miss. Code 91-9-701 et seq.), South Dakota, Wyoming, Tennessee, Utah, Oklahoma, Colorado, Missouri, Rhode Island and New Hampshire.

== In the United States ==
Because estates and trusts are largely governed by state law in the United States, individual states each may have their own statutory or common law treatments of spendthrift clauses and trusts.

For example, the Nevada Property Code provides:

- There is no personal or corporate income tax imposed by the state of Nevada.
- An Irrevocable Spendthrift Trust, if properly formed in the State of Nevada, is currently not subject to income taxes of other States, as long as the Nevada Spendthrift Trust is qualified to do business in the other State(s).
- A Nevada Spendthrift Trust is only subject to Federal Income Tax.
- The Settlor has the right to change or add other beneficiaries at any time without notification to any beneficiary past or present, the state of Nevada, or the Federal Government.
- All rights and privileges of a Spendthrift Trust formed in the State of Nevada are clearly set out in a concise set of statutes in Nevada and are not dependent on court decisions or interpretations for the validity of the Trust.
- There are no registration fees, annual reporting fees, or any other recurring fees charged by the State of Nevada or any local Government for the continued validity of the Trust. The Trusts are also not required to retain a Resident Agent in the State of Nevada.

In Texas, the Texas Property Code provides:

(a) A settlor may provide in the terms of the trust that the interest of a beneficiary in the income or in the principal or in both may not be voluntarily or involuntarily transferred before payment or delivery of the interest to the beneficiary by the trustee.

A clause in the terms of a trust agreement that complies with the above-quoted statute is an example of what the law calls an "anti-alienation provision."

To continue with the example of the Texas law, the Texas Property Code further provides:

(b) A declaration in a trust instrument that the interest of a beneficiary shall be held subject to a "spendthrift trust" is sufficient to restrain voluntary or involuntary alienation of the interest by a beneficiary to the maximum extent permitted by this subtitle.

(c) A trust containing terms authorized under Subsection (a) or (b) of this section may be referred to as a spendthrift trust.

The above-quoted language essentially means that a trust instrument does not (at least, in Texas) have to contain complex legal jargon to qualify the trust as "spendthrift"; simply using the word "spendthrift" in the trust document may be sufficient.
