= Duty of Prudence =

Concept in trust law

In Trust Law, the Duty of Prudence traditionally includes the duty of a trustee to administer a trust with a degree of care, skill and caution. The degree of care required depends both on the jurisdiction on the trustee's actual or purported skill, for example if they have an accounting background (or claimed to have one), they must exercise professional care. At a minimum, a trustee is required to act with the care of a "prudent person" would in dealing with the assets of another, given the purposes, terms, and other circumstances of the trust.

Many jurisdictions have codified specific extensions or interpretations to this duty, for example related to investments, the Uniform Prudent Investor Act adopted in many U.S. states requires the application of modern portfolio theory in diversifying investment.
