= QTIP Trust =

QTIP trust is a type of trust and an estate planning tool used in the United States. "QTIP" is short for "Qualified Terminable Interest Property." A QTIP trust is often used in order to take advantage of the marital deduction and still control the ultimate distribution of the assets at the death of the surviving spouse.

== Overview ==
In the U.S., each citizen is granted a credit against the gift and estate tax. When gifts and bequests exceed the amount of this credit, a tax is imposed.

For estate tax purposes, any property which passes to a decedent's surviving spouse is not subject to the gift or estate tax; however, generally full ownership of this property must in fact pass to the surviving spouse. A transfer through a QTIP Trust is an exception to this general rule. Under Section 2056 of the Internal Revenue Code, as long as the surviving spouse has a lifetime income interest in the property, the property is treated as passing to the surviving spouse.

The concept of a "QTIP trust" exists only for federal gift and estate tax purposes, and from a state law perspective, such a trust does not differ from any other trust except that it must meet the requirements of the Internal Revenue Code. States which levy an estate tax may also recognize the trust.

== Illustration ==
For example, if a Grandpa gives $100,000 to Grandma, this would be a gift to a spouse, exempt from the gift and estate tax. However, if Grandpa were to give the $100,000 to Grandson, this would be included for gift and estate tax purposes. However, Grandpa can place this $100,000 in a QTIP trust which will make payments of money to Grandma during her life, and have the money in the trust pass to Grandson when Grandma dies. This is treated as a marital gift to Grandma, exempt from the gift and estate tax, to the extent of any property received. The amount passing to the Grandson upon the death of Grandma will be included in Grandma's estate for estate tax consideration.

== Practical use ==
QTIP trusts are commonly used when a spouse has children from another marriage. The other spouse may wish to provide for this spouse and take advantage of the spouse's unified credit against gift and estate tax, but nonetheless designate where the money will go after that spouse is deceased. A QTIP trust allows this to be accomplished in a manner treated as a gift to a spouse.

== See also ==
- Estate planning
- Inheritance
- Trusts and estates
