= Trust instrument =

Legal document establishing a trust

In trust law, a trust instrument (also sometimes called a deed of trust, where executed by way of deed) is an instrument in writing executed by a settlor used to constitute a trust. Trust instruments are generally only used in relation to an inter vivos trust; testamentary trusts are usually created under a will. (Note: Although not always. It is possible for the deceased to convey property to trustees upon death which perfects a trust. See also secret trusts.)

== Formalities ==
Although in most legal systems there are certain formalities associated with settling a trust, most legal systems impose few, if any, structures on the trust instrument itself. Historically, the concept of a trust is the intervention of the courts of equity to prevent a legal owner treating the property as beneficially his own; provided that state of affairs exists, a trust arises notwithstanding any lack of formality in relation to the form of the trust instrument.

However, notwithstanding the flexible approach taken by the law, characteristically the legal profession has taken an extremely formalised approach to trust instruments. Not only are they invariably always executed under seal as a deed, but frequently the initial trust fund (usually a nominal amount), will actually be physically affixed to the trust instrument itself to prove that the initial trust property was transferred.

Some slightly unusual practices have arisen in relation to the drafting of trust instruments which, again, are rigidly adhered to by professionals in many common-law countries (although not the U.S.A.). For example, trust deeds will generally avoid all punctuation (including full stops) - to avoid confusion, all new sentences commence with a new, numbered, paragraph. Dates, including years, are conventionally spelled out in words rather than using figures.

Part of the over-formalisation which attends the creation of trusts is justified by the significant tax implications which may follow if a trust were to be subsequently held to be void, as most professionally drafted trust instruments are prepared as a part of tax mitigation schemes.

Most jurisdictions do not require trust instruments to be publicly filed (in contrast to wills). But in many jurisdictions they are subject to stamp duty.

== Provisions ==
The provisions of a trust instrument will vary according to the type of trust, and the nature of the trust property.

- A bare trust over a single asset will characteristically have very few provisions.
- A discretionary trust over a mixed bag of investments will usually have far greater provisions regulation the exercise and management of the trust fund.
- A trust which is set up as a unit trust will have additional specific provisions specific to the calculation of the NAV and acquisition and redemption of units.
- Settled land act settlements have specific provisions relating to the underlying subject matter.
- Trusts which are set up to protect vulnerable beneficiaries, such as blind trusts or spendthrift trusts will have specific provisions relating to the nature of the beneficiaries.

However, in general, most trust instruments will have provisions which address the following aspects of the administration of the trust:

1. The name of the settlement and definitions and interpretation provisions
2. The legal nature of the trust (i.e. a trust for sale)
3. Powers to add and exclude beneficiaries
4. Trusts over property added to the trust fund
5. Power of appointment (i.e. distribution)
6. Trusts in default of appointment, and, sometimes, ultimate default trusts
7. General administrative powers of the trustees
8. Extended power of maintenance
9. Extended power of advancement
10. Usually, a trustee charging clause
11. Regulation of the appointment of new trustees
12. The proper law and forum and place of administration for the settlement
13. Often, an exclusion of settlor (and spouse) from benefiting from the trust (where required for tax reasons)
14. Usually, an indemnity for the trustees out of the trust fund

Most trust instruments will then also have two schedules:

1. a schedule setting out the powers of the trustees (often in addition to any powers granted or implied by operation of law)
2. a summary of the initial trust fund (usually a nominal amount of money)

== See also ==
- Asset-protection trust
- Back-bond in Scotland
- Blind trust
- Express trust
- Inter vivos trust
- Offshore trust
- Protective trust
- Spendthrift trust
- Testamentary trust
- Unit trust
