= Power of appointment =

Term

A power of appointment is a term most frequently used in the law of wills to describe the ability of the testator (the person writing the will) to select a person who will be given the authority to dispose of certain property under the will. Although any person can exercise this power at any time during their life, its use is rare outside of a will. The power is divided into two broad categories: general powers of appointment and special powers of appointment. The holder of a power of appointment differs from the trustee of a trust in that the former has no obligation to manage the property for the generation of income, but need only distribute it.

== General power of appointment ==
Example: "I leave my video game collection to be distributed as my son Andrew sees fit."

In the United States of America, a general power of appointment is defined for federal estate tax purposes in the Internal Revenue Code §2041. A general power of appointment is one that allows the holder of the power to appoint to himself, his estate, his creditors, or the creditors of his or her estate the right to have the beneficial use and enjoyment of certain property covered by the power of appointment. The holder of a general power of appointment is treated for estate tax purposes as if he or she is the owner of the property subject to the power, regardless of whether or not the power is exercised. Thus, the property that is subject to the power is includable in the power holder's estate for estate tax purposes.

A general power of appointment is a key element of a type of marital deduction tax law as prescribed in Internal Revenue Code §2056(b)(5). It is a trust that qualifies for the marital deduction, provided that the surviving spouse is given the income at least annually and the surviving spouse has a general power of appointment over the trust property remaining at his death.

Most general powers of appointment are exercisable under a will. The holder of the power refers to the document creating the power in his or her will and designates who among the permissible objects of the power should receive the property. The power could be exercised by creating further trusts.

If the power of appointment is not exercised, the default provision of the document that created the power takes over.

== Special power of appointment ==
Example: "I leave my cactus collection to my children, my wife Pat to choose who receives which cactus."

A special power of appointment allows the recipient to distribute the designated property among a specified group or class of people, not including donee, donee's estate, creditors of donee, or creditors of donee's estate. For example, a testator might grant his brother the special power to distribute property among the testator's three children. The brother would then have the authority to choose which of the testator's children gets which property. Unlike a general power of appointment, the refusal of the appointed party to exercise a specific power of appointment causes the designated property to revert as a gift to the members of a group or a class.

A special power of appointment may be exclusive or nonexclusive. If exclusive, the donee can appoint all the property to one or more members of the class of permissible appointees to the exclusion of the other members of the class. If nonexclusive, the donee must appoint some property to each object.

Special powers of appointment also appear in the context of a trust and are primarily used to reduce liability for generation-skipping transfer tax, or to provide asset protection trust features without fraudulent conveyance liability. In the United States, such trusts are referred to as SPA Trusts.

== Testamentary power and power presently exercisable ==
In addition to general and special powers, donors may limit when the power may be exercised by the donees. Testamentary powers are usually indicated by the inclusion of limiting language in the granting instrument such as "to B for life, remainder to persons as B shall 'by will' appoint". General powers presently exercisable do not contain such limitations on power. Wording such as "to B for life, and upon B's death to those that B shall appoint" indicates a power presently exercisable, not a testamentary power.

In some jurisdictions, the donee's creditors cannot reach the appointive property when the donee has a presently exercisable power of appointment as long as the power is unexercised.
