= Testamentary trust =

Trust created by a will

A testamentary trust (sometimes referred to as a will trust or trust under will) is a trust which arises upon the death of the testator, and which is specified in their will. A will may contain more than one testamentary trust, and may address all or any portion of the estate. A testamentary trust is an irrevocable trust established and funded pursuant to the terms of a deceased person's will.

Testamentary trusts are distinguished from inter vivos trusts, which are created during the settlor's lifetime.

There are four parties involved in a testamentary trust:

- The person who specifies that the trust be created, usually as a part of their will, but it may be set up in abeyance during the person's lifetime. This person may be called the grantor or trustor, but is usually referred to as the settlor.
- The trustee, whose duty is to carry out the terms of the will. They may be named in the will, or may be appointed by the probate court that handles the will.
- The beneficiary(s), who will receive the benefits of the trust.
- Although not a party to the trust itself, the probate court is a necessary component of the trust's activity. It oversees the trustee's handling of the trust.

A testamentary trust is a legal arrangement created as specified in a person's will, and is occasioned by the death of that person. It is created to address any estate accumulated during that person's lifetime or generated as a result of a postmortem lawsuit, such as a settlement in a survival claim, or the proceeds from a life insurance policy held on the settlor. A trust can be created to oversee such assets. A trustee is appointed to direct the trust until a set time when the trust expires, such as when minor beneficiaries reach a specified age or accomplish a deed such as completing a set educational goal or achieving a specified matrimonial status.

For a testamentary trust, as the settlor is deceased, they will generally not have any influence over the trustee's exercise of discretion, although in some jurisdictions it is common for the testator to leave a letter of wishes for the trustee. In practical terms testamentary trusts tend to be driven more by the needs of the beneficiaries (particularly infant beneficiaries) than by tax considerations, which are the usual considerations in inter vivos trusts.

If a testamentary trust fails, the property usually will be held on resulting trusts for the testator's residuary estate. Some famous English trust law cases were on behalf of the residuary legatees under a will seeking to have testamentary trusts declared void so as to inherit the trust property. An infamous example is Re Diplock [1951] Ch 253, which resulted in the suicide of one of the trustees who was personally liable to account for trust funds that had been disbursed for what he thought were perfectly valid charitable trusts.

== Advantages of a testamentary trust ==
- A testamentary trust provides a way for assets devolving to minor children to be protected until the children are capable of fending for themselves;
- A testamentary trust has low upfront costs, usually only the cost of preparing the will in such a way as to address the trust, and the fees involved in dealing with the judicial system during probate.

== Disadvantages of a testamentary trust ==
- The trustee is required to meet with the probate court regularly (at least annually in many jurisdictions) and prove that the trust is being handled in a responsible manner and in strict accordance with provisions of the will which created the trust. This may involve considerable legal fees, especially if the trust endures for several years or involves a sophisticated financial or investment structure, and always involves the fees imposed by the judicial system. Such fees and expenses are deducted from the principal of the estate;
- The trustee must be prepared to oversee the trust for its duration, which involves a considerable commitment in time, possible emotional attachment, and legal liability;
- A candidate for trustee may be named in the will, but that person has no legal obligation to accept the appointment. If no trustee is named in the will (or is unavailable, even if named), the probate court will appoint a trustee;
- It can be difficult for beneficiaries to bring a dishonest trustee to account. They may sue at law, or the malfeasance may be pointed out at the annual probate court review, but such remedies are slow, time-consuming and expensive, and are not guaranteed to succeed.

== Summary ==
Due to the potential problems, lawyers often advise that a revocable living trust or inter vivos trust be created instead of a testamentary trust. However, a testamentary trust may be a better solution if the expected estate is small compared to potential life insurance settlement amounts.
