= Beneficiary =

Person or other legal entity who receives money or other benefits from a benefactor

A beneficiary in the broadest sense refers to the benefit or advantage someone gets as the result of something else. Within finance, it refers to a person or other legal entity receiving money or other benefits from a benefactor. For example, the beneficiary of a life insurance policy is the person who receives the payment of the amount of insurance after the death of the insured. In trust law, beneficiaries are also known as cestui que use.

Most beneficiaries are designated in order to allocate where assets go when the owner(s) dies. However, if the primary beneficiary or beneficiaries are not alive or do not qualify under any conditions, the assets will probably pass to the contingent beneficiaries.

Conditions such as being married or over a certain age can be used by a benefactor to attempt to control the circumstances that must exist for the asset to pass to the beneficiaries. Some situations such as retirement accounts do not allow any restrictions, but trusts can sometimes be named as the beneficiary, with legally acceptable conditions created, in circumstances such as the beneficiary being very young or financially irresponsible.

The concept of a "beneficiary" will also frequently figure in contracts other than insurance policies. A third-party beneficiary of a contract is a person whom the parties intend to benefit from its provisions but who is not a party to the contract.

In the context of development aid, the term "beneficiaries" refer to the persons and the communities that receive and benefit from the projects created from the development aid.

== See also ==
- Beneficiary (trust)
- Beneficial ownership
- Birth certificate
- Estate planning
- Inheritance
- Legal fiction
- Registered owner
