= Settlor =

Person who entrusts their property for benefit of the beneficiary

In trust law, a settlor is a person who settles (i.e. gives into trust) their property for the benefit of the beneficiary. In some legal systems, a settlor is also referred to as a trustor, or occasionally, a grantor or donor. (Note: In common law legal systems outside of the United States, a donor usually refers to someone who grants a power other than a trust.) Where the trust is a testamentary trust, the settlor is usually referred to as the testator. The settlor may also be the trustee of the trust (where he declares that he holds his own property on trusts) or a third party may be the trustee (where he transfers the property to the trustee on trusts). In the common law of England and Wales, it has been held, controversially, that where a trustee declares an intention to transfer trust property to a trust of which he is one of several trustees, that is a valid settlement notwithstanding the property is not vested in the other trustees.

Capacity to be a trustee is generally co-extensive with the ability to hold and dispose of a legal or beneficial interest in property. In practice, special considerations arise only with respect to minors and mentally incapacitated persons.

A settlor may create a trust by manifesting an intention to create it. In most countries no formalities are required to create an inter vivos trust over personal property, but there are often formalities associated with trusts over real property, (Note: For example, in the United Kingdom, evidence in writing is required to create a trust in land, see section 53(1)(b) of the Law of Property Act 1925; although a failure to comply with the section renders the trust unenforceable and not void, see Gardner v Rowe (1828) 5 Russ 258) or testamentary trusts. (Note: In the United Kingdom, see section 9 of the Wills Act 1837, as amended by section 17 of the Administration of Justice Act 1982) The words or acts of the settlor must be sufficient to establish an intention that either another person or the settlor himself shall be trustee of the property on behalf of the beneficiary; a general intention to benefit another person on its own is sufficient. (Note: See for example Paul v Constance [1977] 1 WLR 521) These formalities apply to express trusts only, and not to resulting, implied or constructive trusts.

For a settlor to validly create a trust, in most common law legal systems they must satisfy the three certainties, established in Knight v Knight:

1. certainty of intention – whether the settlor (or testator) has manifested an intention to create a trust.
2. certainty of subject matter – whether the property identified as being settled is sufficiently accurately identified. (Note: Trust which have been held to fail include trusts over "the bulk of my estate" (Palmer v Simmonds (1854) 2 Drew 221), "such parts of my ... estate as she shall not have sold" (Re Jones [1898] 1 Ch 438), "anything that is left" (In the Estate of Last [1958] P 137) and "all my other houses" [meaning after prior legatees had chosen which houses they wished] (Boyce v Boyce (1849) 16 Sim 476). But these cases should be contrasted with those where the subject-matter of the gift is determined by the discretion of the trustees, for example, in Re Golay's Will Trusts [1965] 1 WLR 969, where a direction to allow a beneficiary to "enjoy one of my flats during her lifetime and to receive a reasonable income from my other properties" was upheld as the trustees could select and decide the matters: Certum est quod certum reddi potest.)
3. certainty of objects – the beneficiaries must be clearly ascertainable within the perpetuity period. (Note: "It is clear law that a trust (other than a charitable trust) must be for ascertainable beneficiaries", per Lord Denning in Re Vandervell's Trusts (No 2) [1974] Ch 269 at 319)

Where a settlement of property on a third party trustee by a settlor fails, the property is usually said to be held on resulting trusts for the settlor. However, if a settlor validly transfers property to a third party, and the words used are held not to create a trust, the usual rule is that the donee takes the property absolutely.

== See also ==
- Knight v Knight
- Express trust
- Offshore trust
- Taxation of trusts (United Kingdom)
- Trust law
