= 1960 in the United States =

- Decades: 1940s; 1950s; 1960s; 1970s; 1980s
- See also: History of the United States (1945–1964); Timeline of United States history (1950–1969); List of years in the United States

Events from the year 1960 in the United States.

== Incumbents ==
=== Federal government ===
- President: Dwight D. Eisenhower (R-Kansas/Pennsylvania)
- Vice President: Richard Nixon (R-California)
- Chief Justice: Earl Warren (California)
- Speaker of the House of Representatives: Sam Rayburn (D-Texas)
- Senate Majority Leader: Lyndon B. Johnson (D-Texas)
- Congress: 86th

==== State governments ====
Governors and lieutenant governors

=== Governors ===
- Governor of Alabama: John M. Patterson (Democratic)
- Governor of Alaska: William A. Egan (Democratic)
- Governor of Arizona: Paul Fannin (Republican)
- Governor of Arkansas: Orval Faubus (Democratic)
- Governor of California: Pat Brown (Democratic)
- Governor of Colorado: Stephen L. R. McNichols (Democratic)
- Governor of Connecticut: Abraham A. Ribicoff (Democratic)
- Governor of Delaware: J. Caleb Boggs (Republican) (until December 30), David P. Buckson (Republican) (starting December 30)
- Governor of Florida: LeRoy Collins (Democratic)
- Governor of Georgia: Ernest Vandiver (Democratic)
- Governor of Hawaii: William F. Quinn (Republican)
- Governor of Idaho: Robert E. Smylie (Republican)
- Governor of Illinois: William G. Stratton (Republican)
- Governor of Indiana: Harold W. Handley (Republican)
- Governor of Iowa: Herschel C. Loveless (Democratic)
- Governor of Kansas: George Docking (Democratic)
- Governor of Kentucky: Bert T. Combs (Democratic)
- Governor of Louisiana: Earl K. Long (Democratic) (until May 10), Jimmie H. Davis (Democratic) (starting May 10)
- Governor of Maine: John H. Reed (Republican)
- Governor of Maryland: J. Millard Tawes (Democratic)
- Governor of Massachusetts: Foster Furcolo (Democratic)
- Governor of Michigan: G. Mennen Williams (Democratic)
- Governor of Minnesota: Orville L. Freeman (Democratic)
- Governor of Mississippi: James P. Coleman (Democratic) (until January 19), Ross R. Barnett (Democratic) (starting January 19)
- Governor of Missouri: James T. Blair Jr. (Democratic)
- Governor of Montana: J. Hugo Aronson (Republican)
- Governor of Nebraska: Ralph G. Brooks (Democratic) (until September 9), Dwight Burney (Republican) (starting September 9)
- Governor of Nevada: Grant Sawyer (Democratic)
- Governor of New Hampshire: Wesley Powell (Republican)
- Governor of New Jersey: Robert B. Meyner (Democratic)
- Governor of New Mexico: John Burroughs (Democratic)
- Governor of New York: Nelson Rockefeller (Republican)
- Governor of North Carolina: Luther H. Hodges (Democratic)
- Governor of North Dakota: John E. Davis (Republican)
- Governor of Ohio: Michael DiSalle (Democratic)
- Governor of Oklahoma: J. Howard Edmondson (Democratic)
- Governor of Oregon: Mark Hatfield (Republican)
- Governor of Pennsylvania: David L. Lawrence (Democratic)
- Governor of Rhode Island: Christopher Del Sesto (Republican)
- Governor of South Carolina: Ernest Hollings (Democratic)
- Governor of South Dakota: Ralph Herseth (Democratic)
- Governor of Tennessee: Buford Ellington (Democratic)
- Governor of Texas: Price Daniel (Democratic)
- Governor of Utah: George Dewey Clyde (Republican)
- Governor of Vermont: Robert T. Stafford (Republican)
- Governor of Virginia: J. Lindsay Almond (Democratic)
- Governor of Washington: Albert D. Rosellini (Democratic)
- Governor of West Virginia: Cecil H. Underwood (Republican)
- Governor of Wisconsin: Gaylord A. Nelson (Democratic)
- Governor of Wyoming: John J. Hickey (Democratic)

=== Lieutenant governors ===
- Lieutenant Governor of Alabama: Albert B. Boutwell (Democratic)
- Lieutenant Governor of Alaska: Hugh Wade (Democratic)
- Lieutenant Governor of Arkansas: Nathan Green Gordon (Democratic)
- Lieutenant Governor of California: Glenn Malcolm Anderson (Democratic)
- Lieutenant Governor of Colorado: Robert Lee Knous (Democratic)
- Lieutenant Governor of Connecticut: John N. Dempsey (Democratic)
- Lieutenant Governor of Delaware: David P. Buckson (Republican) (until December 30), vacant (starting December 30)
- Lieutenant Governor of Georgia: Garland T. Byrd (Democratic)
- Lieutenant Governor of Hawaii: James Kealoha (Republican)
- Lieutenant Governor of Idaho: William Drevlow (Democratic)
- Lieutenant Governor of Illinois: John William Chapman (Republican)
- Lieutenant Governor of Indiana: Crawford F. Parker (Republican)
- Lieutenant Governor of Iowa: Edward J. McManus (Democratic)
- Lieutenant Governor of Kansas: Joseph W. Henkle Sr. (Democratic)
- Lieutenant Governor of Kentucky: Wilson W. Wyatt (Democratic)
- Lieutenant Governor of Louisiana: Lether Frazar (Democratic) (until May 10), C. C. Aycock (Democratic) (starting May 10)
- Lieutenant Governor of Massachusetts: Robert F. Murphy (Democratic) (until October 6), vacant (starting October 6)
- Lieutenant Governor of Michigan: John B. Swainson (Democratic)
- Lieutenant Governor of Minnesota: Karl Rolvaag (Democratic)
- Lieutenant Governor of Mississippi: Paul B. Johnson Jr. (Democratic)
- Lieutenant Governor of Missouri: Edward V. Long (Democratic) (until September 23), vacant (starting September 23)
- Lieutenant Governor of Montana: Paul Cannon (Democratic)
- Lieutenant Governor of Nebraska: Dwight Burney (Republican)
- Lieutenant Governor of Nevada: Rex Bell (Republican)
- Lieutenant Governor of New Mexico: Ed V. Mead (Democratic)
- Lieutenant Governor of New York: Malcolm Wilson (Republican)
- Lieutenant Governor of North Carolina: Luther E. Barnhardt (Democratic)
- Lieutenant Governor of North Dakota: Clarence P. Dahl (Republican)
- Lieutenant Governor of Ohio: John W. Donahey (Democratic)
- Lieutenant Governor of Oklahoma: George Nigh (Democratic)
- Lieutenant Governor of Pennsylvania: John Morgan Davis (Democratic)
- Lieutenant Governor of Rhode Island: John A. Notte Jr. (Democratic)
- Lieutenant Governor of South Carolina: Burnet R. Maybank Jr. (Democratic)
- Lieutenant Governor of South Dakota: John F. Lindley (Democratic)
- Lieutenant Governor of Tennessee: William D. Baird (Democratic)
- Lieutenant Governor of Texas: Ben Ramsey (Democratic)
- Lieutenant Governor of Vermont: Robert S. Babcock (Republican)
- Lieutenant Governor of Virginia: Allie Edward Stokes Stephens (Democratic)
- Lieutenant Governor of Washington: John Cherberg (Democratic)
- Lieutenant Governor of Wisconsin: Philleo Nash (Democratic)

== Events ==
=== January ===
- January 2 – U.S. Senator John F. Kennedy (D-MA) announces his candidacy for the Democratic presidential nomination.
- January 19 – The Treaty of Mutual Cooperation and Security between the United States and Japan is signed in Washington, D.C.
- January 23 – Jacques Piccard and Don Walsh descend into the Mariana Trench in the bathyscaphe Trieste, reaching the depth of 10,916 meters.
- January 25 – In Washington, D.C., the National Association of Broadcasters reacts to the payola scandal by threatening fines for any disc jockeys accepting money for playing particular records.

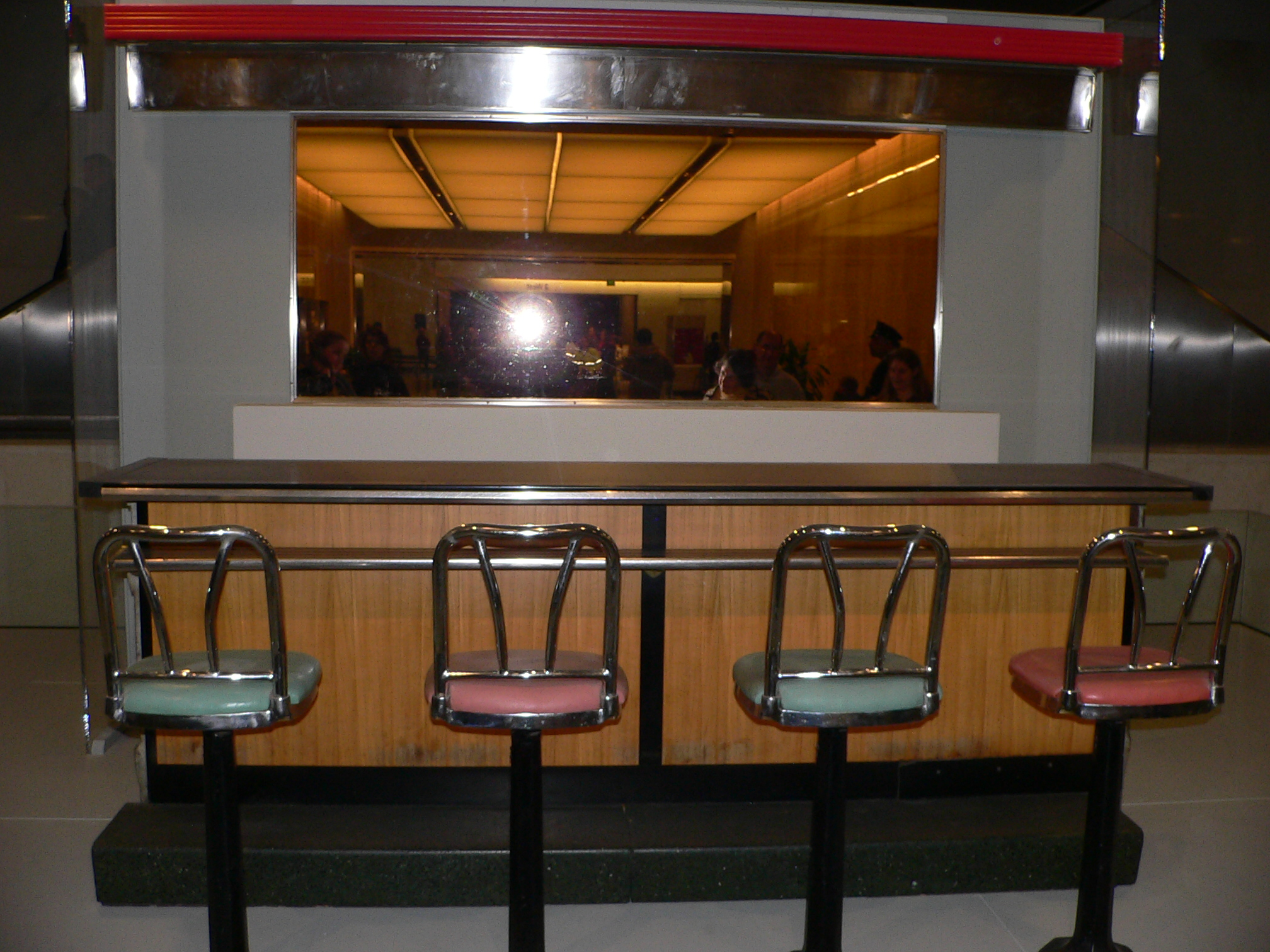
A section of lunch counter from the Greensboro, North Carolina Woolworth's where the Greensboro sit-ins began on February 1 preserved in the Smithsonian Institution National Museum of American History

- January 28 – The National Football League announces expansion teams for Dallas to start in the 1960 NFL season, and Minneapolis–St. Paul for the 1961 NFL season.

=== February ===
- February 1 – Greensboro sit-ins: In Greensboro, North Carolina, four black students from North Carolina Agricultural and Technical State University begin a sit-in at a segregated Woolworth's lunch counter. Although they are refused service, they are allowed to stay at the counter. The event triggers many similar nonviolent protests throughout the Southern United States, and six months later, the original four protesters are served lunch at the same counter.
- February 9
  - Adolph Coors III, the chairman of the board of the Coors Brewing Company, is kidnapped in the United States, and his captors demand a ransom of $500,000. Coors is later found murdered, and Joseph Corbett Jr. is indicted for the crime.
  - Joanne Woodward receives the first star on the Hollywood Walk of Fame.
- February 11 – The airship ZPG-3W is destroyed in a storm in Massachusetts.
- February 13 – Nashville sit-ins begin.
- February 18 – The 1960 Winter Olympics open in Squaw Valley, Placer County, California.
- February 29 – The first Playboy Club opens in Chicago.

=== March ===
- March 3 – Elvis Presley returns home from Germany to the United States, after being away on military duty for 2 years.
- March 5 – Elvis Presley receives his honorable discharge from the U.S. Army.
- March 6 – Vietnam War: The United States announces that 3,500 American soldiers will be sent to Vietnam.
- March 17 – Northwest Airlines Flight 710 crashes near Tell City, Indiana, killing all 61 on board.
- March 22 – Arthur Leonard Schawlow and Charles Hard Townes receive the first patent for a laser.
- March 28 – Director Stanley Kramer receives the first star on the Hollywood Walk of Fame.

=== April ===
- April 4
  - The 32nd Academy Awards ceremony, hosted by Bob Hope, is held at RKO Pantages Theatre in Hollywood. William Wyler's Ben-Hur wins eleven awards (breaking the record set by Gigi the previous year), including Best Motion Picture and Wyler's third Best Director win (his first since 1946). The film also receives the most nominations with 12.
  - Elvis Presley's song "Are You Lonesome Tonight?" is recorded for the first time.
- April 13 – The United States launches navigation satellite Transit I-b.
- April 17 – Russwood Park, a baseball stadium in Memphis, Tennessee, burns to the ground shortly after a Chicago White Sox versus Cleveland Indians game.

=== May ===
- May 1 – A Soviet missile shoots down an American Lockheed U-2 spy plane; the pilot Gary Powers is captured.
- May 3 – The Fantasticks, the world's longest-running musical, opens at New York City's Sullivan Street Playhouse, where it will play for 42 years.
- May 4 – A. J. Liebling promulgates Liebling's Law in The New Yorker Magazine: "Freedom of the press is guaranteed only to those who own one."
- May 6 – President Dwight Eisenhower signs the Civil Rights Act of 1960 into law.
- May 9 – The U.S. Food and Drug Administration announces that it will approve birth control as an additional indication for Searle's Enovid, making it the world's first approved oral contraceptive pill.
- May 10 – The nuclear submarine USS Triton, under the command of Captain Edward L. Beach Jr., completes the first underwater circumnavigation of the Earth.
- May 16
  - Theodore Maiman operates the first laser.
  - Nikita Khrushchev demands an apology from U.S. President Dwight D. Eisenhower for U-2 spy plane flights over the Soviet Union, thus ending the 1960 Paris summit.
- May 20 – In Japan, police carry away Socialist members of the Diet who are protesting the Treaty of Mutual Cooperation and Security between the United States and Japan; the Japanese House of Representatives then approves the treaty.

=== June ===
- June 7 – U.S. Senator John F. Kennedy wins the California Democratic primary.
- June 16 – Psychological horror film Psycho is released, directed by Alfred Hitchcock.
- June 22 – The United States Naval Research Laboratory SOLRAD 1 Galactic Radiation and Background program satellite is successfully launched by a Thor-Ablestar rocket (along with navigation satellite Transit 2A), serving as the first successful U.S. reconnaissance satellite over the Soviet Union and returning the first real-time X-ray and ultraviolet observations of the Sun.
- June 23 – Little Missouri National Grassland is established.
- June 29 – Bhumibol Adulyadej becomes the first Thai monarch to address the United States Congress.

=== July ===
July 4: The 50-star U.S. flag is adopted

- July 1 – A Soviet MiG fighter north of Murmansk in the Barents Sea shoots down a 6-man RB-47. Two United States Air Force officers survive and are imprisoned in Moscow's dreaded Lubyanka prison.
- July 4 – Following the admission of Hawaii as the 50th U.S. state the previous year, the 50-star flag of the United States debuts in Philadelphia, Pennsylvania.
- July 11 – Harper Lee releases her critically acclaimed novel To Kill a Mockingbird.
- July 13 – U.S. Senator John F. Kennedy is nominated for president at the Democratic National Convention in Los Angeles, California.
- July 21 – Francis Chichester, English navigator and yachtsman, arrives in New York aboard Gypsy Moth II, having made a record solo Atlantic crossing in 40 days.
- July 25 – The Woolworth's counter in Greensboro, North Carolina, the subject of a sit-in that sparked sit-ins and pickets across the southern United States in February 1960, serves its first black customer.
- July 25–28 – In Chicago, the Republican National Convention nominates U.S. Vice President Richard M. Nixon for president and Henry Cabot Lodge Jr. for vice president.

=== August ===
- August 6 – Cuban Revolution: In response to a United States embargo against Cuba, Fidel Castro nationalizes American and foreign-owned property in the nation.
- August 16 – Joseph Kittinger parachutes from a balloon over New Mexico at 102,800 feet (31,300 m). He sets world records for: high-altitude jump; free-fall by falling 16 miles (26 km) before opening his parachute; and fastest speed by a human without motorized assistance, 982 km/h (614 mi/h). These records would stand unbeaten for over 60 years.
- August 17 – The trial of U-2 pilot Francis Gary Powers begins in Moscow.
- August 18 – United States president Dwight Eisenhower is briefed on the Congo crisis at a meeting with the U.S. National Security Council, and asks whether the U.S. "can't get rid of this guy" (Patrice Lumumba).
- August 19 – Cold War: In Moscow, downed American U-2 pilot Francis Gary Powers is sentenced to 10 years imprisonment by the Soviet Union for espionage.
- August 25 – The USS Seadragon surfaces at the North Pole, where the crew plays softball.
- August 29 – Hurricane Donna kills 50 in Florida and New England.

=== September ===
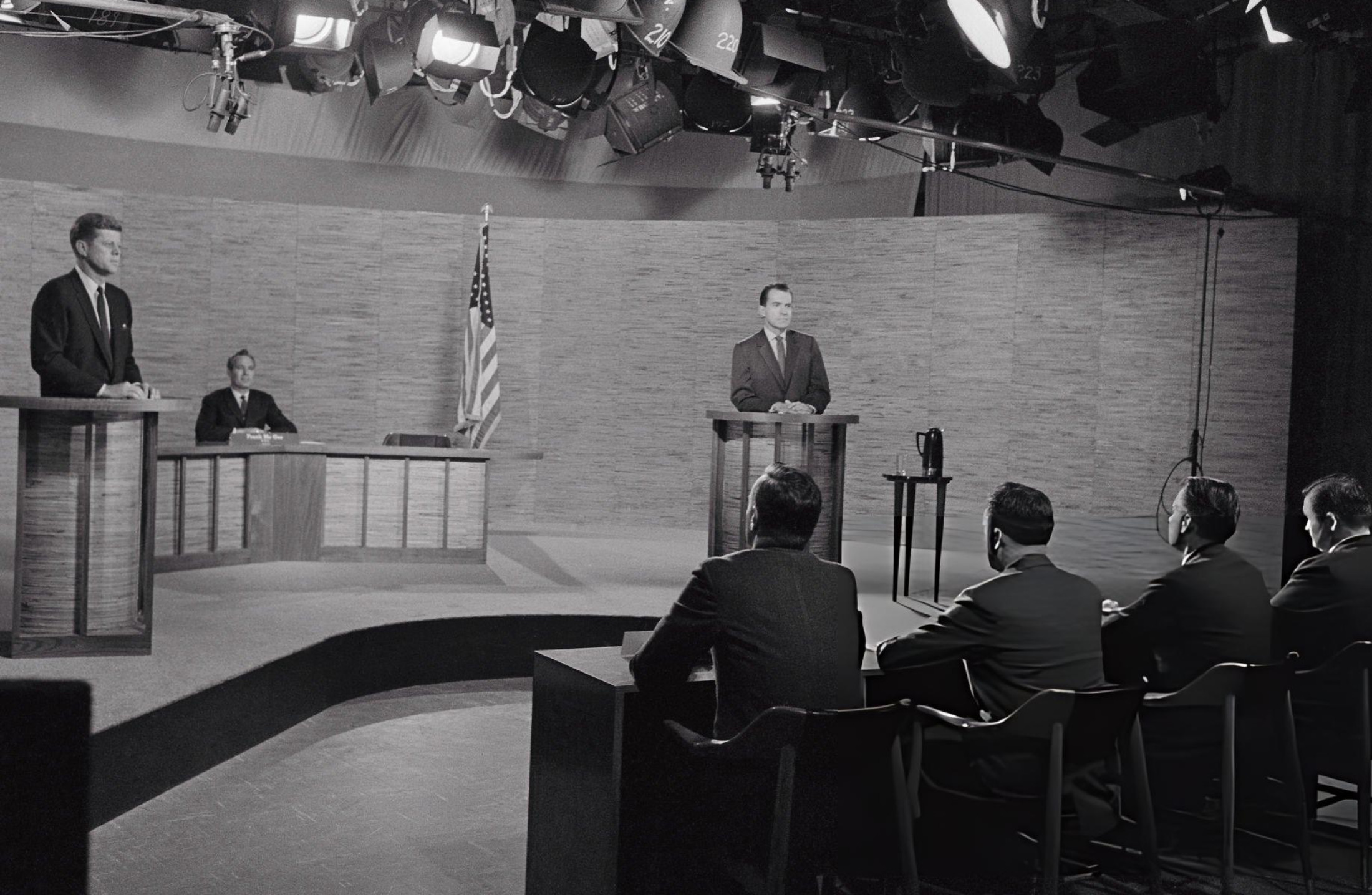
September 26: The first televised U.S. presidential election debate

- September 1 – Disgruntled railroad workers effectively halt operations of the Pennsylvania Railroad, marking the first shutdown in the company's history (the event lasts two days).
- September 5 – 1960 Summer Olympics: Cassius Clay wins the gold medal in boxing.
- September 8 – In Huntsville, Alabama, U.S. President Dwight D. Eisenhower formally dedicates the Marshall Space Flight Center (activated by NASA on July 1).
- September 26 – The two leading U.S. presidential candidates, Richard Nixon and John F. Kennedy, participate in the first televised presidential election debate.
- September 30 – Animated sitcom The Flintstones airs its first episode on the ABC network in the United States, becoming Hanna-Barbera's first television series episode lasting half an hour.

=== October ===
- October 7 – Frank McGee hosts the second presidential debate.
- October 12 – John F. Kennedy speaks before the Ministerial Association of Houston, Texas, saying, in part, "I believe in an America where the separation of church and state is absolute; where no Catholic prelate would tell the American President, should he be Catholic, how to act; and where no Protestant minister would tell his parishioners for whom to vote."
- October 13
  - The third John F. Kennedy – Richard M. Nixon presidential debate takes place.
  - The Pittsburgh Pirates defeat the New York Yankees in the seventh game of the World Series in baseball on Bill Mazeroski's walk-off home run.
- October 14 – U.S. presidential candidate John F. Kennedy first suggests the idea for the Peace Corps.
- October 21 – Quincy Howe hosts the final debate of the 1960 election.
- October 26 – Robert F. Kennedy calls Coretta Scott King, wife of Martin Luther King Jr., and secures her husband's release from jail on a traffic violation in Atlanta, Georgia.
- October 29
  - In Louisville, Kentucky, Cassius Clay (later Muhammad Ali) wins his first professional fight.
  - California Polytechnic State University football team plane crash: A Curtiss C-46 carrying the Cal Poly Mustangs football team crashes during takeoff from Toledo Express Airport in Ohio, resulting in 22 deaths.

=== November ===
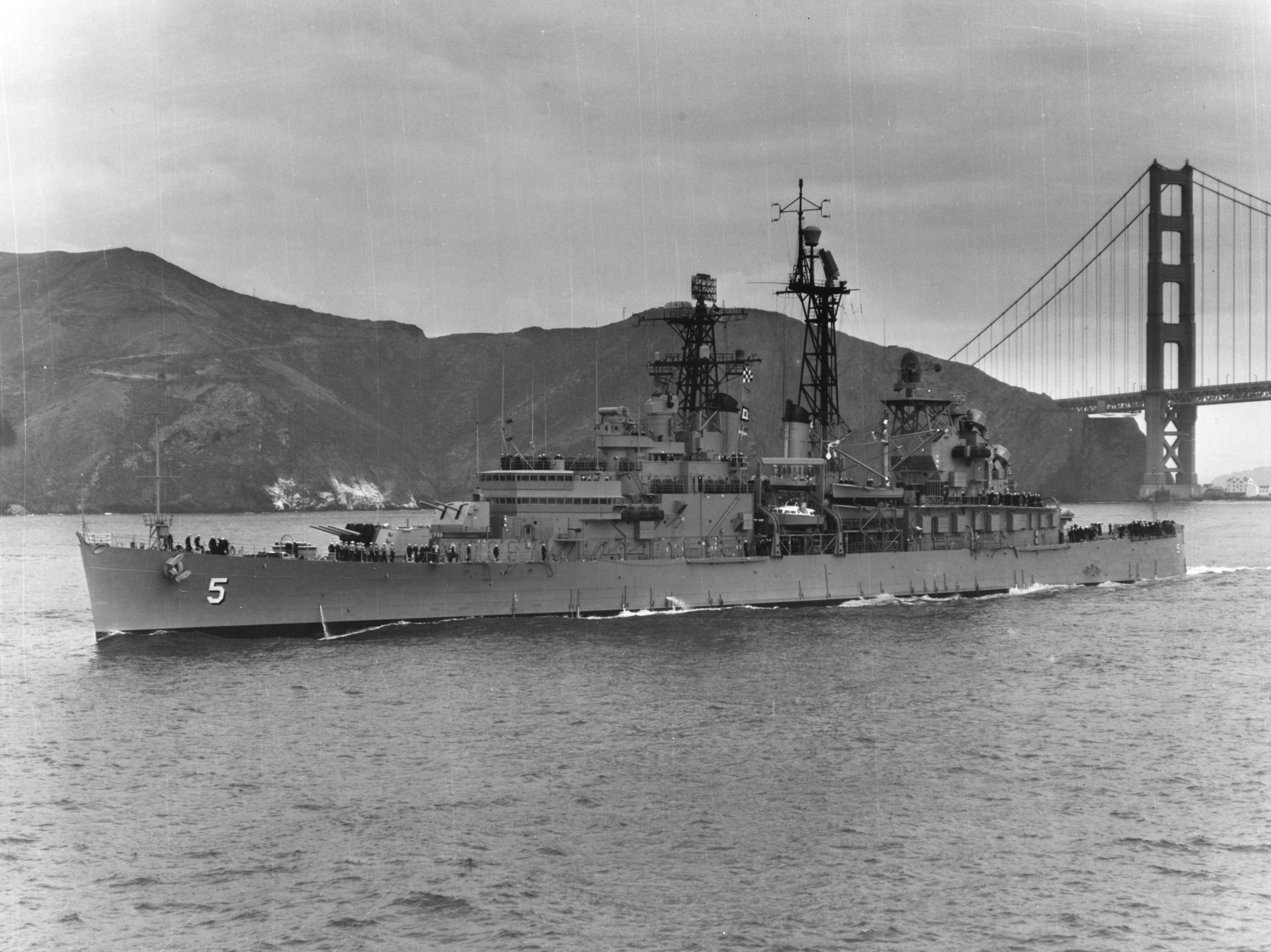
USS Oklahoma City (CLG-5) steams under Golden Gate Bridge, 16 November 1960.

- November 8 – 1960 United States presidential election: In a close race, Democratic U. S. Senator John F. Kennedy is elected over Republican U.S. Vice President Richard M. Nixon, becoming (at 43) the youngest man elected president.
- November 13 – Sammy Davis Jr. marries Swedish actress May Britt.
- November 14 – New Orleans school desegregation crisis: Ruby Bridges and the McDonogh Three become the first black children to attend an all-white elementary school in Louisiana.
- November 15 – The Polaris missile is test-launched.
- November 24 – Basketball player Wilt Chamberlain grabs 55 rebounds in a single game, the all-time record in the NBA.

=== December ===
- December 2 – U.S. President Dwight D. Eisenhower authorizes the use of $1 million for the relief and resettlement of Cuban refugees, who have been arriving in Florida at the rate of 1,000 a week.
- December 5 – Boynton v. Virginia: The U.S. Supreme Court declares segregation in public transit to be illegal.
- December 9 – The first Domino's Pizza location opens in Ypsilanti, Michigan.
- December 11 – MGM's The Wizard of Oz is rerun on CBS only a year after its previous telecast, thus beginning the tradition of annual telecasts of the film in the United States.
- December 12 – The U.S. Supreme Court upholds a Federal Court ruling that Louisiana's segregation laws are unconstitutional.
- December 13 – Navy Commander Leroy Heath (Pilot) and Lieutenant Larry Monroe (Bombardier/Navigator) establish a world altitude record of 91,450.8 feet (27,874.2 metres) in an A3J Vigilante carrying a 1,000-kilogram payload, besting the previous record by over 4 miles.
- December 16
  - U.S. Secretary of State Christian Herter announces that the United States will commit five atomic submarines and eighty Polaris missiles to NATO by the end of 1963.
  - 1960 New York air disaster: United Airlines DC-8 collides with a TWA Lockheed Constellation over Staten Island, New York City. All 128 passengers and crew on both planes are killed, as are 6 persons on the ground.
- December 19 – Fire sweeps through the USS Constellation, the largest U.S. aircraft carrier, while it is under construction at a Brooklyn Navy Yard pier, killing 50 and injuring 150.
- December 20 – Discoverer 19 is launched into polar orbit from Vandenberg Air Force Base, to measure radiation.

=== Ongoing ===
- Cold War (1947–1991)
- Space Race (1957–1975)

== Births ==
- January 1 – Michael Seibert, ice dancer and choreographer
- January 4
  - Art Paul Schlosser, singer-songwriter
  - Michael Stipe, rock singer (R.E.M.)
- January 6 – Howie Long, American football player
  - April Winchell, writer and voice actress
- January 12 – Dominique Wilkins, French-born basketball player
- January 19
  - Scott Thunes, bass player
  - Will Wright, video game designer, co-founded Maxis
- January 21 – Toxey Haas, businessman, founder of Haas Outdoors, Inc.
- January 29
  - Gia Carangi, model (d. 1986)
  - Greg Louganis, diver
  - Steve Sax, baseball player and sportscaster
- February 3
  - Tim Chandler, bass player (d. 2018)
  - Marty Jannetty, wrestler and trainer
  - Kerry Von Erich, wrestler (d. 1993)
- February 7
  - Robert Smigel, actor, comedian and puppeteer
  - James Spader, actor and producer
- February 13 – Gary Patterson, American football coach
- February 14 – Jim Kelly, American football player
- February 18 – Tony Anselmo, animator and voice actor
- February 19 – John Paul Jr., racing driver (d. 2020)
- February 20 – Wendee Lee, voice actress
- February 21 – Henry G. Brinton, writer and minister
- February 22 – Charles Cullen, serial killer
- February 27 – Kara Kennedy, television producer, daughter of Ted Kennedy (d. 2011)
- February 29 – Tony Robbins, motivational speaker and author
- March 2 – Debra Marshall, wrestling valet
- March 7 – Joe Carter, baseball player
- March 8
  - Finn Carter, actress
  - Jeffrey Eugenides, author
- March 9
  - Finn Carter, actress and photographer
  - Ann Hornaday, film critic (d. 2026)
- March 13 – Joe Ranft, screenwriter, animator, storyboard artist and voice actor (d. 2005)
- March 14 – Kirby Puckett, baseball player (d. 2006)
- March 20 – Norm Magnusson, artist
- March 21 – Robert Sweet, rock drummer (Stryper)
- March 26
  - Marcus Allen, American football player
  - Jennifer Grey, actress
  - Jon Huntsman Jr., businessman, diplomat, and politician
- April 8 – John Schneider, actor (The Dukes of Hazzard)
- April 12 – David Thirdkill, basketball player
- April 13 – Bob Casey Jr., U.S. Senator from Pennsylvania from 2007 to 2025
- April 15 – Eddie Garcia, American football player (d. 2025)
- April 18
  - Jim Margraff, American football coach (d. 2019)
  - J. Christopher Stevens, diplomat, U.S. Ambassador to Libya (d. 2012 in Libya)
- April 19 – Frank Viola, baseball player
- April 20
  - John Altenburgh, blues and jazz musician
  - Rodney Holman, American football player and coach
- April 21 – Nate Thayer, journalist (d. 2023)
- April 23 – Valerie Bertinelli, actress and TV presenter
- April 28
  - John Cerutti, baseball player (d. 2004)
  - Elena Kagan, Associate Justice of the Supreme Court of the U.S. from 2010
- April 30
  - Kerry Healey, college professor and politician
- May 3 – Jaron Lanier, computer scientist
- May 6 – John Flansburgh, rock musician (They Might Be Giants)
- May 7 – Adam Bernstein, music video/television director
- May 8 – Eric Brittingham, rock bassist
- May 9 – Tony Gwynn, baseball player (d. 2014)
- May 10 – Dean Heller, U.S. Senator from Nevada since 2011 to 2019
- May 14 – Steve Williams, professional wrestler (d. 2009)
- May 20
  - John Billingsley, actor
  - Tony Goldwyn, actor, voice actor, and film director
- May 21
  - Jeffrey Dahmer, serial killer (d. 1994)
  - Kent Hrbek, baseball player
  - John O'Brien, novelist (d. 1994)
  - Jeffrey Toobin, lawyer and essayist
- May 25 – Amy Klobuchar, U.S. Senator from Minnesota since 2007
- June 1 – Lucy McBath, politician
- June 3 – Don Brown, novelist, author and attorney
- June 4 – Paul Taylor, musician (Winger)
- June 5 – Paul Montgomery, entrepreneur and inventor (d. 1999)
- June 6
  - Ervin A. Gonzalez, attorney (d. 2017)
  - Steve Vai, guitarist
- June 8
  - Gary Trousdale, animator and film director
  - Diane Meredith Belcher, concert organist, teacher, and church musician
  - Garth Smith, pianist
- June 12
  - Meredith Brooks, singer
  - Joe Kopicki, basketball player
- June 14 – Mike Laga, baseball player
- June 17 – Thomas Haden Church, film actor
- June 21 – Kevin Harlan, sports announcer
- June 22 – Erin Brockovich, environmental activist
- June 24
  - Siedah Garrett, singer-songwriter and pianist (Brand New Heavies)
  - Chris Knight, singer-songwriter
- June 26 – Zachary Breaux, jazz guitarist (d. 1997)
- June 28 – John Elway, football player
- June 30 – David Headley, terrorist
- July 1 – Guy Williams, basketball player
- July 2 – Doug LaMalfa, politician and businessman (d. 2026)
- July 4 – Barry Windham, professional wrestler
- July 5
  - Bruce Lanoil, puppeteer and voice actor
  - Jack Radcliffe, pornographic film actor
  - Pruitt Taylor Vince, actor
- July 9 – Marc Mero, amateur boxer and professional wrestler
- July 10 – Ariel Castro, criminal (d. 2013)
- July 11 – David Baerwald singer-songwriter (David & David)
- July 14
  - Kyle Gass, singer-songwriter and guitarist and actor
  - Jane Lynch, actress, comedian and author
- July 15 – Kim Alexis, model and actress
- July 16
  - Leila Kenzle, actress
  - Todd Brown, American football player
- July 18 – Anne-Marie Johnson, actress
- July 22 – Jon Oliva, vocalist and pianist (Savatage)
- August 1 – Chuck D, rapper
- August 7 – David Duchovny, actor
- August 13 – Lorna Simpson, African-American photographic and video artist
- August 17 – Sean Penn, film actor
- August 19 – Ron Darling, baseball player and sportscaster
- August 24 – Cal Ripken Jr., baseball player
- August 26
  - Jim Beard, jazz musician (d. 2024)
  - Branford Marsalis, African-American jazz musician
- September 1 – Joseph Williams, singer and film score composer
- September 14 – Melissa Leo, film actress
- September 17
  - Alan Krueger, economist and advisor to U.S. President Barack Obama (d. 2019)
  - Steve Scully, journalist
- September 19 – Yolanda Saldívar, murderer of Selena Quintanilla
- September 21 – Mary Mara, actress (d. 2022)
- September 30 – Blanche Lincoln, U.S. Senator from Arkansas from 1999 to 2011
- October 4
  - Billy Hatcher, baseball player
  - Blake Nordstrom, businessman (d. 2019)
- October 5 – Daniel Baldwin, actor
- October 13
  - Joey Belladonna, born Joseph Bellardini, thrash metal vocalist (Anthrax)
  - Tim Brewster, American football player and coach
  - Ari Fleischer, journalist and politician, 24th White House Press Secretary
  - Peter Keisler, lawyer and politician, United States Attorney General
- October 15 – Michael Lewis, author and financial journalist
- October 18 – Craig Mello, biologist
- October 19 – Kerry Sanders, news correspondent
- October 20 – Peter Fitzgerald, U.S. Senator from Illinois from 1999 to 2011
- October 21 – Paul Rugg, voice actor and producer
- October 24
  - Dennis Anderson, monster truck driver
  - BD Wong, actor
- October 28
  - Landon Curt Noll, American astronomer, cryptographer and mathematician
  - David Cote, leader of the Democrats in the New Hampshire House of Representatives
- November 1 – Tim Cook, businessman (Apple, Inc)
- November 3
  - Francis J. Beckwith, philosopher
  - Karch Kiraly, volleyball player
- November 6 – Lance Kerwin, actor (d. 2023)
- November 7 – Peter Seidler, businessman (d. 2023)
- November 11
  - Billy James, musician, music producer, writer
  - Stanley Tucci, actor and film director
- November 13 – Neil Flynn, actor
- November 14 – Tom Judson, musical theater actor
- November 15 – Keith Washington, singer
- November 19
  - Miss Elizabeth, professional wrestling manager (d. 2003)
  - Matt Sorum, hard rock drummer of Guns N' Roses, Velvet Revolver and The Cult
- November 22 – Christopher Ciccone, artist and designer (d. 2024)
- November 25
  - Amy Grant, Christian singer-songwriter and actress
  - John F. Kennedy Jr., lawyer and journalist, son of President John F. Kennedy (d. 1999)
- December 1 – Carol Alt, model and actress
- December 2
  - Deb Haaland, politician
  - Sydney Youngblood, singer
- December 3
  - Daryl Hannah, actress
  - Julianne Moore, actress
- December 4 – Fred Ramsdell, immunologist, winner of the Nobel Prize in Physiology or Medicine
- December 5
  - Brian Bromberg, jazz bassist and composer
  - Jack Russell, rock vocalist (d. 2024)
- December 9
  - Steve Doll, wrestler (d. 2009)
  - Jeff "Swampy" Marsh, television director, writer, producer, storyboard artist and actor
- December 10 – Michael Schoeffling, actor and model
- December 14 – James Comey, lawyer, director of the FBI
- December 16 – Sid Eudy, pro wrestler (d. 2024)
- December 21
  - Roger McDowell, baseball player and coach
  - Tim Rucks, American football player and coach (d. 2015)
  - Andy Van Slyke, baseball player and coach
- December 22 – Jean-Michel Basquiat, artist (d. 1988)
- December 27 – Fred Hammond, African American gospel musician
- December 30 – Heather Wilson, soldier and politician; Secretary of the Air Force
- December 31
  - John Allen Muhammad, African-American spree killer (d. 2009)
  - Harold Wayne Nichols, rapist and murderer (d. 2025)

== Deaths ==
=== January–June ===
- January 1 – Margaret Sullavan, film actress (b. 1909)
- January 4 – Dudley Nichols, screenwriter (b. 1895)
- January 10 – Arthur S. Carpender, admiral (b. 1884)
- January 12 – William Adams Delano, architect (b. 1874)
- January 16 – Rudulph Evans, sculptor (b. 1878)
- January 20 – Matt Moore, Irish-American actor (b. 1888)
- January 24
  - John Miljan, film actor (b. 1892)
  - Matt Moore, Irish-American film actor (b. 1888)
- January 25 – Diana Barrymore, stage & film actress (b. 1921)
- January 28 – Zora Neale Hurston, African-American folklorist and author (b. 1891)
- February 6 – Jesse Belvin, R&B singer (b. 1932)
- February 9 – Ernst von Dohnányi, Hungarian composer, pianist, and conductor (b. 1877 in Austria-Hungary)
- February 12 – Bobby Clark, comedian and singer (b. 1888)
- February 29
  - Melvin Purvis, law officer (b. 1903)
  - Walter Yust, encyclopedia editor (b. 1894)
- March 4 – Leonard Warren, operatic baritone (b. 1911)
- March 6 – Gene Ahern, comic-strip artist (b. 1895)
- March 11
  - Roy Chapman Andrews, explorer, adventurer and naturalist (b. 1884)
  - Takuma Kajiwara, Japanese-born photographer (b. 1876)
- March 14 – Oliver Kirk, Olympic boxer (b. 1884)
- March 19 – Bretaigne Windust, stage, film and television director (b. 1906)
- March 26 – Ian Keith, actor (b. 1899)
- April 5 – Alma Kruger, actress (b. 1868)
- April 17 – Eddie Cochran, rock singer (b. 1938)
- April 19 – Beardsley Ruml, economist (b. 1894)
- April 24 – Hope Emerson, actress (b. 1897)
- May 2 – Caryl Chessman, criminal (b. 1921)
- May 11 – John D. Rockefeller Jr., financier and philanthropist, son of John D. Rockefeller (b. 1874)
- May 22 – Claire Phillips, spy (b. 1907)
- May 27
  - Edward Brophy, actor (b. 1895)
  - James Montgomery Flagg, artist and illustrator (b. 1877)
  - George Zucco, British actor (b. 1886)
- June 4 – Lucien Littlefield, actor (b. 1895)
- June 6 – Ernest L. Blumenschein, painter, member of Taos art colony (b. 1874)
- June 20 – John B. Kelly Sr., Olympic rower (father of Grace Kelly) (b. 1889)
- June 25 – Tommy Corcoran, baseball player (b. 1869)

=== July–December ===
- July 12 – Buddy Adler, film producer (b. 1906)
- July 15 – Lawrence Tibbett, operatic baritone (b. 1896)
- July 16 – John P. Marquand, novelist (b. 1893)
- July 26 – Cedric Gibbons, Irish-American art director (b. 1893)
- August 7 – Walden L. Ainsworth, admiral (b. 1886)
- August 9 – Richard Cramer, actor (b. 1889)
- August 10 – Frank Lloyd, film director (b. 1886)
- August 14 – Fred Clarke, baseball player (Pittsburgh Pirates), member of MLB Hall of Fame (b. 1872)
- August 23 – Oscar Hammerstein II, librettist (b. 1895)
- August 27 – Stanley Clifford Weyman, impostor (b. 1890)
- September 1
  - Aunt Molly Jackson, folk singer and union activist (b. 1880)
  - Ángel Ramos, Puerto Rican businessman (b. 1902 in Puerto Rico)
- September 3 – Joseph Lamb, composer (b. 1887)
- September 8 – Oscar Pettiford, African-American jazz bassist and composer (b. 1922)
- September 11 – Edwin Justus Mayer, screenwriter (b. 1896)
- September 20 – David Park, painter (b. 1911)
- September 23 – Kathlyn Williams, actress (b. 1879)
- September 25 – Emily Post, author, novelist, and socialite (b. 1872)
- October 11 – Richard Cromwell, actor (b. 1910)
- October 15 – Clara Kimball Young, actress (b. 1890)
- October 20 – Edward D. Crippa, politician, senator from Wyoming (b. 1899)
- October 22 – Morgan Dennis, painter and illustrator (b. 1892)
- October 31 – H. L. Davis, author (b. 1894)
- November 3
  - Bobby Wallace, baseball player (St. Louis Browns), member of MLB Hall of Fame (b. 1873)
  - Paul Willis, silent film actor (b. 1901)
- November 5
  - Donald Barnhouse, theologian, pastor, author, and radio pioneer (b. 1895)
  - Ward Bond, film actor (b. 1903)
  - Johnny Horton, country singer (b. 1925)
  - Mack Sennett, Canadian-American producer, actor, and director (b. 1880)
- November 7 – A. P. Carter, singer and songwriter (b. 1891)
- November 8 – Otto Frederick Rohwedder, engineer and inventor (b. 1880)
- November 12 – Lord Buckley, monologist (b. 1906)
- November 14 – Walter Catlett, actor (b. 1889)
- November 16 – Clark Gable, film actor (b. 1901)
- November 19 – Phyllis Haver, film actress (b. 1899)
- November 28
  - James Bert Garner, chemical engineer and inventor (b. 1870)
  - Richard Wright, African-American novelist (b. 1908)
- December 8 – Ross T. McIntire, naval surgeon (b. 1889)
- December 13 – John Charles Thomas, operatic baritone (b. 1891)
- December 26 – Giuseppe Bellanca, Italian-American aircraft designer and company founder (b. 1886)

== See also ==
- List of American films of 1960
- Timeline of United States history (1950–1969)
