= Furthering Asbestos Claim Transparency Act of 2013 =

Furthering Asbestos Claim Transparency (FACT) Act of 2013
- Long title: To amend title 11 of the United States Code to require the public disclosure by trusts established under section 524(g) of such title, of quarterly reports that contain detailed information regarding the receipt and disposition of claims for injuries based on exposure to asbestos; and for other purposes.
- Announced in: the 113th United States Congress
- Sponsored by: Rep. Blake Farenthold (R, TX-27)
- Number of co-sponsors: 1

Codification
- U.S.C. sections affected: 11 U.S.C. § 524, 11 U.S.C. § 107

Legislative history
- Introduced in the House as H.R. 982 by Rep. Blake Farenthold (R, TX-27) on March 6, 2013; Committee consideration by United States House Committee on the Judiciary, United States House Judiciary Subcommittee on Regulatory Reform, Commercial and Antitrust Law

The Furthering Asbestos Claim Transparency (FACT) Act of 2013 (H.R. 982) is a bill that would require asbestos trusts in the United States to file quarterly reports about the payouts they make and who receives them. The goal of this requirement is to prevent fraud by ensuring claimants don't file for the same injury with more than one of the asbestos trusts. There are approximately 60 trusts with billions of dollars in them. This bill was introduced into the United States House of Representatives during the 113th United States Congress.

== Background ==
Asbestos is a set of six naturally occurring silicate minerals used commercially for their desirable physical properties. They all have in common their eponymous asbestiform habit: long (roughly 1:20 aspect ratio), thin fibrous crystals. The prolonged inhalation of asbestos fibers can cause serious illnesses including malignant lung cancer, mesothelioma, and asbestosis (a type of pneumoconiosis). The trade and use of asbestos have been restricted or banned in many jurisdictions. Asbestos became increasingly popular among manufacturers and builders in the late 19th century because of its sound absorption, average tensile strength, its resistance to fire, heat, electrical and chemical damage, and affordability. It was used in such applications as electrical insulation for hotplate wiring and in building insulation.

As of March 2013, there were 85 new personal injury claims related to asbestos a day. There have been hundreds of thousands of asbestos injury claims over the past three decades which has led to bankruptcy for some companies.

== Provisions of the bill ==
This summary is based largely on the summary provided by the Congressional Research Service, a public domain source.

The Furthering Asbestos Claim Transparency (FACT) Act of 2013 would amend federal bankruptcy law concerning a trust formed under a reorganization plan following the discharge in bankruptcy of a debtor corporation in order to assume the debtor's liability with respect to claims seeking recovery for personal injury, wrongful death, or property damage allegedly caused by the presence of, or exposure to, asbestos or asbestos-containing products.

The bill would require such a trust to file with the bankruptcy court quarterly reports, available on the public docket, which describe each demand the trust has received from a claimant and the basis for any payment made to that claimant (excluding any confidential medical record or the claimant's full Social Security number).

It would also require such reports, upon written request, and subject to payment (demanded at the option of the trust) for any reasonable cost incurred by it, to provide any information related to payment from, and demands for payment from, the trust to any party to any action in law or equity concerning liability for asbestos exposure.

== Congressional Budget Office report ==
This summary is based largely on the summary provided by the Congressional Budget Office, as ordered reported by the House Committee on the Judiciary on May 21, 2013. This is a public domain source.

H.R. 982 would require trusts set up through a Chapter 11 bankruptcy reorganization caused by asbestos liabilities to submit quarterly reports to the bankruptcy court concerning the damage claims and payments made by the trust. Based on information provided by the Administrative Office of the U.S. Courts (AOUSC), CBO estimates that implementing H.R. 982 would have no significant impact on the federal budget because the AOUSC would incur only minor costs to make that information publicly available. Enacting H.R. 982 would not affect direct spending or revenues; therefore, pay-as-you-go procedures do not apply.

H.R. 982 contains no intergovernmental mandates as defined in the Unfunded Mandates Reform Act (UMRA) and would impose no costs on state, local, or tribal governments.

H.R. 982 would impose a private-sector mandate as defined in UMRA by requiring asbestos trusts to submit quarterly reports. According to studies by the Government Accountability Office (GAO) and the RAND Corporation, only a small number of asbestos trusts currently exist. Further, the GAO study indicates that the information to be submitted under the bill is already tracked by many of the asbestos trusts. Therefore, CBO expects that the incremental cost to comply with the reporting requirements in the bill would fall below the annual threshold established in UMRA for private-sector mandates ($150 million in 2013, adjusted annually for inflation).

== Procedural history ==
The Furthering Asbestos Claim Transparency (FACT) Act of 2013 was introduced in the United States House of Representatives by Rep. Blake Farenthold (R, TX-27) on March 6, 2013. It was referred to the United States House Committee on the Judiciary and the United States House Judiciary Subcommittee on Regulatory Reform, Commercial and Antitrust Law. On March 13, 2013, the Subcommittee had a hearing on the bill, reported as Hearing Report 113-39. It was reported (amended) by the House Judiciary Committee on October 30, 2013, alongside House Report 113-254. On November 8, 2013, House Majority Leader Eric Cantor announced that the bill would be considered during the week of November 11, 2013.

== Debate and discussion ==
Proponents of the bill argued that it will prevent claimants from "double dipping" by claiming their injury twice. They argue that this helps future victims by ensuring that there is still money in the future and that it has not been given out to false or double claims. The U.S. Chamber of Commerce's Institute for Legal Reform is in favor of the bill. It ran full-page advertisements in favor of the bill in Washington, D.C. area newspapers such as Politico and The Hill. The United States Chamber of Commerce wrote a letter to the House of Representatives urging them to vote in favor of the bill, expressing concern about existing fraud and abuse of the trust funds.

Opponents argue that reports would hurt the privacy of the victims and make claims more difficult. The Asbestos Disease Awareness Organization opposed this bill. The widow of Rep. Bruce Vento, who died of asbestos related cancer, lobbied Congress against the legislation. She argued that the bill "forced asbestos victims and their families to release private information that will put them at risk for identity theft." The Asbestos Cancer Victim Rights Campaign was also against the bill.

== See also ==
- List of bills in the 113th United States Congress
- Bankruptcy in the United States
- Asbestos and the law
