= Russell Budd =

American lawyer

Russell W. Budd is an American trial lawyer best known for representing plaintiffs claiming toxic and chemical exposure such as asbestos. He is president and managing shareholder of the law firm Baron & Budd, P.C. Budd has also been an active figure in politics as a fundraiser for the Democratic Party.

== Background and education ==
Budd earned a B.A. from Trinity University graduating cum laude in 1976 and a J.D. from the University of Texas in 1979.

== Legal career ==
Budd is president and managing shareholder of Baron & Budd, P.C., one of the largest plaintiff's law firms in the nation, headquartered in Dallas, Texas.

A shareholder of Baron & Budd since 1985 and president and managing shareholder since 2002, Budd expanded the firm from its cornerstone asbestos practice to a national firm tackling the biggest defendants in areas as diverse as mesothelioma (a cancer caused by exposure to asbestos), water contamination, qui tam, California Proposition 65 violations, pharmaceutical and medical-device injuries, Chinese drywall, financial fraud and online scams.

From the mid 1980s into the 1990s, Budd represented a group of Costa Rican farmers in a lawsuit alleging that pesticides used in the banana crops with which they worked had caused an epidemic of sterility among their ranks; Budd fought to enable the plaintiffs to sue in the courts of the United States, where the companies that produced the pesticides were located. Budd sought to try the case in Florida, Texas, and California, ultimately winning a Texas Supreme Court ruling in 1990 allowing the case to be brought in that state.

In the late 1990s, when a Halliburton subsidiary filed for bankruptcy reorganization, the firm's asbestos victims secured the services of Baron & Budd to protect their rights. The agreement reached after Russell Budd, the firm's managing shareholder, negotiated with Halliburton created the largest asbestos trust fund of its kind anywhere in the world that would protect current and future asbestos victims throughout the United States. In 2010, under Budd's direction, the firm represented individuals and businesses affected by the Deepwater Horizon oil spill.

== Philanthropic and political activities ==
Budd, along with his wife Dorothy, who is also an attorney, as well as a deacon at the Church of the Incarnation in Dallas, have engaged in a wide variety of philanthropic activity. From 2004 to 2014, they donated $3.5 million to nonprofit organizations in the Dallas area and donating an addition $2.5 million in 2014 to Southern Methodist University, to endow the Budd Center for Involving Communities in Education in SMU's School Education and Human Development. Under Budd's direction, Baron & Budd donated $3 million to the International Pleural Mesothelioma Program at Brigham and Women's Hospital to research curative therapy for mesothelioma. The Asbestos Disease Awareness Organization, Lung Cancer Alliance and other asbestos awareness advocacy organizations have also benefited from generous donations from the firm. The firm has underwritten two books for mesothelioma patients: one written and produced by Cure magazine and one by the National Comprehensive Cancer Network (NCCN).

Budd has also been a prolific donor to the Democratic Party and served as a "bundler" in Obama's presidential campaign, raising at least $50,000 for the presidential campaign by soliciting money from other donors. Budd and his wife, Dorothy, hosted the president at their home in August 2010, where Vice President Joe Biden also came to raise money in March 2010. The Budds contributed $50,000 apiece for Obama's inauguration in January 2009. In the 2010 election cycle, the Budds gave more than $146,000 to Democratic committees, PACs and congressional and gubernatorial candidates. On the evening of March 20, 2024, Russell and Dorothy Budd hosted a fundraising reception at their home for the 2024 reelection campaign of President Joe Biden and Vice President Kamala Harris. President Biden attended the reception while on a campaign fundraising swing through Texas and spoke to the group of wealthy, Democratic campaign donors in attendance.
