= Baron & Budd, P.C. =

- Headquarters: Dallas, United States
- No. of offices: 6
- Offices: 3102 Oak Lawn Avenue, #1100, Dallas, Texas, U.S.
- No. of employees: 260
- Key people: Russell Budd, president and managing shareholder
- Date founded: 1977
- Website: baronandbudd.com

Baron & Budd, P.C. is an American plaintiffs' law firm headquartered in Dallas, Texas. The firm is known for representing cities, counties, and municipalities in litigation against opioid distributors.

Opponents of mass tort litigation have criticized the firm for the zealousness with which it represents its clients, and for the political activities of some of its attorneys.

== History ==
=== Establishment and early practice ===
Baron & Budd began its practice in 1977. The firm's first major case involved a lead smelter adjacent to one of the largest public housing projects in Dallas. Baron & Budd represented more than 200 families in a lawsuit that eventually closed the smelter and provided sizable damage awards for court-supervised trusts that benefited several hundred children. For most of its existence, Baron & Budd has maintained a substantial presence in "litigation against former asbestos manufacturers and companies that used asbestos products", being one of the first law firms in the U.S. to successfully try mesothelioma cases. The firm's clients in this practice have included celebrities such as actor Paul Gleason, who died from mesothelioma in 2006.

The firm has also practiced widely in other areas of mass torts, including such matters as "Benzene exposure, Fen-Phen diet drug litigation and water contamination". In 1985, Baron & Budd filed suit on behalf of more than 1,600 Tucson-area residents against an aircraft manufacturer, the City of Tucson, and the Tucson Airport Authority over trichloroethylene (TCE) contamination of the community's groundwater. Throughout the ensuing 21-year legal battle, in which Baron & Budd ultimately prevailed, the law firm helped to define Arizona law on pollution coverage. In 2006, Baron & Budd attorneys were honored with the Trial Lawyer of the Year award by Trial Lawyers for Public Justice, "in recognition of their firms work in precedent-setting litigation involving groundwater contamination in Arizona".

Another key development for the firm occurred in 1997, when the United States Supreme Court decided Amchem Products, Inc. v. Windsor. In that case, plaintiffs represented by various attorneys, including those from Baron & Budd, objected to the fairness of a class action settlement approved by the district court on behalf of injured parties not effectively represented before the court. The record for a successful appeal was developed "[t]hanks largely to lawyers at Baron & Budd, a firm representing some of the objectors" which insured that "there were more than 30 depositions, other discovery, and an 18-day fairness hearing". This outcome was reinforced within the next few years in a case also brought to fruition by Baron & Budd, Ortiz v. Fibreboard Corp. The decisions in these cases "compel appellate courts to look skeptically at class action settlements that release defendants from claims by absent plaintiffs".

=== Developments in the 2000s and 2010s ===
In 2003, Baron & Budd represented the City of Santa Monica in a landmark MTBE contamination settlement with the major oil companies. MTBE contaminated five of Santa Monica's 11 wells, forcing the city to begin importing water in 1996 for $3 million a year. In 2006, firm founder Russell Budd "helped secure a $3.9 billion settlement with the United States Gypsum Co. on behalf of the asbestos creditors committee in one of the largest bankruptcy settlements on record". Other notable cases by Baron & Budd in this time included "a 13.5 million-dollar verdict on behalf of the family of an East Texas man who died of mesothelioma as a result of asbestos exposure in his childhood, and a 15.5 million dollar jury verdict in a Mississippi lawsuit involving dioxide emissions". In 2008, Baron & Budd played a lead role in negotiations with major oil companies that had contaminated drinking water through the use of MTBE as a gasoline additive. Baron & Budd's efforts resulted in a landmark settlement, requiring the oil companies to pay a substantial cash settlement, nearly $1.5 billion, to 153 public water providers in 17 states, as well as a number of private well owners.

In August 2010, environmental attorney and Baron & Budd shareholder Burton LeBlanc of Baton Rouge, Louisiana, and Baron & Budd were retained by the state of Louisiana to provide counsel to the state's designated trustees in connection with issues related to the Deepwater Horizon explosion and the resulting oil spill. In October 2010, Scott Summy, the head of Baron & Budd's water contamination team, was one of four attorneys nationwide chosen to serve on the Plaintiffs' Executive Committee for the Gulf Oil Spill Multi-District Litigation (MDL) and as a member of the Plaintiffs' Steering Committee (PSC). In 2011, Baron & Budd, along with co-counsel, represented the first Chinese drywall client to be remediated by the Chinese Sheetrock manufacturer Knauf.

The New York Times listed Baron & Budd as the sixth biggest source of contributions to state attorneys general campaigns from 2004 to 2014.

In September 2014, the National Law Journal identified Baron & Budd as "Elite Trial Lawyers", noting that "Baron & Budd is best known for its asbestos work but its interests run much broader than that". Baron & Budd was named to "The Plaintiffs' Hot List" of the National Law Journal from 2003 to 2006, in 2008, and again in 2011 and 2012, and attorneys from the firm have repeatedly been named to the "Best Lawyers in America" list, receiving this honor for four years in a row, from 2013 to 2017.

=== Recent developments ===
In September 2017, Baron & Budd was one of two firms hired to represent Brunswick County, North Carolina in the investigation of chemical contamination of drinking water drawn from the Cape Fear River, alleged to involve the manufacture of perfluorinated chemicals (PFCs) by Chemours, DuPont and Kuraray at a facility in Fayetteville, North Carolina.

Baron & Budd has twice represented plaintiffs against Wells Fargo regarding practices by that company. In November 2016, Baron & Budd represented homeowners whose home appraisal fees had allegedly been marked up by the bank, and negotiated a $50 million settlement after winning certification of the claim as a class action. In July 2017, the firm filed a lawsuit alleging that the bank had charged auto loan customers for unnecessary insurance, causing some customers to have their cars repossessed.

The firm is representing the cities of Louisville, Cincinnati, and Birmingham, among other counties and municipalities, in litigation against opioid distributors, in response to the crisis of opioid addiction. Their Environmental Litigation Group is representing public entities, including the cities of Spokane and Seattle, as well as the State of Washington, in litigation against Monsanto-related PCB contamination.

In 2017 Baron & Budd investigated potential lawsuits that were related to allegations that pharmaceutical distributors "deliberately failed to monitor and report suspicious orders of opioids". This failed monitoring and reporting, the firm argued, potentially played a role in the opioid epidemic. The law firm had previously won a $177 million settlement against GlaxoSmithKline for the drug Avandia, arguing that the company misrepresented the drug by saying that it reduced the number of adverse cardiac events, when in actuality it did not.

In 2025, the firm represented Shasta County in a lawsuit claiming online social media and internet search engine companies have been luring youth into using networking platforms that are harmful at their age.

In January 2026, Alaska terminated its contract with Baron & Budd related to the state's PFAS firefighting foam chemicals litigation. The termination by the state’s Attorney General’s office stemmed from concerns that the firm violated the state’s conflict-of-interest rules by failing to disclose its simultaneous representation of over 300 other clients involved in related cases.
