= Ervin A. Gonzalez =

American lawyer (1960–2017)

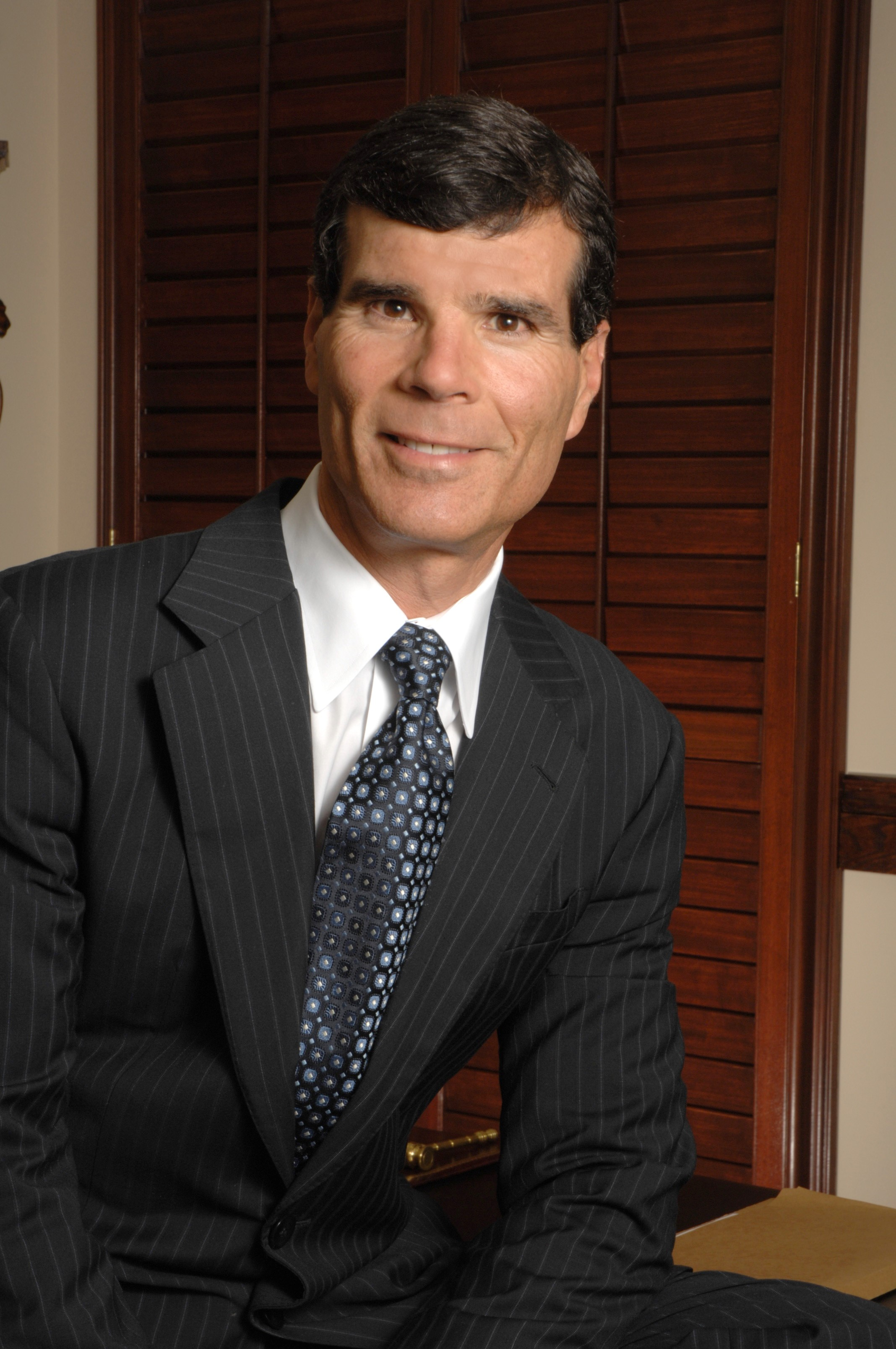
- Born: June 6, 1960; Miami, Florida, U.S.
- Died: June 8, 2017 (aged 57); Coral Gables, Florida, U.S.
- Education: St. Thomas University; University of Miami School of Law (JD)
- Occupation: Civil trial attorney
- Known for: Lead plaintiff’s counsel for various high-profile and highly publicized U.S. cases

Ervin A. Gonzalez (June 6, 1960 – June 8, 2017) was an American civil trial attorney whose practice focused on wrongful death, personal injury, medical negligence, product liability and class action torts. He was a partner with the law firm Colson Hicks Eidson in the firm's Coral Gables office.

Gonzalez served as the lead plaintiff's counsel for various high-profile and highly publicized U.S. cases involving consumer class actions, product liability, medical negligence, construction product litigation, and trucking, aviation and maritime injury. He was found dead at his home in Coral Gables on June 8, 2017.

== Education ==
Gonzalez graduated with summa cum laude honors from St. Thomas University in 1982 with a bachelor's degree in political science. He earned his Juris Doctor degree from the University of Miami School of Law in 1985 with cum laude honors.

== Legal career ==
Gonzalez achieved a $60.9 million medical malpractice award that at the time ranked as one of the largest awards ever in a Federal Tort Claims Act case.

In 2005 Gonzalez secured a $65.1 million verdict in a wrongful death case against Eller Media Company for the electrocution death of a 12-year-old boy, who the jury found was killed by shoddy electrical work performed at one of its Miami bus shelters.

Gonzalez has also settled numerous cases for settlements greater than $1 million, including a $100 million settlement in 2006 with Service Corporation International, the largest funeral home operator in the U.S., for the desecration of graves in a Jewish cemetery.

In 2010 Federal Judge Carl Barbier of the Eastern District of Louisiana selected Gonzalez from a pool of 300 qualified applicants to sit on the Plaintiff Steering Committee (PSC) in the multi-district litigation surrounding the BP Deepwater Horizon oil spill in the Gulf of Mexico. Gonzalez was one of two Florida lawyers appointed to serve on the national PSC and oversee plaintiffs’ claims stemming from the spill.

Gonzalez was also selected by Federal Judge Eldon E. Fallon of Eastern District of Louisiana to serve on the 15-member PSC for the Chinese drywall litigation. He represented hundreds of homeowners who were victims of high-sulfur Chinese drywall in new home construction. He was the lead counsel for the plaintiffs in the first jury trial in the country on the defective drywall, and the case resulted in a $2.5 million verdict for the plaintiffs. As a member of the PSC, Gonzalez assisted in securing a $1 billion settlement with Knauf Plasterboard Tianjin, a Chinese manufacturer of the drywall, and he helped to negotiate an $80 million class action settlement with insurance companies for many of the builders and installers of the drywall as well as a $55 million Florida class-action settlement with Banner Supply Company.

Gonzalez also represented U.S. Air Force veteran Robert Meltzer in 2011 in the first medical malpractice trial against a VA hospital for its improperly sanitizing medical equipment and infecting patients with bloodborne diseases. The court found that Meltzer contracted Hepatitis C at the Miami VA hospital, and he and his wife were awarded $1.25 million.

== Board certifications and licenses ==
Gonzalez was board certified in civil trial law and business litigation by The Florida Bar and the National Board of Trial Advocacy. He was licensed to practice in Florida, New York, the District of Columbia, Texas and Colorado.

== Industry and community involvement ==
Gonzalez served as an adjunct professor of litigation and trial skills at the University of Miami School of Law from 1994 until the time of his death. He served on the St. Thomas University (Florida) board of trustees, was a University of Miami Citizens board member, a past president of the Dade County Bar Association, and a past president of the Miami-Dade Trial Lawyers Association. He served on the Board of Governors of The Florida Bar from 2000 to 2010, and as a member of the Board of Trustees of the National Institute for Trial Advocacy from 2004 to 2008.

Gonzalez also wrote extensively as a regular contributing columnist on litigation and trial skills for the Miami Daily Business Review, Dade County Bar Bulletin, and the Florida Bar Journal. He also authored numerous guest columns in major media outlets, including an article on the question of judicial term limits in Florida that appeared in the op-ed page of the Miami Herald on February 16, 2016.

Gonzalez was a regular speaker and lecturer on legal and litigation matters throughout the U.S. for national and state legal industry organizations including the American Bar Association, American Justice Association, The Florida Bar, and others.

== Death ==
Gonzalez was found dead on June 8, 2017, in his Coral Gables home. The death was ruled a suicide.
