= Knauf Insulation =

Insulation product manufacturer

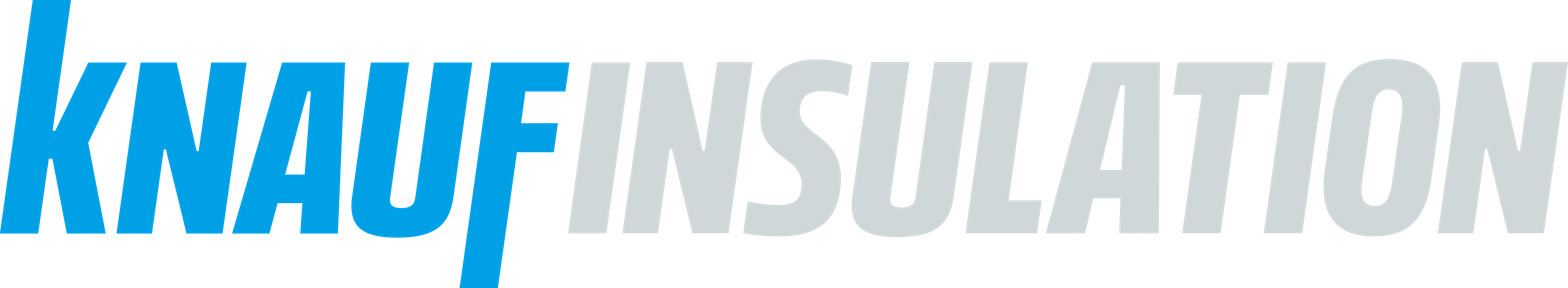
- Industry: Manufacturer of insulation products
- Founded: Shelbyville, Indiana (1978)
- Founder: Alfons and Karl Knauf
- Headquarters: Shelbyville, United States of America
- Number of locations: Knauf Insulation is present in more than 40 countries and has 27 manufacturing sites in 15 countries.
- Products: Fiberglass and mineral wool insulation
- Brands: Knauf Insulation, Guardian Insulation, Manson Insulation
- Owner: Knauf family
- Website: www.knaufnorthamerica.com

Knauf Insulation is an international company owned by the Knauf family and is an important manufacturer of insulation products in the US and Europe. The company is a producer of insulation materials such as glass wool, stone wool, wood wool boards, expanded polystyrene, extruded polystyrene, as well as the Heradesign wood wool based acoustic ceiling systems.

The company has production sites in Slovenia, the US, Mexico, Europe, Russia, and Malaysia.
