= William J. Crain =

American judge (born 1961)

Will Crain
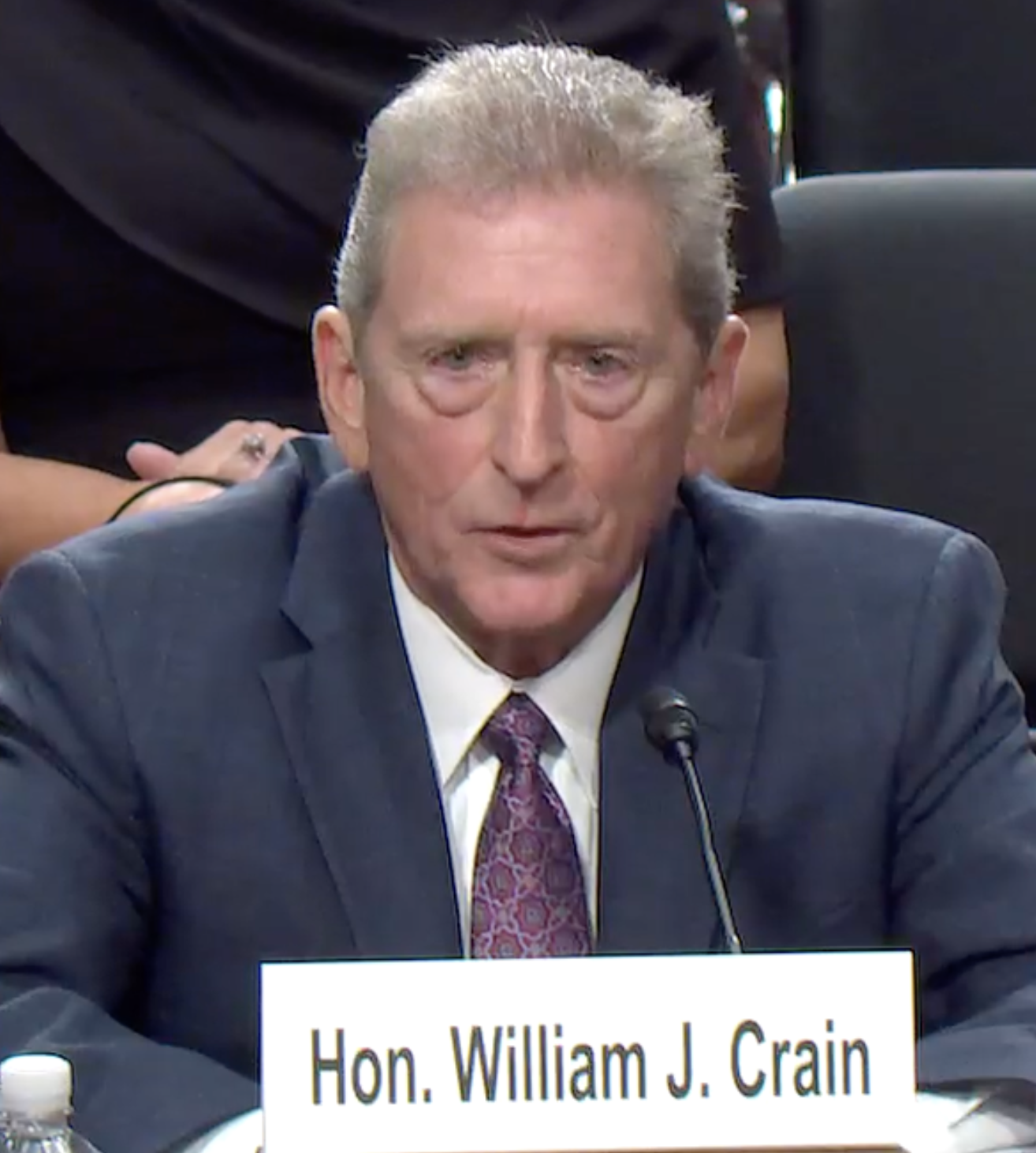

Judge of the United States District Court for the Eastern District of Louisiana
- Incumbent
- Assumed office December 19, 2025
- Appointed by: Donald Trump
- Preceded by: Eldon E. Fallon

Associate Justice of the Louisiana Supreme Court
- In office December 11, 2019 – December 19, 2025
- Preceded by: Greg G. Guidry
- Succeeded by: Allison Penzato (acting)

Personal details
- Born: William Jerrol Crain; 1961 (age 64–65) Bogalusa, Louisiana, U.S.
- Party: Republican
- Spouse: Cheri Hackett
- Children: 4
- Education: Louisiana State University (BA, JD)

William Jerrol "Will" Crain (born 1961) is an American lawyer who has served as a United States district judge of the United States District Court for the Eastern District of Louisiana since 2025. He was previously an associate justice of the Louisiana Supreme Court from 2019 to 2025.

== Education ==
Crain was born in 1961 in Bogalusa, Louisiana. He is a 1979 graduate of Bogalusa High School. He graduated with a Bachelor of Arts degree from Louisiana State University in 1983. He received his Juris Doctor from Louisiana State University Paul M. Hebert Law Center in 1986.

== Career ==
Crain served for 22 years as a partner and lawyer at the Jones Fussell Law Firm in Covington, where he litigated cases in both state and federal courts.

=== State judicial service ===
He was a judge of the Saint Tammany Parish District Court from 2009 to 2013. From 2013 to 2019, he was a judge of the Louisiana First Circuit Court of Appeal. He was sworn in as an appellate judge on December 14, 2012.

=== Louisiana Supreme Court service ===
On June 26, 2019, Crain announced his intention to run for a seat on the Louisiana Supreme Court vacated by Greg G. Guidry. Crain headed to a runoff against Hans Liljeberg on November 16, 2019. On November 16, 2019, he went on to win the election, 57% to 43%. Crain was sworn in on December 11, 2019, by his father Judge Hillary Crain.

=== Federal judicial service ===
On October 20, 2025, President Donald Trump announced his intention to nominate Crain to the United States District Court for the Eastern District of Louisiana. Crain would fill the seat vacated by Eldon E. Fallon. On October 22, 2025, the U.S. Senate Judiciary Committee held a hearing on his nomination. On November 20, 2025, the U.S. Senate Judiciary Committee reported his nomination by a 12–10 vote. On December 9, 2025, the Senate invoked cloture on his nomination by a 51–46 vote. Later that day, his nomination was confirmed by a 49–46 vote. He received his judicial commission on December 19, 2025.

== Memberships and affiliations ==
Crain is a member of the 2011 inaugural class of the Louisiana Judicial Leadership Institute.

== Personal life ==
He and his wife, Cheri Hackett Crain, have four children. He is a parishioner at St. Timothy United Methodist Church.

== Electoral history ==
Associate Justice—Supreme Court, 1st Supreme Court District (October 12, 2019)
Year	Republican	Votes	Pct	Republican	Votes	Pct	Republican	Votes	Pct	Republican	Votes	Pct
2019	Will Crain	73,534	38.61%	Richard Ducote	21,810	11.45%	Hans Liljeberg	61,859	32.48%	Scott Schlegel	33,242	17.45%

Associate Justice—Supreme Court, 1st Supreme Court District (November 11, 2019)
Year	Republican	Votes	Pct	Republican	Votes	Pct
2019	Will Crain	127,211	57.28%	Hans Liljeberg	94,875	42.72%

Legal offices
Preceded by Greg G. Guidry	Associate Justice of the Louisiana Supreme Court; 2019–2025	Succeeded by Allison Penzato; Acting
Preceded by Eldon E. Fallon	Judge of the United States District Court for the Eastern District of Louisiana; 2025–present	Incumbent
