= Asbestos bankruptcy trusts =

Trusts to pay asbestos injury claims and legal fees

Asbestos bankruptcy trusts are trusts established by firms that have filed for reorganization under Chapter 11 of the United States Bankruptcy Code to pay personal injury claims caused by exposure to asbestos. At least 56 such trusts were established from the mid-1970s to 2011.

== Background ==
As of 2017, at least 100 large companies had filed bankruptcy, at least in part, due to asbestos-related liability. Because of this, seeking compensation for asbestos victims often involves both litigation against solvent defendants and filing claims against asbestos bankruptcy trusts. The largest 26 of these trusts paid about 2.4 million claims totaling about $10.9 billion up to 2008.

== Claims ==
=== Product identification ===
Typically an asbestos plaintiff is exposed to a mixture of products during a thirty-year career in the building trades. It takes between twenty and fifty years from first exposure to the development of asbestos-caused cancer, so work histories, employment, military and social security records are used to help prove the plaintiff's exposure to various asbestos products throughout his or her career. Plaintiffs file suit or bring trust claims against all defendants whose products contributed to their disease or death. In a trial, the jury decides whether any or all defendants are liable and the value of the case. In the trust system, the bankruptcy courts use actuarial models to determine the trust's share of responsibility based on disease and occupation. Trusts pay only ten to thirty cents on the dollar of these predetermined shares. Thus, if a trust values a wrongful death claim at $100,000, the claimant receives between $10,000 and $30,000 because the manufacturer has declared bankruptcy. In no instance can a plaintiff recover more than the total value of his or her case since both tort and trust defendants have the right to recover any overpayment from those that have underpaid, which is by definition every trust.

Plaintiffs' lawyers generally are not concerned by such findings. Many plaintiffs' lawyers believe that focusing on solvent defendants is entirely appropriate given that they have a responsibility to maximize the compensation their clients receive. Many plaintiffs' attorneys also argued that defense lawyers had many ways to establish different theories of exposure. Theoretically, this could be done by examining ship logs, work histories, etc. They also note that all exposures are often identified if a case proceeds to verdict. There is usually no such full disclosure in settlements.

=== Delayed filings and failure to disclose ===
Plaintiffs attorneys routinely delay filing claims against asbestos bankruptcy trusts in order to facilitate lawsuits against solvent defendants. This is done because such claims would necessarily dilute the liability of solvent defendants. Plaintiffs attorneys also routinely delay production of claim forms until the very last moment possible in order to prevent defendants from gather counter evidence and develop affirmative defenses. In recognition of the prejudice this causes defendants, courts often extend or reopen discovery when the failure to produce trust claims is exposed. In Edwards production of claim forms was delayed until two weeks before trial. In Warfield production was delayed until the night before the trial. In Stoeckler the defendants discovered that the plaintiff did not disclose trust claims only three days after the start of the trial.

It is often argued that the undisclosed claims are not material because they were only "deferral claims" filed to toll the statute of limitations against trusts for which no liability has yet been discovered. In Barnes & Crisafi the court determined that no such distinction could be made. Plaintiffs will also often say they don't know about claims filed by other law firms. In Stoeckler, the plaintiff's lawyer denied any knowledge of multiple past trust claims. In response to such arguments judges will often adopt mandatory disclosure obligations for bankruptcy trust claims.

In the Garlock bankruptcy Judge Hodges found numerous instances of plaintiff counsel improperly withholding production of trust claims. Garlock was allowed to conduct discovery regarding fifteen plaintiffs represented by five different law firms; Garlock found failure to produce in each and every case. Plaintiffs produced 32 claims but failed to produce another 284 claims.

=== Payments by injury type ===
The relatively high compensation received by claimants with non-malignant injuries has been an ongoing problem. Ten of the 26 known active trusts in 2008 report their payouts broken down by malignant and non-malignant injuries. During 2007 and 2008 combined, 86 percent of the claims these trusts reported were for non-malignant injuries. Non-malignant claims represented 37 percent of reported trust expenditures in these years.

== Trustees, trust advisory committees, and future claimants' representatives ==
Asbestos bankruptcy trust are governed by trustees who in turn are advised by trust advisory committees (TACs) and future claimants' representatives (FCRs). TACs are generally controlled by lawyers from a few prominent firms such as Baron & Budd, P.C. and Weitz & Luxenberg. Trusts must obtain the consent of TACs and FCRs before taking any major action.

== Medicaid and Medicare fraud investigation ==
In late 2016, attorneys general from 13 states sent demand letters to bankruptcy trusts for Armstrong World Industries, Babcock & Wilcox, DII, and Owens Corning. The purpose of the demand letters was to determine if the funds are reimbursing states for medical treatment received under Medicaid and Medicare. The federal Medicare Secondary Payer law imposes penalties for paying settlements directly to claimants without repaying the government for medical costs covered under the same programs under the legal doctrine of subrogation. Possible penalties can include double damages. Plaintiff attorneys can be held liable under this law. Many private insurance companies that provide supplemental Medicare coverage have filed similar lawsuits.

The same attorneys general filed suit in federal court in Utah to force discovery in early 2017. Defense counsel responded to the suit by arguing that the plaintiffs lack jurisdiction and that their requests are overbroad.

A judge dropped complaints from several states involved in the suit.

== See also ==
- Asbestos and the law (United States)
