= Henry G. Brinton =

American writer

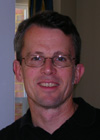
- Henry G. Brinton
- Born: February 21, 1960 (age 65); Washington, D.C.

Henry G. Brinton (born February 21, 1960) is a contributor to The Washington Post and USA Today, and author of the books Balancing Acts: Obligation, Liberation, and Contemporary Christian Conflicts (CSS Publishing, 2006), The Welcoming Congregation: Roots and Fruits of Christian Hospitality (Westminster John Knox Press, 2012), and three mystery novels City of Peace (Koehler Books, 2018), Windows of the Heavens (Resource Publications, 2021), and War Bug (Resource Publications, 2024). He is the senior pastor of Fairfax Presbyterian Church, and writes for the preaching journals Homiletics and Proclaim. He lives in Occoquan, Virginia, outside of Washington, D.C. Henry and his wife, Nancy Freeborne-Brinton, have two children, Sarah (Sadie) and Samuel Brinton.

== Early years ==
Henry was born on February 21, 1960, in Washington, D.C., and grew up in Bowie, Maryland. His parents are the late Henry C. Brinton, a NASA scientist, and Mary L. Brinton, a kindergarten teacher. He went to Samuel Ogle Junior High School and, later, Bowie High School. He then attended Duke University, where he went on an archaeological dig in Israel. This caused Henry to turn to the religious life, which he pursued through studies at Yale Divinity School and parish ministry in the Presbyterian Church (U.S.A.).

He is pastor of the Fairfax Presbyterian Church in Fairfax, Virginia.

== Books ==
- Balancing Acts: Obligation, Liberation, and Contemporary Christian Conflicts (2006)
- Ten Commandments of Faith and Fitness (2008), with co-author Vik Khanna, is grounded in Henry's experience as an endurance athlete. Henry has completed a marathon, century (100-mile) bike ride, or sprint triathlon every year since 2000.
- Immersion Bible Studies: Revelation (2011)
- The Welcoming Congregation: Roots and Fruits of Christian Hospitality (2012)
- City of Peace (2019)
- Windows of the Heavens (2021) the sequel to City of Peace
- War Bug (2024) is the third in his series of Occoquan-based novels.
