= Eldon E. Fallon =

American judge (born 1939)

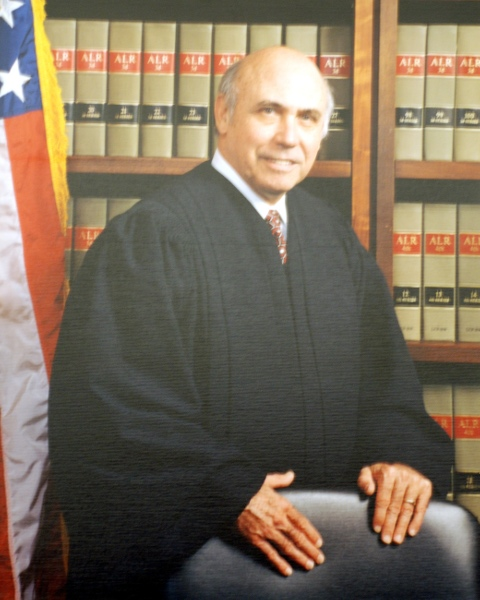

Senior Judge of the United States District Court for the Eastern District of Louisiana
- Incumbent
- Assumed office January 1, 2024

Judge of the United States District Court for the Eastern District of Louisiana
- In office May 10, 1995 – January 1, 2024
- Appointed by: Bill Clinton
- Preceded by: Adrian G. Duplantier
- Succeeded by: William J. Crain

Personal details
- Born: February 16, 1939 (age 87) New Orleans, Louisiana, U.S.
- Education: Tulane University (BA, JD); Yale University (LLM)

Eldon E. Fallon (born February 16, 1939) is a senior United States district judge of the United States District Court for the Eastern District of Louisiana. Referred as a pioneer in the creative use of multidistrict litigations and bellwether trials, Fallon has overseen several high-profile multidistrict litigation cases in recent years, including the Xarelto, Chinese Drywall, Vioxx, and Propulsid litigations.

== Early life and education ==
Born in New Orleans, Louisiana, Fallon received a Bachelor of Arts degree from Tulane University in 1959, a Juris Doctor from Tulane University Law School in 1962, and a Master of Laws from Yale Law School in 1963.

== Career ==
Prior to his judicial appointment, Fallon was in private practice in New Orleans from 1962 to 1995, and was also an adjunct professor at Tulane University Law School from 1975 to 1993. He is a member of the New Orleans, Louisiana State, American Bar Associations, the American College of Trial Lawyers and The American Law Institute. He also served as past president of the Louisiana State Bar Association and the Louisiana Bar Foundation.

=== Federal judicial service ===
Fallon was nominated by President Bill Clinton on February 3, 1995, to a seat on the United States District Court for the Eastern District of Louisiana vacated by Judge Adrian G. Duplantier. He was confirmed by the United States Senate on May 8, 1995, and received his commission on May 10, 1995. He assumed senior status on January 1, 2024.

=== Notable cases ===
In National Trust for Historic Preservation in the United States v. United States Department of Veterans Affairs, et al., Fallon ruled against two preservationists who did not want the U.S. Department of Veteran's Affairs and the State of Louisiana to build two new hospitals near the French Quarter in New Orleans. On March 31, 2010, Fallon found no reason to prevent the building project valued at $2 billion to move forward. Fallon's ruling found that there were enough environmental impact studies completed before moving the project forward, a main objection by the National Trust for Historic Preservation.

In Fernandez v. Knauf, et.al, Fallon presided over a trial for many homeowners who sued Knauf Plasterboard because the drywall has a sulfur type substance that deteriorated the drywall causing concerns that their homes may be unlivable. Fallon heard the case as part of 600 different cases that were consolidated into a special multi-district litigation case that would allow many other home owners to settle their cases out of court. In December 2011, Knauf proposed an unlimited settlement to repair the homes with the defective drywall. In addition, the company offered $30 million for those who reported health problems because of the material.

== Honors ==
Fallon is the author of several books and law review articles, and has also received numerous awards in his legal career. Some of his achievements include the President's Award (1980 and 1988) and Lifetime Achievement Award (1987) from the Louisiana State Bar Association; National Pro Bono Public Award (1987) from the American Bar Association; Distinguished Attorney Award (1989) from the Louisiana Bar Foundation; American Bar Association, Tort, Trial & Insurance Practice Section, Pursuit of Justice Award (2005); American Board of Trial Advocates, The Thomas Jefferson Award (2008). In 2012, Judge Fallon received the Louisiana Bar Foundation Distinguished Jurist Award, and in 2013, was inducted into The National Trial Lawyers Hall of Fame. In 2016, the Judicial Panel on Multidistrict Litigation awarded Fallon with the Multidistrict Litigation Spirit Award.

== Sources ==
Legal offices
| Preceded by Adrian G. Duplantier | Judge of the United States District Court for the Eastern District of Louisiana; 1995–2024 | Succeeded by William J. Crain |
