= Knauf =

Building materials company

Knauf Gips KG
- Industry: Building materials
- Founded: 1932; 94 years ago
- Headquarters: Iphofen, Germany
- Number of locations: 150 (2012)
- Subsidiaries: Knauf Insulation; USG Corporation
- Website: knauf.com

Knauf Group is a multinational, family-owned company based in Iphofen, Germany, well known for drywall gypsum boards, founded in 1932. The company is a producer of building materials and construction systems comprising construction materials for drywall construction, plasterboard, cement boards, mineral fibre acoustic boards, dry mortars with gypsum for internal plaster and cement-based external plaster and insulating materials; glass wool, stone wool and other insulation materials under the company Knauf Insulation.

It has more than 150 production sites worldwide. It is one of the six producers which hold approximately 81% of the worldwide wallboard market (Georgia Pacific, Knauf, Siniat, National Gypsum Company, Saint-Gobain, and Yoshino Gypsum Co., Ltd).

In June 2018, USG entered into an agreement to be purchased by Knauf. It operates as an independent subsidiary of Knauf and continues to remain headquartered in Chicago, Illinois. The deal closed in April 2019.

In 2022, after the invasion of Ukraine by Russia, Yale University published a list of companies that chose to remain active in Russia. According to this report, over 600 companies have withdrawn from Russia — but some remain. Knauf is still operating across 14 sites in Russia but has claimed to have suspended new investments.

In November 2023 Ukraine listed Knauf as an International Sponsor of War for promoting mobilisation in Russia by sending its employees to the war against Ukraine.

According to German public-service broadcaster ARD, Knauf has been active in collaborating with the Russian military in its construction efforts in the Russian-occupied areas of Ukraine.

== See also ==
- Chinese drywall
- Knauf Insulation
- Knauf USG Systems
