= Joseph Corbett Jr. =

American convicted murderer (1928–2009)

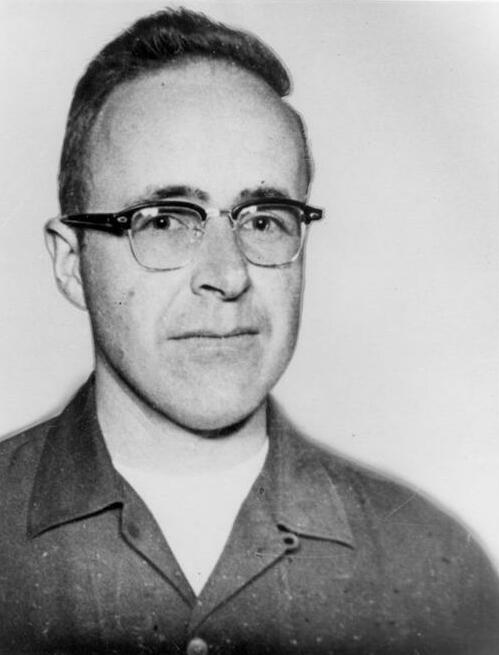
- Photograph taken 1959

FBI Ten Most Wanted Fugitive
- Charges: Murder; Interstate flight
- Alias: Walter Osborne

Description
- Born: October 25, 1928; Seattle, Washington, U.S.
- Died: August 24, 2009 (aged 80); Denver, Colorado, U.S.

Status
- Convictions: First degree murder Second degree murder
- Penalty: Life imprisonment
- Status: Paroled (1980)
- Added: March 30, 1960
- Caught: October 29, 1960
- Number: 127
- Captured

Joseph Corbett Jr. (October 25, 1928 – August 24, 2009) was an American convicted murderer and fugitive who, in 1960, was placed on the FBI Ten Most Wanted Fugitives list for the kidnapping and murder of Adolph Coors III, heir to the Coors beer fortune.

A native of Seattle and a Fulbright scholar, Corbett was arrested in Canada after spending seven months on the run. He was convicted of murdering Coors and sentenced to life imprisonment. Eventually released on parole, Corbett died by suicide in 2009 at the age of 80.

== Background ==
Joseph Corbett Jr. was born in Seattle, Washington on October 25, 1928. In 1949, Corbett's mother, Marion, died at the age of 49 after falling 15 feet from a balcony. Corbett grew depressed following the death of his mother. He said in a 1951 interview, "I was broken about it... I was never close to my father. We didn't go out or talk things over together."

Corbett was described as being highly intelligent and having a near-genius level IQ. He studied physics at the University of Washington, where he achieved top grades and competed on the school's rowing team in his freshman year. Corbett enrolled at University of California, Berkeley as a pre-medical student in 1950.

== First murder and escape ==
On January 13, 1951, Corbett was arrested and charged with first-degree murder in the December 22, 1950, shooting death and robbery of Air Force Sergeant Allen Lee Reed. Corbett was arrested while driving a stolen car, and a gun that matched the type used in the killing was found in the car. Although he initially denied involvement, Corbett eventually admitted to killing Reed, but maintained that he had acted in self-defense. In an interview with the San Francisco Chronicle conducted after his arrest, Corbett said, "I am not guilty of premeditated murder... I'd probably shoot myself before I'd shoot someone else..."

Corbett appeared in court on February 16, where he pleaded not guilty to Reed's killing, and his trial was scheduled for April 2. On the advice of his father and his attorney, Corbett changed his plea to guilty to the charge of second-degree murder on March 15. He was sentenced to life imprisonment with a minimum term of five years. Corbett was admitted to San Quentin State Prison on March 19, and expressed an interest in continuing his physics studies while incarcerated.

Corbett was transferred to the California Institution for Men (CIM) in Chino in April 1955. In the early morning hours of August 1, 1955, Corbett escaped from CIM by crawling through a window in the shower room and scaling a fence. He initially fled to Glendale, where he briefly found employment as a clerk using the alias "Walter Osborne". Corbett left Glendale at the end of August 1955 for Los Angeles, where he worked for an ice company under the Osborne alias. Corbett left Los Angeles in early November, arriving in Denver, Colorado by December 1955. He settled in Denver, where he rented an apartment and found work at a paint factory in early 1956.

== Murder of Adolph Coors III ==
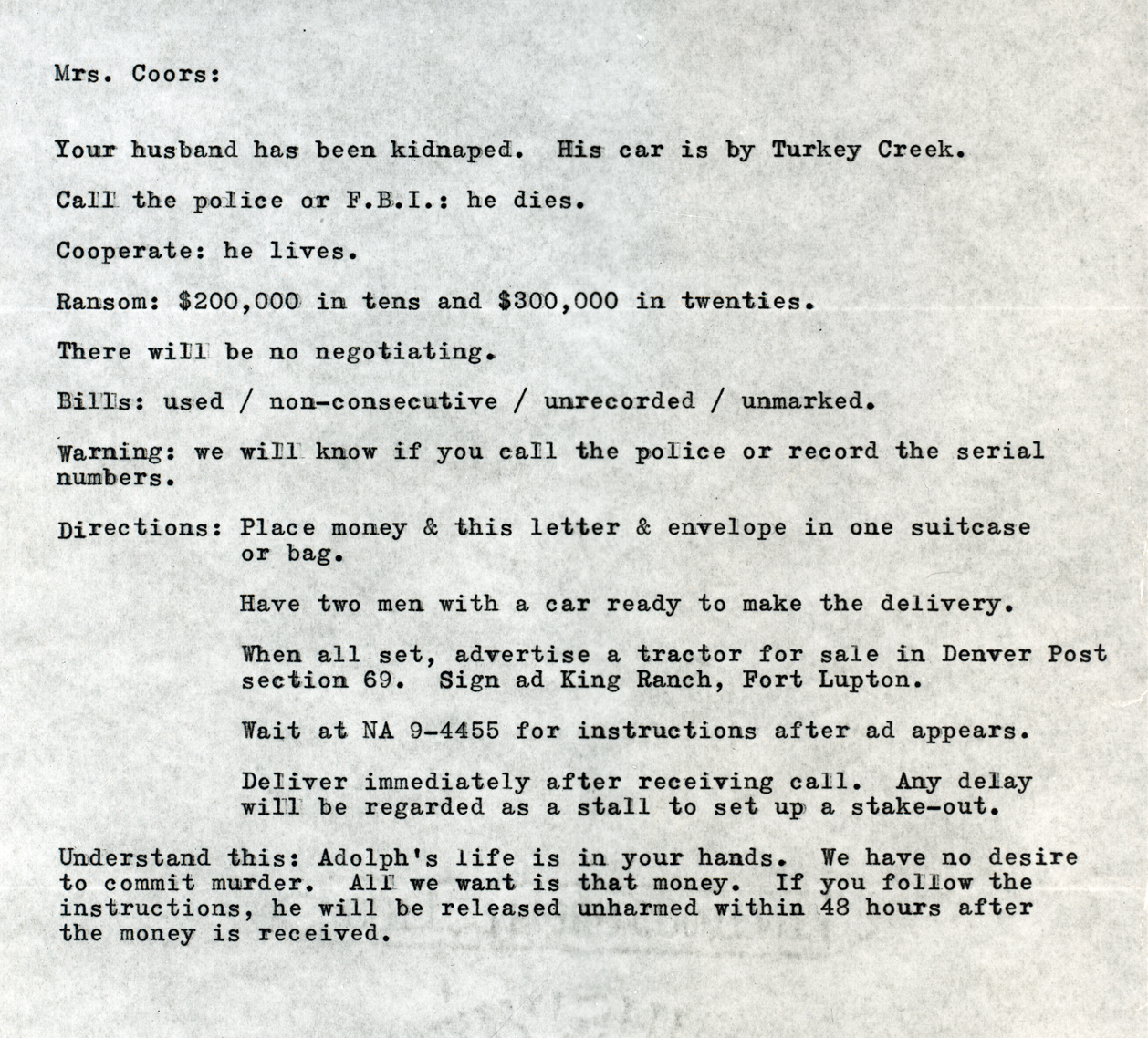
The ransom note

On the morning of February 9, 1960, Adolph Coors III, the 45-year-old CEO and chairman of the board of the Coors brewery, left his house for work, but never arrived. A delivery man found Coors' station wagon abandoned, and blood droplets were found nearby. Corbett was implicated, and the FBI began a manhunt that spanned from California to Atlantic City, New Jersey, and eventually to Vancouver, British Columbia, Canada. In March 1960, the FBI added Corbett to its Ten Most Wanted list.

On September 11, 1960, Coors' remains were found in the local forest, with two bullet wounds in his back.

Corbett was arrested on October 29, 1960 in Vancouver by Canadian police. The FBI had issued wanted poster-style photo copies, and a woman called in, stating a man of his description was in her area. Afterwards, the Vancouver police saw his car parked outside a motor inn. He was extradited back to the U.S. Since the kidnap and murder occurred in Colorado, the state charged Corbett with murder. Because Coors’ remains were found within the state, Corbett was not tried on federal kidnapping charges.

On March 29, 1961, Corbett was convicted of first degree murder and sentenced to life imprisonment. He was paroled and released from prison on December 12, 1980.

In 1996, Corbett gave his only interview following his release from prison; in it, he maintained his innocence. However, Corbett did not try to prove his innocence, insisting that attempting to do so would only attract unwanted attention.

Corbett died by suicide by a single gunshot wound in the head on August 24, 2009, at the age of 80. He had been diagnosed with cancer shortly before his death and his health had been rapidly deterioriating.
