= Personal injury trust =

A personal injury trust is a legal term of art in the modern English law of trusts and is also applicable, where relevant, to Wales, Scotland and Northern Ireland.

A personal injury trust is a form of trust, a legally binding arrangement, in which funds are held by persons, called trustees, for the benefit of others upon the terms of a document, called a trust deed.

"A trust does not need to have a specific generic title or be one sort of trust or another at law to be a personal injury trust. It is the source of the trust fund which determines the trust's nature ... needs ... relevant circumstances and the relevant law should dictate the type of trust. But whatever legal type of trust it is, if it is funded by an award of compensation for a personal injury then it will be a personal injury trust."

== Special characteristics ==
A personal injury trust has several special characteristics:

- It is constituted exclusively by funds derived from a payment (or payments) made in consequence of a personal injury e.g. compensation for a road traffic accident.
- The person founding the trust (called the settlor) will be the injured party (that is except in limited circumstances involving an official compensatory body such as the Criminal Injuries Compensation Authority).
- The person founding the trust from their payment must also be the sole beneficiary or at least one of the potential beneficiaries of the trust.

These are important because it means that a trust does not need to have a generic title or label or be one particular type of trust or another at English law to be considered a personal injury trust. It is or is not a personal injury trust on account of its source and the involvement of the injured settlor.

== Types of trust ==
A personal injury trust can be:

- a bare trust where the money involved, the trust fund, is held for the injured party outright with administrative powers being given to the trustees. Upon the death of that person it forms part of their estate and passes under their will or under the law of intestacy which operates when there is no will.
- a life interest trust where the trust fund is held by the trustees for the life of the injured party for their benefit and then after their death it passes to others under the terms of the trust.
- a discretionary trust where the trust fund is held by the trustees for the benefit of the injured party and potentially others at the discretion of the trustees. The trust may continue or be wound up when the injured party dies.
- a hybrid trust such as a flexible life interest combining features of the life and discretionary trust as desired.

The needs of the settlor, their family circumstances and tax or other relevant law should dictate the type of trust used. But whatever the legal type of the trust, if it is funded by an award of compensation for a personal injury then it will be a personal injury trust.

Personal injury trusts are sometimes referred to as special needs trusts but that expression is more general and can create confusion with certain trusts in other jurisdictions. A more accurate and informative alternative description might be compensation protection trust as that alludes to its actual purpose under English law.

== Role and practice ==
The role and practice of personal injury trusts under English law.

(1) Basic advantages

The existence of a personal injury trust can enable the injured party to obtain certain means-tested State benefits entitlements and to make the best use of the award under English law but there are also other potential advantages.

(2) When advice should be given/sought.

Advice on personal injury trusts is usually given by lawyers involved in all injury related cases concerning:

- Accidental injuries
- Criminal injuries
- Clinical and other medical negligence causing injury
- Compensation given for any disease or injury caused as a result of a disease

That is irrespective of whether or not the harm caused was physical or mental. It is irrespective of where the injury occurred. It may have occurred in the UK or abroad. It is also irrespective of the size of the payment made.

(3) Means-tested benefits advantages.

A personal injury trust is also considered relevant even if a person is not currently in receipt of means-tested benefits. That is because they might potentially have access to them in the future if their "assessable capital" for means-testing purposes is low enough. Long-term care provision in England and Wales, either at home or in a care home, is a means-tested benefit provided by or through local authorities.

(4) Other practical advantages of a personal injury trust.

There are also other potential advantages of personal injury trusts apart from the retention of means-tested benefits. That is particularly in the case of older, very young, mentally incapable or other vulnerable persons:

- They may have no experience of handling a large sum of money.
- They may want the protection which trustees can offer against grasping relatives.
- They may have unstable mental conditions which renders the use of trustees helpful.
- They may just want to get on with their lives without having to concern themselves with financial administration.
- They may fear the impact of divorce and separation on their finances and want to try and ring-fence their resources in some way.

(5) Further points of note.

Under English law:

- The award placed in the personal injury trust may be negotiated or mediated and no court order making an award is required to facilitate a personal injury trust unless the compensated person is either a minor or mentally incapable of managing their own affairs.
- Cases involving minors will involve the High Court agreeing to the foundation of a personal injury trust.
- Cases involving mentally incapable persons will involve the Court of Protection agreeing to the foundation of a personal injury trust.

(6) Tax issues.

Personal injury trusts usually carry no UK tax advantages. Compensated people need access to their award via their chosen trustees. Thus it is essential that they retain an interest as a named beneficiary in the award which they settle to form the trust fund.

The UK taxation anti-avoidance rules prevent tax advantages being given to such settlor interested trusts. They apply to settlor interested personal injury trusts in the same way as they apply to trusts founded from non-personal injury related funds.

Personal injury trusts can create adverse tax consequences under UK tax law if the wrong sort is chosen. For example, if an award of more than the nil rate band for inheritance tax is placed in a discretionary trust or (since 21 March 2006) an ordinary life interest trust, an inheritance tax charge on the surplus becomes due immediately. The limit is £325,000 for the 2009-10 tax year. Above that a 20% charge at the inheritance tax lifetime rate will apply to the surplus.

Importantly the above adverse tax consequences do not apply to bare trusts and certain other highly specialised types of trust arrangement.

(7) Investment of personal injury awards.

UK trustees are generally expected to comply with the Trustee Act 2000 and the wider legal framework governing trustee investment, which is a complex and technical field.
