= Chinese drywall scandal =

Environmental health issue involving defective drywall manufactured in China

"Chinese drywall" refers to an environmental health issue involving defective drywall manufactured in China, imported to the United States and used in residential construction between 2001 and 2009 – affecting "an estimated 100,000 homes in more than 20 states".

In samples of contaminated drywall, laboratory tests will detect off-gassing of volatile chemicals and sulfurous gases — including carbon disulfide, carbonyl sulfide, and hydrogen sulfide. The emissions worsen as temperature and humidity rise, will give off a sulfuric (rotten egg) odor and will cause copper surfaces to turn black and powdery, a chemical process indicative of a hydrogen sulfide reaction and an early indication of contaminated drywall. Copper pipes, electrical wiring, and air conditioner coils are affected, as well as silver jewelry.

Homeowners have reported health symptoms including respiratory problems such as asthma attacks, chronic coughing and difficulty breathing, as well as chronic headaches and sinus issues.

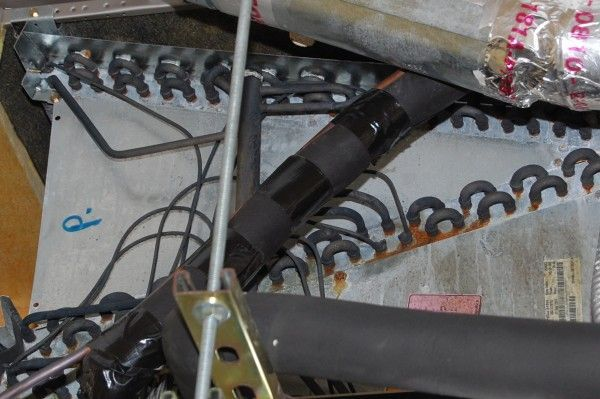
The copper coils on this air conditioner unit are blackened and corroded.

== Background ==
Drywall, also known as plasterboard, is a building material typically consisting of gypsum-based plaster extruded between two thick sheets of paper and kiln-dried.

Drywall was imported by the United States during the construction boom between 2004 and 2007, spurred by a shortage of American-made drywall due to the rebuilding demand of nine hurricanes that made landfall in the Southeast from 2004 to 2005.

An analysis covering drywall imports since January 2006 showed that more than 550 million pounds (250,000 t) of Chinese drywall was brought into the United States since then, enough to build 60,000 average-sized homes.

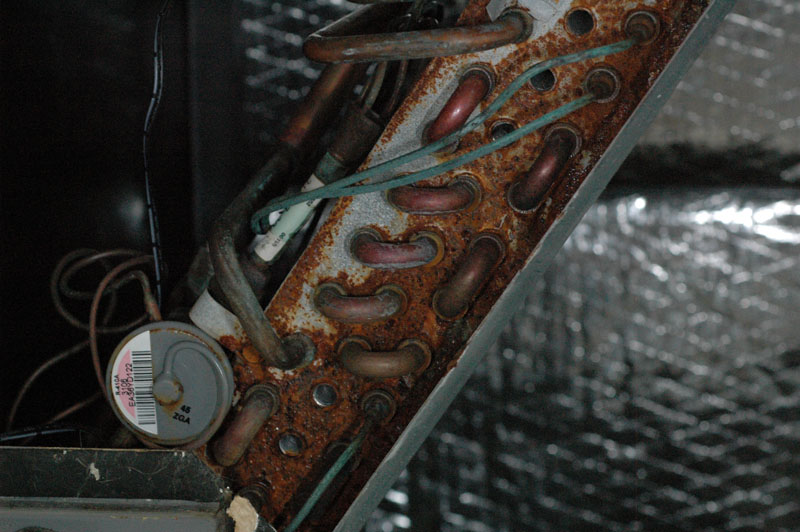
The green and red coloration in these copper components is an indicator that they were subject to typical corrosion, and not as a result of hydrogen sulfide emitted from contaminated imported drywall.

Homeowners alleging contaminated drywall have reported numerous incidents of corroding copper and other metals in their homes. The Florida Department of Health advised homeowners worried about tainted drywall to check copper tubing coils located in air conditioning and refrigeration units for signs of corrosion caused by hydrogen sulfide, as these are usually the first signs of the issue. Under normal circumstances, copper corrosion leaves it a blue/green or dark red color, whereas corrosion as a result of hydrogen sulfide exposure leaves a black ash-like corrosion. Homeowners who have verified that their home contains contaminated Chinese drywall are advised to replace any suspect drywall, as well as any potentially damaged copper electrical wiring, fire alarm systems, copper piping, and gas piping.

== Affected locales ==
In the United States, most complaints have come from states in the Southeast, where a warm and humid climate seems to encourage the emissions. According to published reports, "Chinese drywall was used in the construction of thousands of homes, mainly in the South, after a series of hurricanes in 2005 and before the housing bubble burst."

The states of Florida (56%), Louisiana (18%), Mississippi (6%) and Alabama (6%) made up 86% of the 3,952 cases reported to the U.S. Consumer Product Safety Commission (CPSC) as of April 19, 2012. More than 700 complaints had been filed with the Florida Department of Health. Sources estimated that from 60,000 to 100,000 homes could be affected.

The CPSC has released a guide for identifying the symptoms of a home affected by the problem drywall.

== Sources ==
Knauf Plasterboard Tianjin Co., Ltd., part of Knauf Gips KG, has been identified as a major producer of imported Chinese drywall. Though a number of other Chinese companies are believed to have produced defective drywall, Knauf's name comes up most frequently, because the company prints its name on its products. Much of the other contaminated drywall has no markings, making it difficult to identify its origin.

Dramatic increases in new home construction, coupled with the reconstruction effort after hurricane damage, led to a soaring increase in the quantity of imported Chinese drywall. Time magazine reported that more than 550 million pounds (250,000 t) of drywall was imported from China from 2006 to 2009, including much from the known principal manufacturer of the contaminated drywall, Knauf. However, domestic drywall manufacturing averages over 15 million short tons (30 billion pounds; 14 million tonnes) per year, leaving imported Chinese drywall with only a small portion of the market. It is estimated that this imported drywall has been used to construct approximately 60,000 homes.

From January to September 2006, 52 million pounds (24,000 t) of Knauf drywall were unloaded in New Orleans, three-quarters of it from Knauf Tianjin, and at least 37 million pounds (17,000 t) of Knauf drywall was shipped directly from China to Florida ports.

Drywall usually has a source printed on the back. Chinese drywall may be marked "Made in China", "China", "Knauf Tianjin", or have no marking at all. A home may have been built with drywall from several sources, American and imported.

In April 2009, home improvement stores The Home Depot and Lowe's confirmed from their suppliers that no drywall sold in their stores was imported from China. Lowes did eventually settle lawsuits by offering up to $100,000 for each affected home but denied selling Chinese drywall.

On November 23, 2009, CBS News reported that they had done a drywall study to compare American and Chinese drywall. Random samples of new American-made drywall in six U.S. cities, new Chinese-made drywall from China, and samples of drywall from five damaged U.S. homes were collected and sent to the University of Florida to be tested by a team of researchers led by professor Tim Townsend, a scientist and leading expert on the effects of drywall on the environment. The report results stated:

As expected, the contaminated Chinese samples gave off high levels of sulfur gases. But all but one of the U.S. samples emitted sulfur gases, as well — not at levels as high as the defective Chinese product. There were some American products that we tested that had higher emission than some of the new Chinese products that we tested.

== Federal inquiries ==
Discussions began in January 2009 between the U.S. Consumer Product Safety Commission (CPSC), the U.S. Environmental Protection Agency (EPA) and Florida officials. In February 2009, U.S. Senator Bill Nelson of Florida sent a letter to the U.S. Consumer Product Safety Commission and the EPA, asking them to jointly investigate whether the Chinese drywall is toxic, and to determine the extent of potential damage to homes. The Consumer Product Safety Commission launched a formal investigation.

In April 2009, as concerns about the defective drywall grew, Senator Nelson of Florida and Senator Mary Landrieu of Louisiana jointly introduced a resolution and bill urging the Consumer Product Safety Commission to recall Chinese-made drywall and temporarily ban its import.

In May 2009, the U.S. House of Representatives passed an amendment to the Mortgage Reform and Anti-Predatory Lending Act (H.R. 1728) that would require the Department of Housing and Urban Development (HUD) to study the effects of tainted Chinese drywall on foreclosures and the availability of property insurance. This measure did not pass as a standalone bill, but was incorporated into the Dodd–Frank Wall Street Reform and Consumer Protection Act (Subtitle H (Miscellaneous Provisions), Section 1494), signed into law on July 21, 2010.

In November 2009, the CPSC reported on an indoor air study conducted by the Center for Disease Control (CDC) comparing 41 "complaint" homes in five states with 10 control homes built around the same time. The report found a "strong association" between the imported drywall and levels of hydrogen sulfide gas and metal corrosion in the complaint homes.

== Potential causes ==
Lab comparisons of Chinese- and American-made drywall show significantly higher levels of pyrite in the Chinese material. This suggests that pyrite oxidation may be the source of the sulfur compounds released by Chinese drywall.

The problems have been attributed to the use of fly ash in the drywall, which degrades in the presence of heat and moisture; although United States' drywall uses fly ash as well, the process used creates a cleaner final product.

According to a 2010 laboratory study, one hundred percent of affected drywall samples obtained from homes located in the southeastern United States tested positive for the presence of Acidithiobacillus ferrooxidans, an iron and sulfur reducing bacterium. Samples of non-contaminated drywall were found to contain only minuscule levels of A. ferrooxidans.

Forensic analyses suggest that disproportionation of elemental sulfur to hydrogen sulfide and sulfuric acid, caused by bacteria, was the primary cause of the malodors.

== Potential health concerns ==
There are few studies exploring the effects of long-term low-level exposure to sulfur gases. However, it is believed that short-term exposure, over the period of a few hours, can result in sore throat, eye irritation, cough, shortness of breath, chest pain, and nausea. Long term exposure, over a period of weeks, is believed to cause chronic fatigue, insomnia, loss of appetite, dizziness, irritability, headaches, and memory loss.

The Center for Disease Control, in collaboration with the Agency for Toxic Substances and Disease Registry, released a guide indicating the residents of affected homes reported irritated and itchy eyes and skin, difficulty breathing, persistent cough, bloody noses, runny noses, recurrent headaches, sinus infection, and asthma attacks.

== Scam warnings ==
The Florida Attorney General's office has warned of several deceptive practices targeted at homeowners, including bogus test kits, home inspection offers, ozone generators and chemical cleaners. The warnings point out that the presence of defective drywall cannot be determined by testing a home's air, or corrected by chemical sprays or ozone generators.

News reports have pointed out "convicted scammers, thieves and uncertified workers who illegally pose as licensed contractors" and profit from homeowner confusion and panic. The Palm Beach Post found that of 47 remediation and inspection companies checked, 26 were created since January 2009, and only 18 of the 47 were run by licensed contractors. In Florida, lack of legal regulation allows anyone to "remediate" drywall problems, regardless of training or professional qualifications.

== Lawsuits ==
Class action lawsuits claiming respiratory problems and headaches have been filed by Florida homeowners against home builders, drywall suppliers, and a Chinese drywall manufacturer.

In October 2010, U.S. District Judge Eldon E. Fallon in New Orleans endorsed a settlement in which Knauf Group will pay for the repair of 300 homes of the 3,000 involved in one particular case. Several insurance companies are participating in the agreement. The homes are in Alabama, Florida, Louisiana and Mississippi, but no Texas and Virginia homes are affected by the agreement.

Home supply retailer Lowe's has denied claims that they have sold contaminated drywall imported from China. Numerous class action lawsuits were brought against the company, and as of October 28, 2010, Lowe's has agreed to a settlement that may award victims up to $100,000 for damages caused by contaminated drywall purchased at their stores.

== Insurance coverage and tax deductions ==
Controversy has arisen over whether the damage will be covered under the insurance policies for home insurance or general liability insurance. In March 2010, a New Orleans judge ruled that the damage was covered under a home insurance policy. It is unknown whether the general liability insurance will cover the claims. The standard policy contained an exception to an exclusion for pollution which allowed coverage if the pollution came from the products of the insured, but insurers had revised the policies to incorporate a "total pollution exclusion" which has no exception. Even without a total pollution exclusion, around 2005 insurers began inserting another provision to deny construction defect claims. Whether or not insurance coverage will be granted generally depends on state law and a state court's interpretation, but in this case may be determined for multiple states under the Louisiana multiple district litigation (MDL) overseen by a federal court.

On September 30, 2010, the Internal Revenue Service announced it would provide tax relief for homeowners affected by property damage caused by imported Chinese drywall. The IRS has categorized the copper corrosion from the sulfur gasses emitted by the imported drywall as "casualty loss", and is in a similar category to property damage after a catastrophic event, such as a hurricane. However, homeowners can only claim a deduction after repairing the affected area(s), and much controversy has arisen because of the great out-of-pocket expense to affected homeowners.

== Radioactivity concerns ==
Early reporting raised concerns about the presence of phosphogypsum, gypsum formed as a by-product of processing phosphate ore into fertilizer with sulfuric acid. Phosphogypsum is radioactive due to the presence of naturally occurring uranium and radium in the phosphate ore. The substance has been banned for use in U.S. construction since 1989. Tests of drywall samples by the EPA and the Florida Department of Health showed radioactivity at levels no higher than those ordinarily found in the natural environment.
