= List of justices of the Delaware Supreme Court =

The following is a list of justices of the Delaware Supreme Court. From 1772 to 1950, Delaware did not have appointed Supreme Court justices. Instead, appeals from intermediate appellate determinations were taken to "The High Court of Errors and Appeals" – a panel made up of the state Chancellor, and all judges of the "Supreme Court" and of the Courts of Common Pleas who had not previously been involved with the case; under that system, the sole "Supreme Court" justice was the chief justice of Delaware.

In 1950, Delaware created a new state Supreme Court, with three judges appointed by the governor.

== Colonial Supreme Court of the Lower Counties ==
=== Chief justices ===
| Judge | Began active service | Ended active service | Notes |
|---|---|---|---|
| William Clarke | 1684 | 1707 | Also a justice of the Pennsylvania Supreme Court. |
| Jasper Yeates | 1707 | 1710 | – |
| John Healey | 1710 | 1714 | – |
| Richard Birmingham | 1714 | 1717 | – |
| Jasper Yeates | 1717 | 1720 | – |
| John French | 1726 | 1727 | – |
| David Evans | 1727 | 1741 | – |
| Samuel Chew | 1741 | 1743 | – |
| William Till | 1743 | 1745 | – |
| Ryves Holt | 1745 | 1764 | – |
| John Vining | 1764 | 1770 | – |
| Richard McWilliam Jr. | 1773 | 1777 | – |

=== Associate justices ===
| Judge | Began active service | Ended active service | Notes |
|---|---|---|---|
| Arthur Cook | 1690 | 1699 | – |
| Berkeley Codd | 1710 | after 1723 | – |
| Richard Birmingham | 1713 | 1717 | Chief Justice from 1714 to 1717 |
| Jehu Curtis | 1743 | 1753 | – |
| Nicholas Ridgely | 1746 | 1755 | – |

== Chief justices of the High Court of Errors and Appeals (1777–1951) ==
| Judge | Began active service | Ended active service |
|---|---|---|
| William Killen | 1777 | 1793 |
| Richard Bassett | 1793 | 1793 |
| George Read | 1793 | 1798 |
| Kensey Johns | 1799 | 1799 |
| James Booth Sr. | 1799 | 1828 |
| Thomas Clayton | 1828 | 1830 |
| Samuel Maxwell Harrington | 1830 | 1837 |
| John M. Clayton | 1837 | 1839 |
| Richard H. Bayard | 1839 | 1841 |
| James Booth Jr. | 1841 | 1855 |
| Samuel Maxwell Harrington | 1855 | 1857 |
| Edward Gilpin | 1857 | 1876 |
| Joseph P. Comegys | 1876 | 1893 |
| Charles B. Lore | 1893 | 1909 |
| James Pennewill | 1909 | 1933 |
| Daniel J. Layton | 1933 | 1945 |
| Charles S. Richards | 1945 | 1951 |

== Justices of the Delaware Supreme Court (1951–present) ==
| Judge | Began active service | Ended active service | Term as chief justice |
|---|---|---|---|
| Clarence A. Southerland | 1951 | 1963 | 1951–1963 |
| James M. Tunnell Jr. | 1951 | 1954 | |
| Daniel F. Wolcott | 1951 | 1973 | 1964–1973 |
| Howard W. Bramhall | 1954 | 1962 | |
| Charles L. Terry Jr. | 1962 | 1964 | 1963–1964 |
| James B. Carey | 1963 | 1974 | |
| Daniel L. Herrmann | 1965 | 1985 | 1973–1985 |
| William Duffy | 1973 | 1982 | |
| John J. McNeilly Jr. | 1974 | 1986 | |
| Henry R. Horsey | 1978 | 1994 | |
| William T. Quillen | 1978 | 1983 | |
| Andrew G. T. Moore II | 1982 | 1994 | |
| Andrew D. Christie | 1983 | 1992 | 1985–1992 |
| Randy J. Holland | 1986 | 2017 | |
| Joseph T. Walsh | 1985 | 2003 | |
| E. Norman Veasey | 1992 | 2004 | 1992–2004 |
| Carolyn Berger | 1994 | 2014 | |
| Maurice A. Hartnett III | 1994 | 2000 | |
| Myron T. Steele | 2000 | 2014 | 2004–2014 |
| Jack B. Jacobs | 2003 | 2014 | |
| Henry du Pont Ridgely | 2004 | 2015 | |
| Leo E. Strine Jr. | 2014 | 2019 | 2014–2019 |
| Karen L. Valihura | 2014 | 2026 | |
| James T. Vaughn Jr. | 2014 | 2023 | |
| Collins J. Seitz Jr. | 2015 | present | 2019–present |
| Gary Traynor | 2017 | present | |
| Tamika Montgomery-Reeves | 2019 | 2023 | |
| N. Christopher Griffiths | 2023 | present | |
| Abigail LeGrow | 2023 | present | |
| Morgan Zurn | 2026 | present | |
