= Government of Delaware =

State government of the United States

- Logo of the Delawarean government Great Seal of the State of Delaware
- Part of: United States of America
- Constitution: Constitution of Delaware

Legislative branch
- Name: General Assembly
- Type: Bicameral
- Meeting place: Delaware Legislative Hall
- Upper house
- Name: Senate
- Presiding officer: Kyle Evans Gay, President
- Lower house
- Name: House of Representatives
- Presiding officer: Peter Schwartzkopf, Speaker

Executive branch
- Head of state and government
- Title: Governor
- Currently: Matt Meyer
- Appointer: Election
- Cabinet
- Leader: Governor
- Deputy leader: Lieutenant Governor
- Headquarters: Delaware Legislative Hall

Judicial branch
- Courts: Courts of Delaware
- Delaware Supreme Court
- Chief judge: Collins J. Seitz Jr.
- Seat: Wilmington

The Government of Delaware encompasses the administrative structure of the US state of Delaware as established by its 1897 constitution. Analogously to the US federal government, it is composed of three branches: executive, legislative, and judicial. The Governor is head of the executive, the General Assembly is the legislature, and the Supreme Court is the highest court. The state is also organized into counties, municipalities, school districts, and special districts.

== Executive branch ==
The executive branch is headed by the Governor of Delaware. The present governor is Matt Meyer (D), who took office on January 21, 2025. The lieutenant governor is Kyle Evans Gay (D) since 2025. The Attorney General is Kathy Jennings (D) since 2019. The Treasurer is Colleen Davis (D) since 2019. The Auditor is Lydia York (D) since 2023. The Insurance Commissioner is Trinidad Navarro (D).

The governor presents a "State of the State" speech to a joint session of the Delaware legislature annually.

== Legislative branch ==
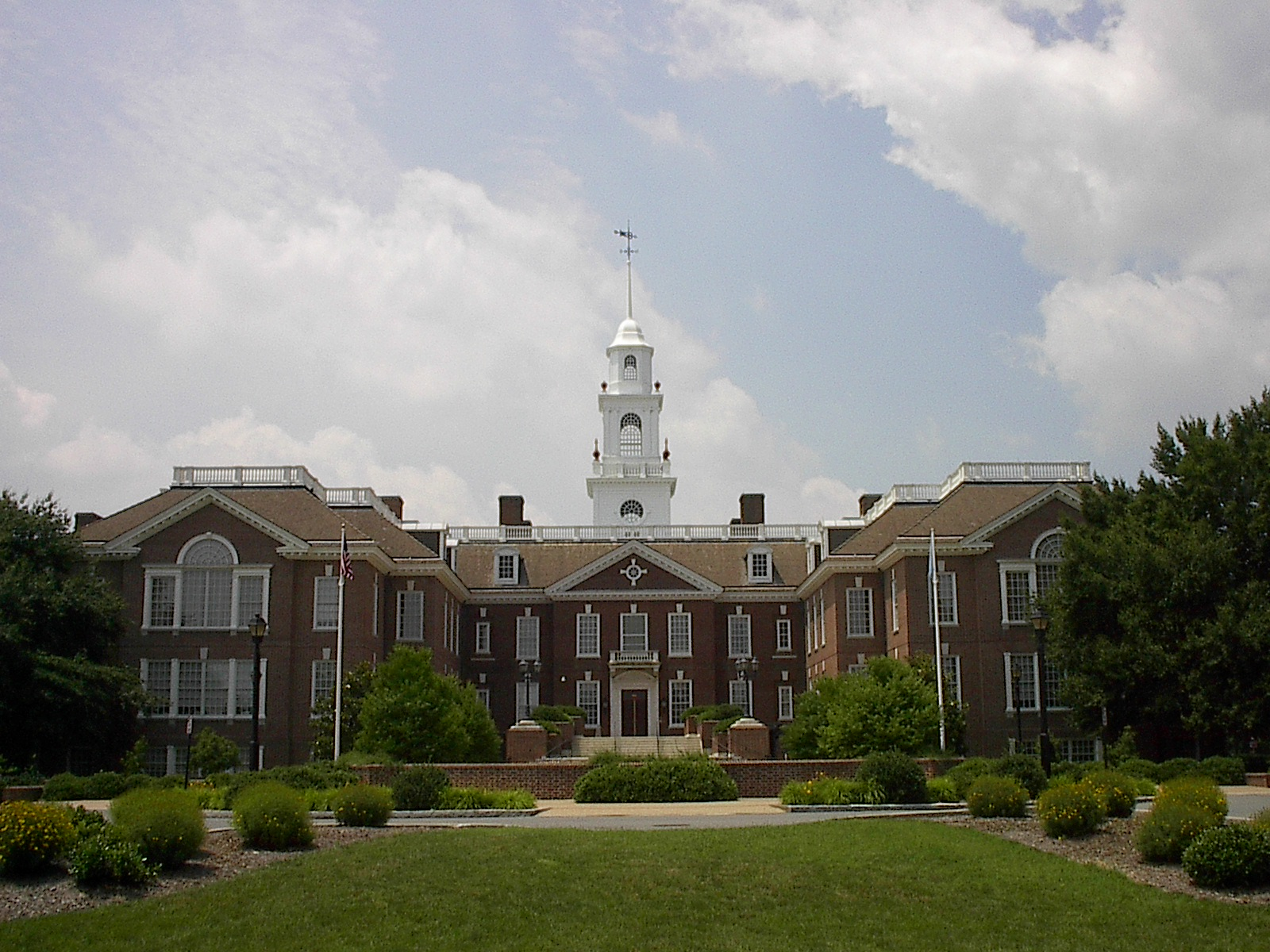
The Delaware General Assembly meets in the Legislative Hall in Dover.

The Delaware General Assembly is the legislature of the U.S. state of Delaware. It is a bicameral legislature composed of the Delaware Senate with 21 senators and the Delaware House of Representatives with 41 representatives. It meets at Legislative Hall in Dover, Delaware, convening on the second Tuesday of January of odd-numbered years, with a second session of the same Assembly convening likewise in even-numbered years. Normally the sessions are required to adjourn by the last day of June of the same calendar year. However, the Governor can call a special session of the legislature at any time.

Members are elected from single-member districts, all apportioned to roughly equal populations after each decennial Census. Elections are held on the Tuesday after the first Monday in November and about one-half of the Senate is elected every two years for a four-year term, and the entire House of Representatives is elected every two years for a two-year term. Vacancies are filled through special elections. There are no term limits for either chamber.

With 62 seats, the Delaware General Assembly is the second-smallest bicameral state legislature in the United States – ahead of Alaska (60 seats) and behind Nevada (63). The Senate confirms judicial and other nominees appointed by the governor. It is the only legislature with the power to unilaterally amend its constitution without requiring referendum or any other approval.

Delaware's U.S. Senators are Chris Coons (D) and Lisa Blunt Rochester (D). Delaware's at-large U.S. Representative is Sarah McBride (D).

== Judicial branch ==
The Delaware Constitution establishes a number of courts:

- The Delaware Supreme Court is the state's highest court.
- The Delaware Superior Court is the state's trial court of general jurisdiction.
- The Delaware Court of Chancery deals primarily in corporate disputes.
- The Family Court handles domestic and custody matters.
- The Delaware Court of Common Pleas has jurisdiction over a limited class of civil and criminal matters.

Minor non-constitutional courts include the Justice of the Peace Courts and Aldermen's Courts.

Significantly, Delaware has one of the few remaining Courts of Chancery in the nation, which has jurisdiction over equity cases, the vast majority of which are corporate disputes, many relating to mergers and acquisitions. The Court of Chancery and the Delaware Supreme Court have developed a worldwide reputation for rendering concise opinions concerning corporate law which generally (but not always) grant broad discretion to corporate boards of directors and officers. In addition, the Delaware General Corporation Law, which forms the basis of the Courts' opinions, is widely regarded as giving great flexibility to corporations to manage their affairs. For these reasons, Delaware is considered to have the most business-friendly legal system in the United States; therefore a great number of companies are incorporated in Delaware, including 60% of the companies listed on the New York Stock Exchange.

As of 2023, there are a total of 105 judicial off Delaware Courts.

- The Delaware Supreme Court contains one Chief Justice (Justice Seitz) and four Justices (Justice Traynor, Justice Valihura, Justice Vaughn). There is currently one vacancy on the Court due to the appointment of Justice Montgomery-Reeves to the U.S. Court of Appeals for the Third Circuit.
- The Delaware Superior Court contains one President Judge (Judge Jurden) and twenty Judges.
- The Delaware Court of Chancery consists of one Chancellor (Chancellor McCormick) and six Vice Chancellors.
- The Family Court consists of one Chief Judge (Judge Newell) and sixteen Judges.
- The Delaware Court of Common Pleas consists of nine Judges and two Commissioners.
- The Justice of the Peace Courts consist of One Chief Magistrate (Chief Magistrate Davis), and forty-three Justices of the Peace.

Delaware was the last U.S. state to use judicial corporal punishment, in 1952.

== Counties ==
Delaware is subdivided into three counties; from north to south they are New Castle, Kent and Sussex. This is the fewest among all states. Each county elects its own legislative body (known in New Castle and Sussex counties as County Council, and in Kent County as Levy Court), which deal primarily in zoning and development issues. Most functions which are handled on a county-by-county basis in other states—such as court and law enforcement—have been centralized in Delaware, leading to a significant concentration of power in the Delaware state government. The counties were historically divided into hundreds, which were used as tax reporting and voting districts until the 1960s, but now serve no administrative role, their only current official legal use being in real estate title descriptions.
