= James Booth (disambiguation) =

James Booth (1927–2005) was an English actor.

James Booth may also refer to:

- James Booth (landscaper), Scottish landscaper, see Caspar Voght
- James Booth (mathematician) (1806–1878), Irish cleric and educationist
- James Booth (MP), Member of Parliament (MP) for Horsham
- James Charles Booth (died 1778), English lawyer
- James Curtis Booth (1810–1888), American chemist
- James FitzGerald Booth, American musician
- James Scripps Booth (1888–1954), American automotive designer
- James W. Booth (1822–1876), New York politician
- James Booth (judge) (1914–2000), British judge and Liberal politician
- James Booth (legal writer) (1796–1880), secretary to the Board of Trade
- James Booth Sr. (1753–1828), politician and judge in Delaware
- James Booth Jr. (1789–1855), judge in Delaware
- James Booth, character in 1994 Baker Street: Sherlock Holmes Returns
- George Formby Sr. (1875–1921), comedian in the Music Halls

== See also ==
- James Boothe, character in Passions
- James Booth Lockwood (1852–1884), American arctic explorer
- George Formby Sr (James Lawler Booth, 1875–1921), English actor, singer and comedian
