= Samuel Harrington =

Samuel Harrington may refer to:

- Samuel Milby Harrington (1882–1948), United States Marine Corps general
- Samuel Maxwell Harrington (1803–1865), Delaware judge
- Samuel Maxwell Harrington Jr. (1840–1878), his son, lawyer, adjutant general and Delaware secretary of state

== See also ==
- Samuel Harrington Littell (1873–1967), bishop of Hawaii
