= Justice Booth =

Justice Booth

- James Booth Jr. (1789–1855), associate justice of the Delaware Supreme Court
- James Booth Sr. (1753–1828), chief justice of the Delaware Supreme Court
- Robert Booth (judge) (1626–1681), Lord Chief Justice of the King's Bench for Ireland

== See also ==
- Judge Booth (disambiguation)
