= Daniel J. Layton =

American judge (1879–1960)

Attorney General of Delaware (1932–1933) Chief Justice of Delaware Supreme Court (1933–1945)

Personal details
- Born: July 9, 1879 Georgetown, Delaware
- Died: May 13, 1960 (aged 80) Georgetown, Delaware
- Party: Republican

Daniel John Layton (August 1, 1879 – May 13, 1960) served on the Delaware Supreme Court as Chief Justice from 1933 to 1945. He had earlier served as an attorney general of Delaware from late 1932 until his nomination. He was a native of Sussex County, Delaware and the son of U.S. Representative Caleb R. Layton.

== Background ==
Layton studied at the University of Pennsylvania, where he also pitched for the baseball team. Following graduation from the University of Pennsylvania Law School and service in the offices of Ward & Gray in Wilmington, Layton was admitted to the Delaware bar in 1903. Layton then practiced law in Wilmington until 1915, when he returned to Georgetown to practice until his election as attorney general and later elevation to the Supreme Court.

== Service for the Supreme Court ==
Two weeks after the expiration of the second term of James Pennewill, the previous Chief Justice, Governor C. Douglass Buck announced the appointment of Daniel J. Layton to replace him. Having been elected attorney general the previous November and having served in office for only six months, Layton resigned from that position to become chief justice. Governor Buck reappointed Josiah O. Wolcott as chancellor, as well as William Watson Harrington and Charles S. Richards as associate justices of the Supreme Court. In addition to these associate justices, Layton's colleagues in the law courts during his tenure as chief justice also included Richard S. Rodney, David J. Reinhardt, and Charles L. Terry. The resident judge of New Castle County, David J. Reinhardt, died in 1935 after two years of service and was replaced Frank L. Speakman.

During Layton's 12 years as chief justice he wrote 221 of the 511 opinions produced by Delaware's law courts, including 49 of the 106 opinions issued by the Supreme Court. One of Layton's landmark decisions was Guth v. Loft in 1939. In this case Layton defined the relationship between corporate opportunities and the duty of loyalty for Delaware corporations. It was notable in its deviation from the 200 year precedent from Keech v. Sandford that a fiduciary should leave open no possibility of conflict of interest between his private dealings and the job he is entrusted to do. Another of Layton's landmark decisions was Bovay v. H.M. Byllesby & Co. in 1944, which reversed the chancellor's previous dismissal of a suit for an accounting and finding the complaint to state a claim for fraud and unfair dealing against corporate officers and directors for breach of trust, not "mere torts."

As William Prickett, Sr. stated at the proceedings in memory of Chief Justice Layton:

"The Chief Justice wrote English, not a jargon of legalese. No "saids", "to-wits", "hereinaboves", or "aforementioneds" appear in any of his opinions. His language was striking in its clarity and in its picturesqueness."

Unquestionably, Chief Justice Layton was a brilliant judge with a genius for defining fundamental concepts in corporate law. But, unfortunately his aggressive domination of an oral argument frequently silenced even his strong-willed colleagues. Worse still, Layton's air of apparent hostility extended to the lawyers arguing before him, whom he would repeatedly challenge combatively. Judge Collins J. Seitz recalls: "It's an old story in the law heard everywhere about the judge who kept interrupting the lawyer who was arguing his case. Finally, the lawyer got irritated, and said, 'Your Honor, I don’t mind your interrupting me, but I hope you win it for me!"'

== Failed renomination ==
Indeed, as an eminent lawyer remembers, Chief Justice Layton seemed to feel the "need to destroy you if he didn't agree with you." As a consequence, and despite his achievements, Layton failed to be reappointed in 1945 in one of the most painful episodes in Delaware judicial history.

Governor Walter W. Bacon, a Republican, nominated Layton and Judge Charles S. Richards, both well-known Republicans, to succeed themselves as chief justice and associate justice respectively, but the Delaware Senate, a majority of whom were also Republicans, twice rejected both nominees. It was generally said that the opposition to Layton was mounted by Hugh M. Morris, a former United States District Court judge but then a practicing attorney in Wilmington, and joined in by certain Sussex County lawyers who thought they had suffered too long under Layton's wrath in the courtroom. In a compromise arrangement, the Governor of Delaware withdrew Layton's name and nominated Judge Richards to be the new chief justice. He was confirmed. The governor then appointed James B. Carey of Georgetown to be the resident judge for Sussex County, succeeding Judge Richards.

== Aftermath ==
But the political and judicial fallout of Layton's failed renomination continued. In 1946 the term of Judge Richard S. Rodney ended. Having completed twenty-four years of service as Judge of the Superior Court and as an associate justice of the Supreme Court, Rodney was universally acknowledged to be one of the most respected and loved judges in Delaware history. Governor Bacon then took his revenge for the Senate's rejection of Layton, making Rodney the victim. Bacon let it be known that, notwithstanding the fact that the constitution required the appointment of a Democrat, under no circumstances would he reappoint Democrat Rodney. In January 1946 Governor Bacon nominated Vice-Chancellor George Burton Pearson, Jr. to fill the vacancy on the Supreme Court created by the expiration of Judge Rodney's term of office. Pearson, a close friend and admirer of Judge Rodney, had supported his candidacy for reappointment and, in the end, he accepted the governor's offer only when it became certain that Judge Rodney would not be reappointed.

Judge Rodney returned briefly to private practice before receiving an appointment to the United States District Court for the District of Delaware in 1946. He remained on that court until his death in 1963 and never failed to serve with wisdom and grace.

While the years Layton was in the Supreme Court were often difficult and controversial for the bar, the period was one of outstanding growth for Delaware corporate law. The judicial work of Curtis, Wolcott and Layton provided the enduring legal and moral basis for much of what is right with the body of Delaware decisional law. He is interred at St. Paul's Episcopal Church.

Legal offices
Preceded by James Pennewill	Chief Justice of the Delaware Supreme Court; 1933–1945	Succeeded by Charles S. Richards
Preceded by Reuben Satterthwaite Jr.	Attorney General of Delaware; 1933	Succeeded by P. Warren Green
