= Samuel Maxwell Harrington Jr. =

American lawyer, statesman

Samuel Maxwell Harrington Jr. (1840 - 1878) served as a lawyer and statesmen who served as an adjutant general and as Secretary of State of Delaware.

Samuel Maxwell Harrington was his father. Purnell Frederick Harrington was his younger brother. He was the valedictorian for his class at Delaware College.

He served as Secretary of State for Delaware from 1863 to 1865.

He was one of Edwin Wilmer’s defense attorneys.

He is often confused with Samuel Milby Harrington (1882 - 1948), who was his brother Purnell's son.
