= Maffei v. Palkon =

Delaware lawsuit

Maffei et al. v. Palkon et al. (Delaware Supreme Court, No. 125, 2024) is a lawsuit in the Delaware Supreme Court. TripAdvisor shareholders Dennis Palkon and Herbert Williamson sued over an attempted reincorporation of the company to Nevada from Delaware. In February 2025, Justice Karen Valihura decided the case in favor of TripAdvisor.
