= Justice Harrington =

Justice Harrington may refer to:

- Samuel Maxwell Harrington (1803–1865), associate justice of the Delaware Supreme Court
- Theophilus Harrington (1762–1813), associate justice of the Vermont Supreme Court
