= Ralph Bradley =

Ralph Bradley may refer to:

- Ralph Bradley (barrister) (1717–1788), English conveyancing barrister.
- Ralph A. Bradley (1923–2001), Canadian-American statistician and statistics educator

== See also ==
- Bradley Ralph, member of the Kansas House of Representatives
- Brad Ralph, Canadian ice hockey player
