= Nicholas Ridgely =

Nicholas Ridgely may refer to:

- Nicholas Ridgely (born 1694) (1694–1755), justice of the Delaware colonial supreme court
- Nicholas Ridgely (born 1762) (1762–1830), second Chancellor of Delaware
