= Jehu Curtis =

American judge

Justice of the Delaware Supreme Court
- In office 1743–1753
- Succeeded by: William Till

Personal details
- Born: October 19, 1692 Kent County, Delaware
- Died: November 18, 1753 (aged 61)
- Spouse: Mary Brinkle Curtis

Jehu Curtis (October 19, 1692 – November 18, 1753) was an American judge who served as a justice of the Colonial Delaware Supreme Court from 1743 until his death in 1753.

== Biography ==
Born in 1692, Curtis moved to New Castle, Delaware in c. 1743 following an appointment to the Delaware Supreme Court. He became an associate justice in 1745, when Ryves Holt was named the first chief justice. The court that year consisted of three members: Ryves Holt, Curtis, and Nicholas Ridgely. He later became speaker of the Delaware assembly. He served in those two positions until his death in 1753.

An epitaph in memory of Curtis was written by Benjamin Franklin, and said the following:

"To the memory of Jehu Curtis, Esquire, Late Speaker of the Assembly; A Judge of the Supreme Court; Treasurer and Trustee of the Loan Office; who departed this Life, November 18, 1753, aged 61 years." If to be Prudent in Council, Upright in Judgment, Faithful in Trust, Give Value to the Publick Man; If to be Sincere in Friendship, Affectionate to Relations. And Kind to all around him, Make the Private Man amiable, Thy death, O Curtis, As a general Loss, Long shall be lamented."

Political offices
Preceded by ?	Justice of the Delaware Supreme Court; 1743–1753	Succeeded by William Till
