= Ryves Holt =

American judge (1696–1763)

Chief Justice of the Delaware Supreme Court
- In office 1745–1763
- Preceded by: William Till
- Succeeded by: John Vining

Speaker of the Delaware State Council
- In office 1738–1747

High Sheriff of Delaware
- In office 1733–1745

Personal details
- Born: 1696 Philadelphia, Pennsylvania
- Died: May 8, 1763 (aged 67) Lewes, Delaware
- Relatives: Jacob Jones (great-grandson)

Ryves Holt (1696 – May 8, 1763) was an American judge who served as chief justice of the Delaware Supreme Court from 1745 to 1763.

== Biography ==
Born in 1696, Holt, a resident of Philadelphia, was involved in trade with the West Indies before being appointed as naval officer of Lewes, Delaware. He arrived at Lewis in 1721, and held numerous offices in the following years. He was named high sheriff of Delaware in 1727, the same time he was serving as Collector of Public Levy for Lewes and Rehoboth, and Indian River Hundreds. He was named Overseer of the Highways for Lewes and Rehoboth in 1728, and also served as Justice of the Peace. For twelve years, starting in 1733, he occupied the important post of King's Attorney for Sussex county, was for two years, at least, Clerk and Prothonotary of the Courts, and served nine years, from 1738 to 1747, as Speaker of the State Council. He was commissioned by King George II as Chief Justice of the Delaware Supreme Court in 1745. Holt was the first chief justice of the court, as previously people would be commissioned in the justice role only, without any designation of chief. The court that year consisted of three members: Holt, Jehu Curtis, and Nicholas Ridgely. He served in that position until his death in 1763, and was succeeded by John Vining. A tablet made in his honor was given by the Delaware judiciary to St. Peter's Episcopal Church and was unveiled in 1913.

A 1915 article in The Morning Post said:

Records and remnants of the past show that Ryves Holt was deemed a man of sterling patriotism and a devout Christian. The men of his day and generation held him in more respect because he could fill several offices at once.

== Personal life ==
Coat of Arms of Ryves Holt

His home, which he purchased in 1723, is believed to be the oldest surviving house in the state of Delaware.

His great-grandson Jacob Jones was a United States Navy officer and war hero during the War of 1812.

Political offices
Preceded by William Till	Justice of the Delaware Supreme Court; 1745–1763	Succeeded by John Vining
