= Abigail LeGrow =

American judge

Justice of the Delaware Supreme Court
- Incumbent
- Assumed office May 11, 2023
- Appointed by: John Carney
- Preceded by: James T. Vaughn Jr.

Personal details
- Born: 1979 (age 46–47)
- Party: Democratic
- Spouse: Brian LeGrow
- Education: Susquehanna University (BA); Pennsylvania State University (JD)

Abigail LeGrow (born 1979) is an American state court judge from Delaware who is serving as a justice of the Delaware Supreme Court.

== Education ==
LeGrow received a Bachelor of Arts in political science from Susquehanna University in 2001 and graduated Valedictorian with a Juris Doctor from Penn State Dickinson Law in 2004.

== Career ==
After graduating law school, she served as a law clerk to Justice Jack B. Jacobs of the Delaware Supreme Court. She then went on to practice law with law at Potter Anderson & Corroon LLP, where she specialized in corporate and commercial litigation. In 2011, She was appointed by Chancellor Leo E. Strine Jr. as a Master in Chancery of the Delaware Court of Chancery. From 2016 to 2023, she served as a judge of the Delaware Superior Court after being appointed by Governor Jack Markell.

=== Delaware Supreme Court ===
On April 13, 2023, Governor John Carney nominated LeGrow to serve as a justice of the Delaware Supreme Court, to the seat vacated by Justice James T. Vaughn Jr. who retired on May 1, 2023.

On May 3, 2023, the Delaware Senate confirmed her by a 15–3–3 vote. Republicans opposed her because no one represented Kent County. She was sworn in on May 11, 2023.

== Personal life ==
She is married to Brian LeGrow, who, at the time of her appointment to the chancery, was an associate with the Law Offices of Vincent B. Mancini & Associates.

Legal offices
Preceded by James T. Vaughn Jr.	Justice of the Delaware Supreme Court; 2023–present	Incumbent
