= Caleb R. Layton =

American politician (1851–1930)

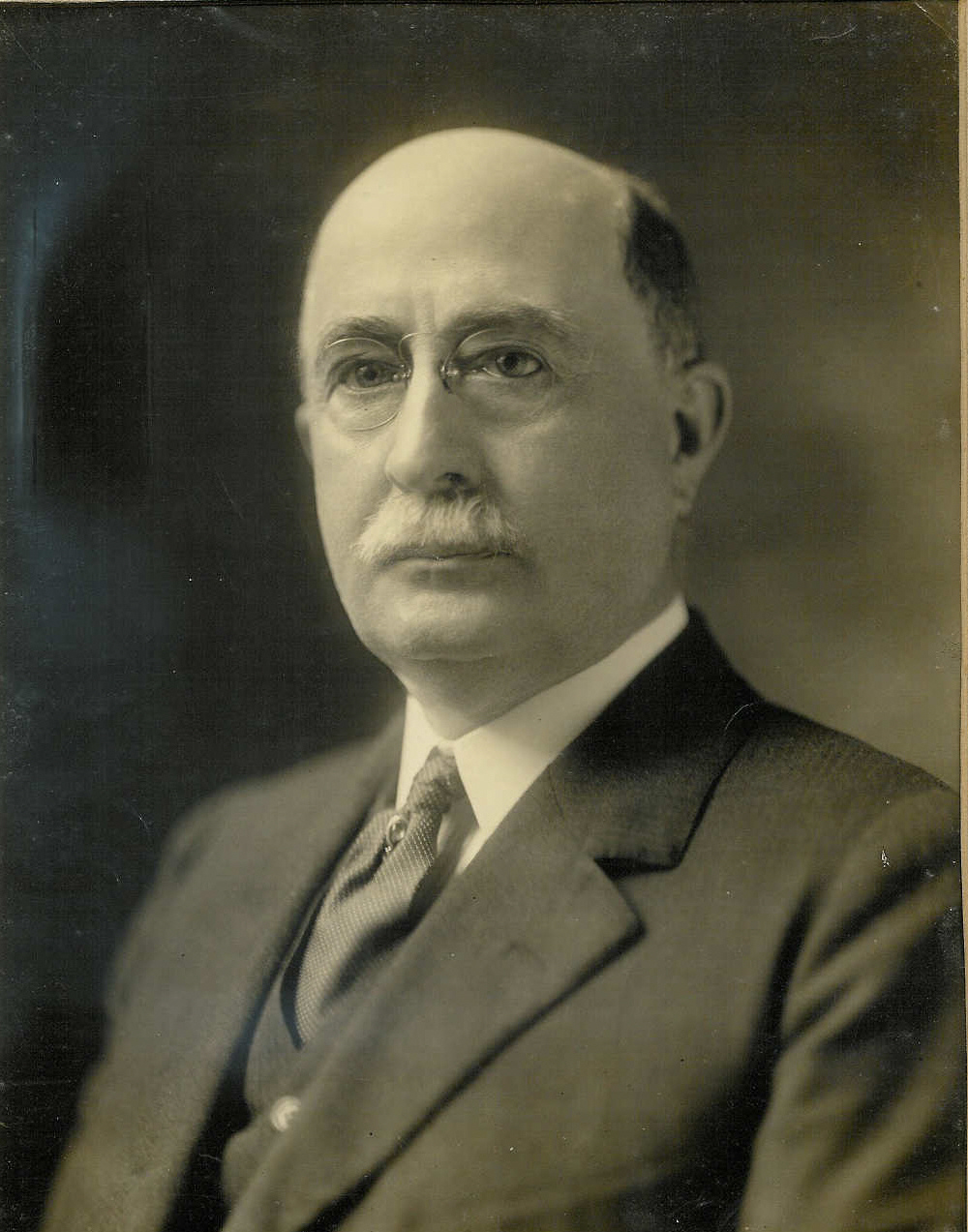

Member of the U.S. House of Representatives from Delaware's at-large district
- In office March 4, 1919 – March 3, 1923
- Preceded by: Albert F. Polk
- Succeeded by: William H. Boyce

Personal details
- Born: September 8, 1851 Frankford, Delaware, U.S.
- Died: November 11, 1930 (aged 79) Georgetown, Delaware, U.S.
- Party: Republican
- Spouse: Anna E. Sipple
- Education: Amherst College; University of Pennsylvania Medical School
- Profession: Physician

Caleb Rodney Layton (September 8, 1851 – November 11, 1930) was an American physician and politician from Georgetown, in Sussex County, Delaware. He was a member of the Republican Party, and served two terms as U.S. Representative from Delaware.

== Early life and family ==
Layton was born at Long Farm, near Frankford, Delaware, the son of Samuel Henry Layton and Elizabeth Long Layton. He was named for his great-grandfather, the Delaware governor Caleb Rodney, and was the grandson of Delaware, congressman, and Secretary of State of Delaware Caleb Sipple Layton. His father was a farmer who had served as Sheriff, Justice of the Peace, and Clerk of the Court of Sussex County. Caleb Layton attended Georgetown Academy and Amherst College in Massachusetts, graduating in 1873. Subsequently he attended the medical school at the University of Pennsylvania in Philadelphia and received his degree in 1876. In 1906 he married Anna Elizabeth Sipple and they had three children: Rachel Sipple Layton, Daniel John Layton, and Caleb Sipple Layton.

== Professional and political career ==
Returning to Sussex County, Layton settled in Georgetown and began the practice of medicine. His first position in the political sphere was as the Secretary of the Republican County Committee, which he held from 1876 to 1888. He was Chairman of the Union (Addicks) Republican Party County Committee from 1896 to 1901 and also served as one of Delaware's ten delegates to the Republican National Conventions in the years 1896, 1900 and 1904. Meanwhile, from 1897 until 1905, he was editor of the Union Republican, a Georgetown newspaper.

Withdrawing completely from his medical practice, Layton was appointed Delaware Secretary of State in 1901, and served until 1905. For the next four years he was appointed as an auditor for the U.S. State Department in Washington, D.C. From 1912 until 1918 he was a member of the Progressive Republican Party State committee.

Layton was elected to the U.S. House of Representatives in 1918, defeating incumbent Democratic U.S. Representative Albert F. Polk. He won election again in 1920, this time defeating Democrat James R. Clements. During these terms, he served in the Republican majority in the 66th and 67th congresses. Seeking reelection in 1922, he lost to Democrat William H. Boyce, a retired judge from Georgetown. Layton served two terms, from March 4, 1919, until March 3, 1923, during the administrations of U.S. presidents Woodrow Wilson and Warren G. Harding. He was voted out of office due to his voting against the Dyer Anti-Lynching Bill. Alice Dunbar Nelson, an African-American political activist and founder of the Anti-Lynching Crusaders, assisted 12,000 new voters who supported the bill to register in Delaware. Layton ultimately lost the election by 7000 votes, which was equal to the number of black voters who voted for his opponent in protest.

== Death and legacy ==
Layton then resumed the practice of medicine in Georgetown, Delaware. He died there and is buried in the St. Paul's Episcopal Churchyard at Georgetown. His son, Daniel J. Layton, later became Attorney General of Delaware and then Chief Justice of the Delaware Supreme Court.

== Almanac ==
Elections are held the first Tuesday after November 1. U.S. Representatives took office March 4 and have a two-year term.

Public offices
Office	Type	Location	Began office	Ended office	Notes
Secretary of State	Executive	Dover	January 15, 1901	January 17, 1905	Delaware
U.S. Representative	Legislature	Washington	March 4, 1919	March 3, 1921	
U.S. Representative	Legislature	Washington	March 4, 1921	March 3, 1923	

United States congressional service
Dates	Congress	Chamber	Majority	President	Committees	Class/District
1919–1921	66th	U.S. House	Republican	Woodrow Wilson		at-large
1921–1923	67th	U.S. House	Republican	Warren G. Harding		at-large

Election results
Year	Office	Subject	Party	Votes	%	Opponent	Party	Votes	%
1918	U.S. Representative	Caleb R. Layton	Republican	21,226	51%	Albert F. Polk	Democratic	19,652	48%
1920	U.S. Representative	Caleb R. Layton	Republican	52,145	54%	James R. Clements	Democratic	40,206	43%
1922	U.S. Representative	Caleb R. Layton	Republican	32,577	45%	William H. Boyce	Democratic	39,126	54%

== Places with more information ==
- Delaware Historical Society; website; 505 North Market Street, Wilmington, Delaware 19801; (302) 655-7161.
- University of Delaware; Library website; 181 South College Avenue, Newark, Delaware 19717; (302) 831-2965.
- Newark Free Library 750 Library Ave., Newark, Delaware (302) 731-7550.

U.S. House of Representatives
Preceded by Albert F. Polk	Member of the U.S. House of Representatives from Delaware's at-large congressional district 1919–1923	Succeeded by William H. Boyce
