= Eden Hill (Dover, Delaware) =

Historic house in Delaware, United States

- U.S. National Register of Historic Places
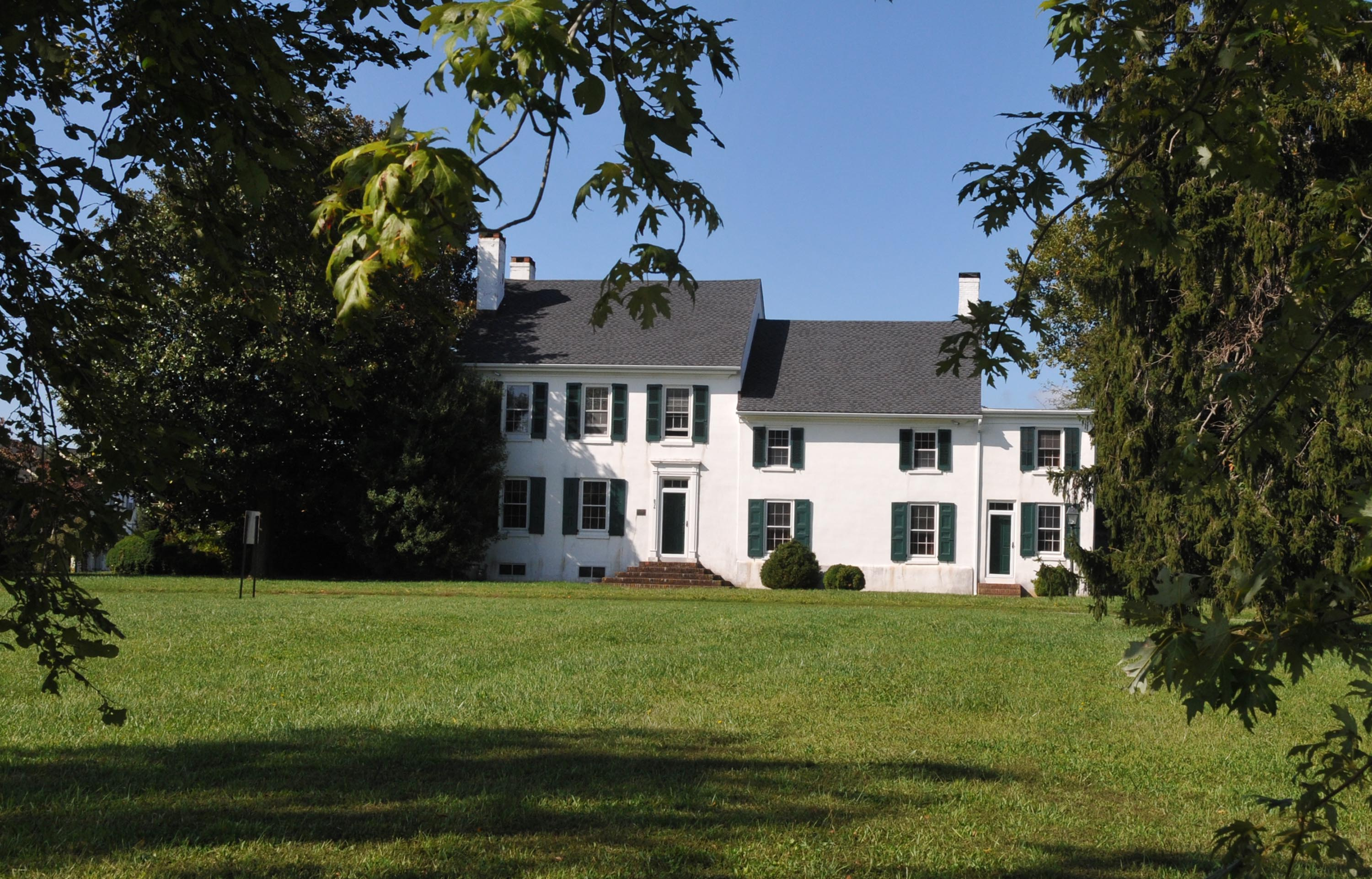
- Eden Hill, September 2012

- Location within Delaware Location within the United States
- Location: W end of Water St., Dover, Delaware
- Coordinates: 39°9′5″N 75°32′13″W
- Area: 0.5 acres (0.20 ha)
- Built: 1749
- Built by: Ridgely, Nicholas
- NRHP reference No.: 73000487
- Added to NRHP: May 8, 1973

Eden Hill is a historic home located at Dover, Kent County, Delaware, built by Delaware Colonial Supreme Court Justice Nicholas Ridgely in 1749. The house was built in two sections; a double-pile, side-hall three bay structure to the south, and a lower two bay section of two rooms to the north. The stuccoed dwelling has a gable roof on both sections. It was the home of the prominent Ridgely family, who purchased the property in 1748.

It was added to the National Register of Historic Places in 1973, and was later acquired by the Delaware Department of Transportation, and later still renovated for use by the state supreme court, being occupied in the early 2010s by Ridgely's descendant, Delaware Supreme Court justice Henry du Pont Ridgely.
