= Berkeley Codd =

American judge

Justice of the Delaware Supreme Court
- In office 1710 – after 1723

Personal details
- Born: c. 1671 Virginia
- Died: 1740

Berkeley Codd, also spelled Barclay or Berkley (c. 1671 – 1740) was a colonial British judge who served as a justice on the Colonial Delaware Supreme Court from 1710 until at least 1723.

Born near the Potomac River in Virginia, c. 1671, to the former Ann Parrott Fox and her second husband, Colonel St. Leger Codd, who had been educated as a lawyer in London before emigrating to Virginia where he became responsible for protecting the Potomac River area from military attack, and also operated a plantation, speculated in real estate and would serve in the Virginia House of Burgesses. His mother died when he was a child. His father remarried, to the politically well-connected Ann Bennett Bland, widow of the former speaker of the Virginia House of Burgesses Theodorick Bland of Westover and daughter of Richard Bennett who sat on the Virginia Governor's Council. When this boy was a teenager in 1687, his father moved the family moved to Maryland to avoid creditors and problems with the Bland estate. His father, who had been educated in the Inns of Court in London, would serve in both houses of the Maryland General Assembly before his death in 1707.

Berkeley Codd inherited land and enslaved Blacks from his father in Delaware as well as land in Lancaster County, Virginia. Berkeley Codd married a woman named Mary and resided in Cedar Creek Hundred, now in Sussex County, Delaware. He was appointed as a justice of the Delaware Supreme Court on April 11, 1710, and served in that position until at least 1723. He died in 1740.
