= Thomas L. Ambro =

American judge (born 1949)

Thomas Ambro
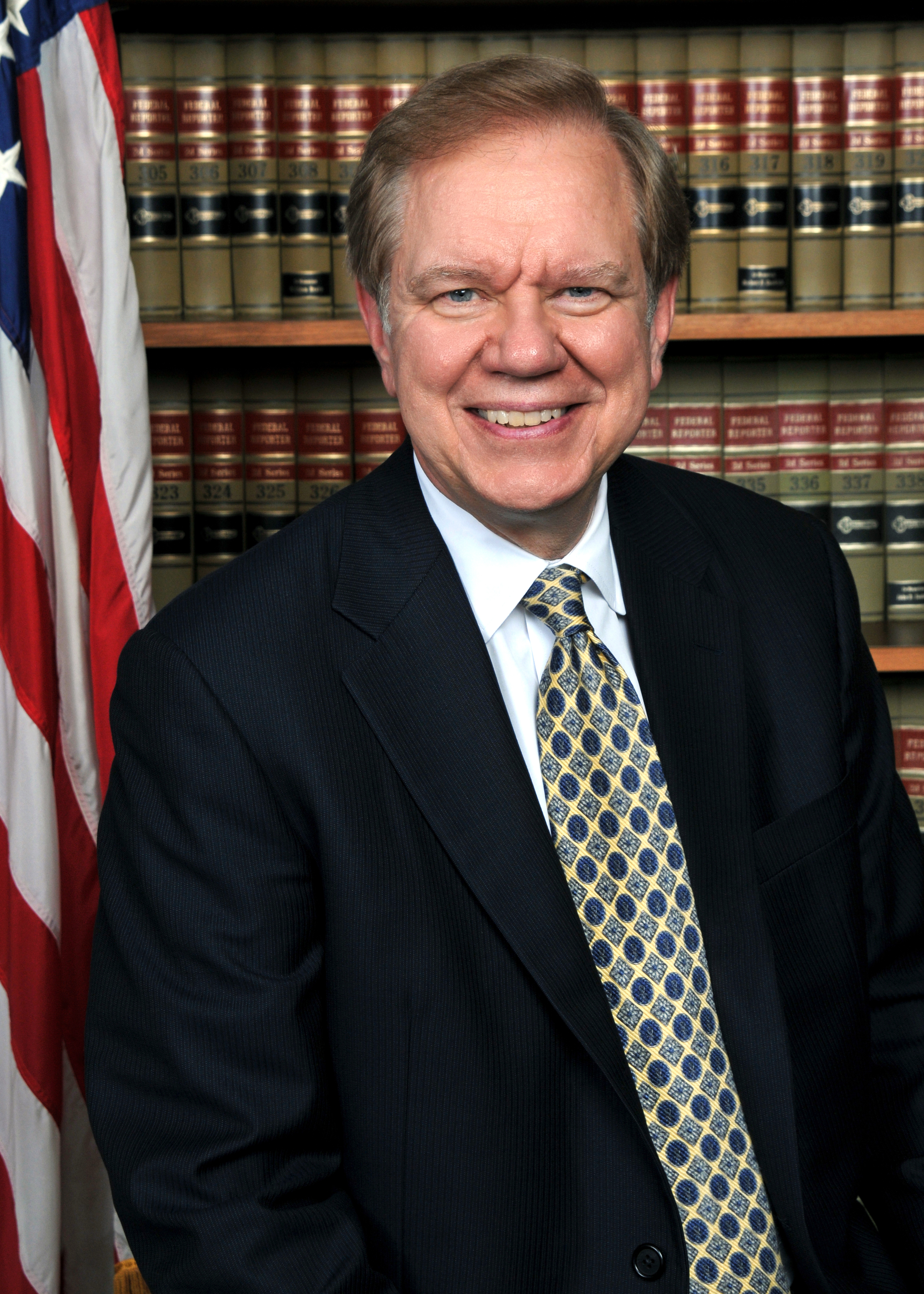

Senior Judge of the United States Court of Appeals for the Third Circuit
- Incumbent
- Assumed office February 6, 2023

Judge of the United States Court of Appeals for the Third Circuit
- In office February 16, 2000 – February 6, 2023
- Appointed by: Bill Clinton
- Preceded by: Walter King Stapleton
- Succeeded by: Tamika Montgomery-Reeves

Personal details
- Born: Thomas Lee Ambro; December 27, 1949 (age 75); Cambridge, Ohio, U.S.
- Education: Georgetown University (BA, JD)

Thomas Lee Ambro (born December 27, 1949) is a Senior United States circuit judge of the United States Court of Appeals for the Third Circuit.

== Education and legal career ==
Ambro received his Bachelor of Arts degree in 1971 from Georgetown University and his Juris Doctor in 1975 from Georgetown University Law Center. After law school, he clerked for Chief Justice Daniel L. Herrmann of the Supreme Court of Delaware.

Following his clerkship, he was in private practice in Wilmington, Delaware from 1976 to 2000 at the law firm of Richards, Layton & Finger. There he was a force behind Delaware's rise as a preferred venue for large Chapter 11 bankruptcy cases. Immediately prior to being elevated to the bench, he headed the bankruptcy practice at Richards Layton.

Ambro is a past Chair of the Section of Business Law of the American Bar Association and past Editor of The Business Lawyer. For 20 years, he chaired the Committee on the Uniform Commercial Code for the Commercial Law Section of the Delaware State Bar Association. He is also a member of the Board of Trustees of the American Inns of Court, the American Law Institute, and the National Bankruptcy Conference.

Ambro serves as an adjunct professor at his alma mater, Georgetown University, where he teaches a course on public speaking to undergraduate students. The Thomas L. Ambro Fellowship, awarded to support a summer internship with the United States Bankruptcy Court for the District of Delaware, is named in his honor.

== Federal judicial service ==
Ambro was nominated to the United States Court of Appeals for the Third Circuit by President Bill Clinton on September 29, 1999, to fill a seat vacated by Judge Walter K. Stapleton, who assumed senior status on June 2, 1999. He was confirmed by the United States Senate on February 10, 2000 by a 96–2 vote. He received his commission on February 16, 2000. He announced his intent to assume senior status upon confirmation of a successor on December 15, 2021. He assumed senior status on February 6, 2023.

== Notable opinions ==
His notable majority opinions includes:

- Holland v. Rosen, 2018 WL 3340930 (3d Cir. 2018): A New Jersey criminal defendant sought to enjoin the New Jersey Criminal Justice Reform Act's subordination of cash bail and commercial bonds to non-monetary conditions of release, arguing that by doing so the Act violates the Eighth, Fourteenth, and Fourth Amendments of the United States Constitution. The Court affirmed the District Court's refusal to issue the injunction because the constitutional amendments do not provide a right to those forms of monetary bail.
- Fields v. City of Philadelphia, 862 F.3d 353 (3d Cir. 2017): The majority held that the First Amendment to the United States Constitution protected a right to record video of the police but nevertheless granted qualified immunity to officers who had prevented bystanders from doing so, prompting a partial dissent from Judge Richard Lowell Nygaard.
- Binderup v. Att'y Gen., 836 F.3d 336 (3d Cir. 2016) (en banc), cert. denied sub nom. Sessions v. Binderup, 137 S. Ct. 2323 (2017): The majority opinion, in a fragmented set of opinions, held, in a consolidated case, that (1) Appellants may make an as-applied Second Amendment challenge to a federal statute making it unlawful to possess a firearm, inter alia, if convicted in a state court of a misdemeanor punishable by imprisonment greater than two years, and (2) in determining that challenge, a court in the Third Circuit must continue to follow the analytical framework of its earlier decision in United States v. Marzzarella, 614 F.3d 85 (3d Cir. 2010).
- In re National Football League Players Concussion Injury Litigation, 821 F.3d 410 (3d Cir. 2016): The Court upheld a settlement designed to compensate former NFL players who faced lasting medical issues presumed to be caused by concussions.
- Hassan v. City of New York, 804 F.3d 277 (3d Cir. 2015): Muslims claiming to have been subject to a once-secret mass surveillance program run by the NYPD in the aftermath of September 11 had standing to bring an equal protection lawsuit. The plaintiffs alleged that they were singled out merely because of their religion and not based on any suspicion of wrongdoing. Judge Ambro wrote: "What occurs here in one guise is not new. We have been down similar roads before. Jewish–Americans during the Red Scare, African–Americans during the Civil Rights Movement, and Japanese–Americans during World War II are examples that readily spring to mind. We are left to wonder why we cannot see with foresight what we see so clearly with hindsight—that '[l]oyalty is a matter of the heart and mind[,] not race, creed, or color.'"
- FTC v. Wyndham Worldwide Corp., 799 F.3d 236 (3d Cir. 2015): The Federal Trade Commission's authority to regulate "unfair or deceptive acts or practices in or affecting commerce" includes the power to police corporate cyber security practices.
- In re Revel AC, Inc., 802 F.3d 558 (3d Cir. 2015): In this much-cited opinion in a bankruptcy case, the Court clarified the standards for getting a stay pending an appeal. In a later opinion also authored by Judge Ambro, Reilly v. City of Harrisburg, 858 F.3d 173 (3d Cir. 2017), the Court applied the same standards for preliminary injunctions.
- In re Tribune Media Co., 799 F.3d 272 (3d Cir. 2015): A unanimous panel held that a portion of a bankruptcy appeal had become equitably moot. Judge Ambro wrote the majority opinion and also authored a concurring opinion, which Judge Vanaskie joined. In the concurrence, Judge Ambro responded to an opinion by Judge Krause that called for courts to do away with the equitable mootness doctrine. See In re One2One Communications, LLC, 805 F.3d 428 (3d Cir. 2015) (Krause, J., concurring). Equitable mootness allows appellate courts to forbear, for practical reasons, from deciding an appeal when exercising jurisdiction would undermine the finality and reliability of a consummated reorganization plan. Judge Ambro's concurrence defended the limited use of the doctrine, concluding: "In a very few cases, shutting an appellant out of the courthouse does substantially less harm than locking a debtor inside."
- Dwyer v. Cappell, 762 F.3d 275 (3d Cir. 2014): An attorney challenged New Jersey's Attorney Advertising Guideline 3, which prohibited excerpting judicial opinions in attorney advertisements without displaying the entire opinions. The Court held that Guideline 3, as-applied to the particular attorney, violated the First Amendment.
- United States v. Gunter, 462 F.3d 237 (3d Cir. 2006): The Court held that district courts were required, under United States v. Booker, 543 U.S. 220 (2005), to treat the crack cocaine federal Sentencing Guidelines as advisory, rather than mandatory, and could consider whether the Sentencing Guidelines's differential between crack and cocaine was rational when imposing sentences. It is primarily known as the first appellate court decision after Booker to lay out the three-step process that district courts must use to sentence defendants. First, courts must, as they did before Booker, calculate a defendant's Guidelines sentence. Second, they must formally rule on the motions of both parties and state on the record whether they are granting a departure and, if so, how that departure affects the Guidelines calculation. Finally, they must exercise their discretion by considering statutory sentencing factors, even if the sentence they ultimately impose does not vary from the Guidelines range.
- In re Owens Corning, 419 F.3d 195 (3d Cir. 2005): The Court set out the circumstances under which a bankruptcy court may substantively consolidate affiliated (but legally separate) entities for purposes of bankruptcy.
- Forum for Academic & Institutional Rights v. Rumsfeld, 390 F.3d 219 (3d Cir. 2004): FAIR, an association of law schools and law faculty, challenged the Solomon Amendment, which requires the Department of Defense to deny federal funding to institutions of higher education that bar military recruiters. The schools argued that forcing them to allow military recruiters on campus, in violation of their policies against recruitment by employers who discriminate on the basis of sexual orientation, impeded their First Amendment rights. The Third Circuit entered a preliminary injunction against enforcement of the Solomon Amendment. The Supreme Court reversed in FAIR v. Rumsfeld.
- Prometheus Radio Project v. FCC, 373 F.3d 372 (3d Cir. 2004): The Court examined a host of challenges to the Federal Communications Commission's media ownership rules, which set limits on the amount of consolidation that is permitted in the broadcast industry. The opinion upheld many of the Commission's decisions but sent others back for further review. For instance, it concluded that the FCC did not sufficiently justify its chosen limits for cross-ownership in local markets or its decision to repeal the Failed Station Solicitation Rule. The case has been back in front of the Third Circuit twice since then, and Judge Ambro wrote the majority opinion each time. See Prometheus Radio Project v. FCC, 652 F.3d 431 (3d Cir. 2011) (Prometheus II); Prometheus Radio Project v. FCC, 824 F.3d 33 (3d Cir. 2016) (Prometheus III).
- Tenafly Eruv Ass'n, Inc. v. Borough of Tenafly, 309 F.3d 144 (3d Cir. 2002): Plaintiffs were entitled to a preliminary injunction because they were likely to prevail on their First Amendment Free Exercise claim, which alleged that the Borough of Tenafly singled out Orthodox Jews when enforcing an ordinance.

His notable dissenting opinions include:

- Abu-Jamal v. Horn, 520 F.3d 272 (3d Cir. 2008). Mumia Abu-Jamal is an American prisoner convicted for the 1981 murder of Philadelphia police officer Daniel Faulkner. His original sentence of death was commuted to life imprisonment, but he remains arguably "the world's best known death-row inmate." In this case the Third Circuit considered several issues relating to Abu-Jamal's conviction and sentencing, notably whether the Commonwealth's use of peremptory challenges violated Abu-Jamal's constitutional rights under Batson v. Kentucky, 476 U.S. 79 (1986). The majority held that Abu-Jamal's Batson claim was barred because he had failed to contemporaneously object to the discriminatory use of peremptory challenges during jury selection. Judge Ambro dissented, disagreeing with the majority's contemporaneous objection rule and arguing that Abu-Jamal had established a prima facie case of purposeful discrimination.
- In re Philadelphia Newspapers, 599 F.3d 298 (3d Cir. 2010): The majority held that, under the plain meaning of 11 U.S.C. § 1123, a debtor (here the owner of the Philadelphia Inquirer) can conduct a sale of its assets under a plan of reorganization without allowing secured lenders to credit bid. Judge Ambro dissented, arguing that the majority's interpretation rendered a subsection of the statute superfluous and would lead to the undervaluation of collateral property. Judge Ambro's views were validated in 2012 when the Supreme Court rejected the reasoning behind the majority opinion in Philadelphia Newspapers and ruled that, under normal circumstances, a secured creditor's right to credit bid cannot be taken away by a plan's bidding structure. See RadLAX Gateway Hotel, LLC v. Amalgamated Bank, 132 S. Ct. 2065 (2012).

== Selected publications ==
- "Third Party Legal Opinions," in Asset Based Financing: A Transactional Guide (Matthew Bender 1990)
- "The First Amendment, the Courts, and 'Picking Winners,'" 87 U. Wash. L. Rev. 397 (2012) (with Paul J. Safier)
- "Citing Legal Articles in Judicial Opinions: A Sympathetic Antipathy," 80 Am. Bankr. L.J. 547 (2006)
- "Some Thoughts on the Economics of Legal Opinions," 1989 Colum. Bus. L. Rev. 307 (1989) (with J. Truman Bidwell, Jr.)

== Sources ==
Legal offices
Preceded by Walter King Stapleton	Judge of the United States Court of Appeals for the Third Circuit; 2000–2023	Succeeded by Tamika Montgomery-Reeves
