= James Pennewill =

American judge (1854–1935)

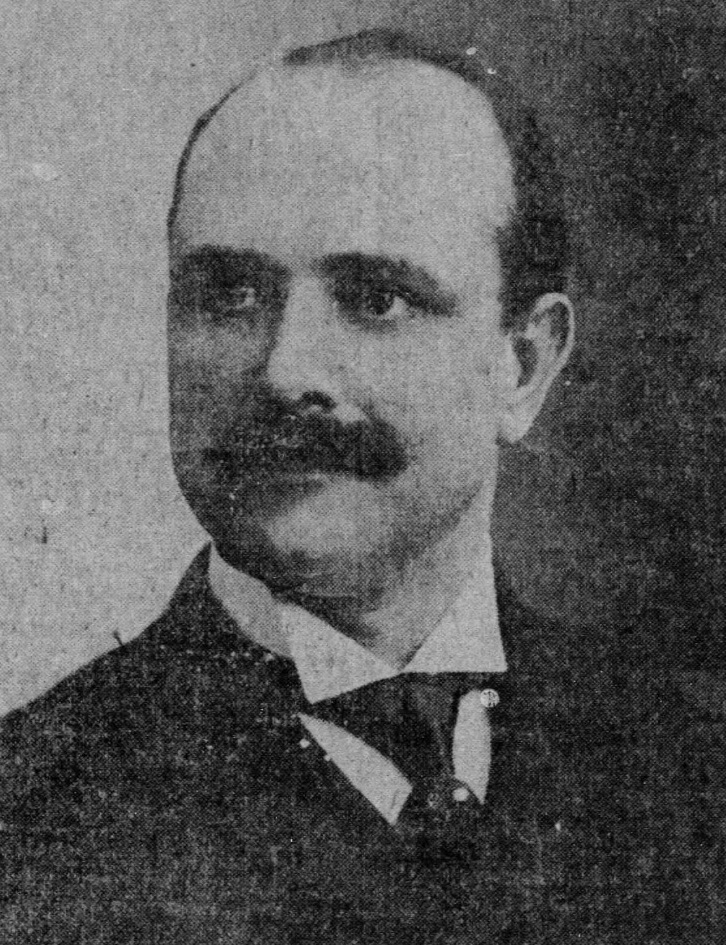
James Pennewill as chief justice in 1909

James C. Pennewill (June 16, 1854 – December 29, 1935) was a justice of the Delaware Supreme Court, serving as chief justice from 1909 to 1933.

== Early life, education, and career ==
Born in Greenwood, Delaware, to Simeon and Anna (Curry) Pennewill, he attended public and private schools in Greenwood, and prepared for college at Reynolds Academy, in Wilmington, Delaware. He graduated from Princeton University in 1875, and moved to Dover, Delaware, to study law in the office of Nathaniel B. Smithers. Pennewill gained admission to the bar in 1878, and built a large practice in Dover, including among his clients the Pennsylvania Railroad Company. He was also active in politics, chairing the Kent County Republican Committee, and later the statewide Republican Committee.

== Judicial service ==
On June 14, 1897, Governor Ebe W. Tunnell appointed Pennewill to a seat as an associate justice of the Delaware Supreme Court and Resident Judge of Kent County. Tunnell, a Democrat, named the Republican Pennewill to the court pursuant to a state law requiring that no more than three of the five judges on the court could be of the same political party. On June 15, 1909, Governor Simeon S. Pennewill, who was his brother, elevated Pennewill to chief justice, in which position he served until approaching the mandatory age of retirement in 1933. In January 1907, he was offered an appointment to the United States Senate, but declined it.

== Personal life ==
On December 5, 1888, Pennewill married Alice Hazel. They had no children.

He died at his home in Wilmington, Delaware, following a heart attack while having breakfast, at the age of 81.

Political offices
Preceded by Charles B. Lore	Chief Justice of the Delaware Supreme Court; 1909–1933	Succeeded by Daniel J. Layton
Preceded by Charles M. Cullen	Justice of the Delaware Supreme Court; 1897–1933	Succeeded by Daniel J. Layton
