= Randy J. Holland =

American judge (1947–2022)

Justice of the Delaware Supreme Court
- In office 1986 – March 2017
- Appointed by: Mike Castle
- Succeeded by: Gary Traynor

Personal details
- Born: January 27, 1947 Elizabeth, New Jersey, US
- Died: March 15, 2022 (aged 75)
- Education: Swarthmore College (BA) University of Pennsylvania; University of Virginia (LLM)

Randy James Holland (January 27, 1947 – March 15, 2022) was a justice of the Delaware Supreme Court. He was appointed to that office in 1986 and was the youngest person to serve on the Delaware Supreme Court. He retired from the Court in 2017. His seat was taken by Justice Gary Traynor.

== Early life and education ==
Randy James Holland was born on January 27, 1947, in Elizabeth, New Jersey, the oldest child of James Holland and Virginia Holland. Shortly thereafter, the family moved to Milford, Delaware. Holland attended Milford High School, where he was quarterback and captain of the football team and a catcher on the baseball team. While in high school, he met his future wife, Ilona E. Holland.

Holland attended Swarthmore College in Swarthmore, Pennsylvania. He graduated from Swarthmore in 1969 with a Bachelor of Arts degree in economics. He graduated from the University of Pennsylvania Law School, cum laude, and he received the Loughlin Award for legal ethics. Holland received a Master of Laws in the Judicial Process from the University of Virginia Law School.

== Legal career ==
Prior to his appointment and confirmation to the Delaware Supreme Court in 1986, he was a partner at Morris, Nichols, Arsht & Tunnell in Georgetown, Delaware. Holland was appointed to the court in 1986 by Governor Mike Castle, making him the youngest person to serve as a Delaware Supreme Court justice. In 2009, he became the longest-serving justice in Delaware history. Two years later, Holland was reappointed by former Governor Jack A. Markell and was unanimously confirmed by the Delaware Senate for an unprecedented third 12-year term. While on the court, Holland wrote more than 700 reported opinions, which include many seminal corporate law decisions.

Holland announced in February 2017 that he would retire at the end of March 2017. His final term was set to expire on March 23, 2023. After retiring from the Delaware Supreme Court, Holland joined the law firm, Wilson Sonsini Goodrich & Rosati, where he was Senior counsel in the Wilmington, Delaware office.

During his legal career Holland was a member of many different organizations such as;

- National President and Trustee of the American Inns of Court Foundation
- Co-chair National Advisory Committee to the American Judicature Society's Center for Judicial Ethics
- American Law Institute
- American Judicature Society Board of Directors
- Delaware State Bar Association
- American Bar Association
  - Appellate Judges Conference Executive Committee
  - National Joint Committee Chair on Lawyer Regulation.
  - Presidential Commission on Fair and Impartial Courts
  - Standing Committee on Client Protection
  - Judicial Division's Ethics and Professionalism Committee

== Books and publications ==
Holland wrote, co-authored, or edited the following books:

- Magna Carta: Muse & Mentor (2014)
- Delaware's Destiny Determined By Lewes (2013)
- Delaware Corporation Law, Selected Cases (2011 Chinese (Taiwan) only)
- State Constitutional Law, the Modern Experience, co-author (West 2010)
- Middle Temple Lawyers and the American Revolution, co-author (Thomson-West 2007)
- Appellate Practice and Procedure, co-author (West 2005)
- The Delaware Constitution: A Reference Guide (Greenwood Press 2002
- Delaware Supreme Court: Golden Anniversary (2001), co-editor
- The Delaware Constitution of 1897 - The First One Hundred Years, co-editor (1997).

He has also published several law review articles, primarily dealing with judicial ethics and legal history.

In 2009, Holland co-authored a law school casebook from the perspective of all 50 states entitled State Constitutional Law: The Modern Experience. In 2010, with Holland's encouragement, the Conference of Chief Justices passed a unanimous resolution recommending that all law schools offer courses on state constitutions.

== Namesakes and endowments ==
- The Randy J. Holland Delaware Workers Compensation American Inn of Court
- Randy J. Holland Family Law Endowment: The RJH Endowment Fund was created to honor Justice Holland's legacy and to give meaning to his deeply held belief that access to justice must not be dependent on ability to pay. This Endowment Fund secured funding in perpetuity for an attorney at one of the three Combined Campaign for Justice (CCJ) agencies to provide legal services pertaining to family law matters, including domestic violence and abuse and other civil legal problems encountered by indigent families in Delaware. The RJH Endowment Fund has been established at, and is being managed by, the Delaware Community Foundation (DCF).
- Holland Award at the University of Iowa College of Law: The University of Iowa College of Law, where Justice Holland often taught inter-session courses (including, in later years, in the school's London Program), presents an annual award named after the justice to the graduating student who wrote, in the judgment of the faculty, the best paper on a corporate law topic.

== Awards and honors ==
- 1992 Judge of the Year, National Child Support Enforcement Association
- 2003 Herbert Harley Award, American Judicature Society
- 2004 Adjunct Professor Distinguished Service Award, Widener Law School
- 2007 A. Sherwin Christiansen Award, American Inns of Court
- 2009 James Wilson Award, University of Pennsylvania School of Law
- 2011 Dwight D. Opperman Award for Judicial Excellence
- 2012 First State Distinguished Service Award, Delaware State Bar Association
- 2014 Lewis F. Powell, Jr. Award for Professionalism and Ethics, American Inns of Court
- 2017 The Daniel L. Herrmann Professional Conduct Award, Delaware State Bar Association
- 2020 Alumni Award of Merit, University of Pennsylvania School of Law

In 2004, Holland was elected to be an Honorable Master of the Bench by Lincoln's Inn in London.

Chief Justices Rehnquist and Roberts appointed Holland as the state judge member of the Federal Judicial Conference Advisory Committee on Appellate Rules.

== Personal life ==
Holland taught appellate practice for 25 years as an adjunct professor and co-authored a law school casebook entitled Appellate Practice and Procedure. He continued to teach corporate governance classes at several law schools.

Holland was recognized as one of the leading influencers on business ethics in the United States. He traveled internationally to advance corporate governance and ethics, including working with the chief justice of Taiwan and visiting the country to speak on these topics.

After his death was announced in March 2022, many highlighted his legacy and legal work, including the Delaware State Democratic Caucus, Senator Tom Carper, former Chief Justices E. Norman Veasey and Leo E. Strine Jr, and current Chief Justice Collins J Seitz Jr.
