= Charles S. Richards =

American judge (1878–1971)

Charles S. Richards (1878 – October 8, 1971) was chief justice of the Delaware Supreme Court from 1945 to 1951, and president judge of the Delaware Superior Court from then until 1956.

Born in Georgetown, Delaware, Richards studied law at Georgetown University, and gained admission to the bar in Sussex on April 7, 1904.

In 1929, Richards was appointed by Governor C. Douglass Buck to the position of Resident Judge of Sussex County, taking office on June 3, 1929. On August 13, 1945, Governor Walter W. Bacon nominated Richards as chief justice shortly after withdrawing his nomination of Daniel J. Layton for the seat. The nomination of Richards was quickly confirmed. During the course of his service, the court was reconfigured, with Richards becoming the first President Judge of the Superior Court on May 8, 1951.

While serving in the court, Richards "helped in the fight to keep the traditional look in the rebuilding of the Sussex County Courthouse". Richards "was cited as one of six judges who helped build the body of case law in the corporate field". Richards retired from the bench on January 1, 1956.

Richards was hospitalized at Beebe Memorial Hospital in Lewes for a broken hip in September 1971, and died weeks later, after a short illness, at the age of 93.

Political offices
Preceded by Daniel J. Layton	Chief Justice of the Delaware Supreme Court; 1945–1951	Succeeded by Clarence A. Southerland
