= Ralph Bradley (barrister) =

English conveyancing barrister

Ralph Bradley (1717–1788) was an English conveyancing barrister.

== Life ==
Bradley was born on 22 September 1717 at Greatham, County Durham and educated at Durham School. He was a contemporary of James Charles Booth, who has been called the patriarch of modern conveyancing. Bradley was called to the bar at Gray's Inn, and practised at Stockton-on-Tees for half a century. He is said to have managed the concerns of almost the whole of County Durham, and, though a provincial counsel, his opinions were everywhere received with the greatest respect. His drafts, like Booth's, were prolix, but some of them were in later use as precedents in the northern counties.

Bradley died at Stockton-on-Tees on 28 December 1788, and was buried in the parish church of Greatham, where a mural monument was erected to his memory on the north side of the chancel.

== Works ==
Bradley published (London, 1779) An Enquiry into the Nature of Property and Estates as defined by English Law, in which are considered the opinions of Mr. Justice Blackstone and Lord Coke concerning Real Property. There was also published in 1804 in London Practical Points, or Maxims in Conveyancing, drawn from the daily experience of a late eminent conveyancer (Bradley), with critical observations on the various parts of a Deed by J. Ritson. This was a collection of Bradley's notes on points of practice, and the technical minutiae of conveyancing as they were suggested in the course of his professional life. Joseph Ritson had studied under Bradley.

== Legacy ==
Bradley by his will left £40,000 on trust for the purchase of books calculated to promote the interests of religion and virtue in Great Britain and the happiness of mankind. Lord Thurlow, by a decree in chancery, set aside the charitable disposition of Bradley in favour of his next of kin.
