= Judge Booth =

Judge Booth may refer to:

- Fenton Whitlock Booth (1869–1947), judge of the United States Court of Claims
- James Booth (judge) (1914–2000), British circuit judge of Barrow-in-Furness
- Margaret Booth (judge) (1933–2021), British judge of the High Court of Justice of England and Wales
- Wilbur F. Booth (1861–1944), judge of the United States Court of Appeals for the Eighth Circuit

== See also ==
- Justice Booth (disambiguation)
