= John French (judge) =

American judge (1670–1728)

Justice of the Delaware Supreme Court
- In office 1726–1727
- Preceded by: Jasper Yeates
- Succeeded by: David Evans

Personal details
- Born: 1670 Scotland
- Died: October 25, 1728 New Castle, Delaware

John French (1670 – October 25, 1728) was a Scottish-born judge in the Thirteen Colonies who served as a justice of the Colonial Delaware Supreme Court from 1726 to 1727.

== Biography ==
Though his exact date of birth is unknown, French was born about 1670 in Scotland. He emigrated to North America in 1703, settling in the colony of Delaware. Shortly afterwards, French was elected to the position of Delaware high sheriff. When Delaware was given its first separate assembly from Pennsylvania, French was a member of it and later was its speaker. When a militia was requested from Pennsylvania and Delaware, the latter responded and he was given the position of Colonel.

French later became an ambassador between the colony of Delaware and local Native Americans. As sole ambassador, he helped signed a peace treaty in 1719 with the Mingo, Shawnee, Delaware, and Conawage Indians. When there were territory disputes between Delaware and Maryland, French was appointed "Guardian of the Marches of the Province", and negotiated with agents of Lord Baltimore. He also bought four acres of land along the Christiana River, and opened a grist mill, which, with his political positions, helped him become a wealthy individual, according to The Morning News.

In 1717, Sir William Keith was appointed governor, and became good friends with French. Keith gave him positions as register of wills for New Castle County and justice of the peace.

When Patrick Gordon was made a successor to Keith, French was given a position on the Delaware Supreme Court as top justice on July 25, 1726. He was removed one year later, when documents were shown that alleged he made derogatory comments about the Penn Family. He died one year later, on October 25, 1728, in New Castle.

Political offices
Preceded by Jasper Yeates	Justice of the Delaware Supreme Court; 1726–1727	Succeeded by David Evans
