= St. Leger Codd =

Member of the lower house of the Maryland General Assembly for Cecil County, Colony of Maryland
- In office 1692, 1694-1697, 1701-1704

Member of the Virginia House of Burgesses for Northumberland County, Colony of Virginia
- In office 1684 Serving with David Fox
- Preceded by: Edward Dale
- Succeeded by: William Ball

Member of the Virginia House of Burgesses for Northumberland County, Colony of Virginia
- In office 1680-1682 Serving with William Presley
- Preceded by: Isaac Allerton
- Succeeded by: Thomas Brereton

Personal details
- Born: 1636 Pelicans, Kent, England
- Died: 1707 (aged 70–71) Cecil County, Colony of Maryland
- Spouse(s): Anne Parrott Fox (d. ), Anna Bennett Bland
- Children: James Codd, Berkeley Codd, St. Leger Codd Jr.
- Parent(s): William Codd, Mary St. Leger
- Occupation: militia officer, planter, politician

St. Leger Codd (c. 1630-1707) was a militia officer, lawyer, planter and politician in the Colony of Virginia and the Colony of Maryland who sat in the Virginia House of Burgesses and the lower house of the Maryland General Assembly (being nominated by Lord Baltimore but not confirmed by the London Board of Trade for the upper house).

== Early and family life ==
The eldest son of William Codd (d. 1652) of Watringbury Parish in Kent, England and his wife Mary St. Leger. He received a private education appropriate to his class, including attendance at Gray's Inn in London, one of the Inns of Court.

He first married, Anne, the widow of David Fox, who bore sons James Codd and Berkeley Codd but by May 1670 her children by Fox were suing him for the way he was handling their inheritance. She had died by 1679, when Codd married Anna, the widow of Theodorick Bland of Westover, a major planter and politician who had served as speaker of the House of Burgesses. They had a son, also St. Leger Codd. After her death, he married the widow Anne Hynson Wickes, the daughter of Thomas Hynson, a prominent lawyer, planter and officeholder of Kent County, Maryland.

== Virginia career ==
Codd sailed to the Virginia colony after his father's death and began acquiring land. He acquired a plantation near the border between Northumberland and Lancaster Counties on a branch of the Corotoman River. He was directed to establish forts along the Potomac River. In 1678 he paid taxes on 8 tithables in Lancaster County.

By 1671 Codd was a justice of the peace for Northumberland County, but also involved in litigation. He had been sued by his stepchildren in 1670, and successfully sued a Northumberland County man for spreading rumors that Codd abused his indentured servants and was responsible for one or more deaths. He was later sued by Sarah Bland, the widow of John Bland, Theodorick Bland's elder brother and manager of the family's transatlantic business (presumably in financial difficulties because of the tobacco glut and price decline in the 1670s). Although Codd was initially successful in that litigation, it dragged on, in part because in addition to trying to resolve her husband's estate, Sarah Bland also sought resolution for the death of her son Giles Bland, who was executed for his part in Bacon's Rebellion. She had appealed to London, and successor royal governor's were using the case as a means of reducing the power of the Virginia Governor's Council. Codd had other debts, and burgess Christopher Robinson was representing him in litigation in 1685 brought by London-based merchant John Jeffreys, who called for Codd's arrest for failing to obey a court summons. Codd also owed money to Jamestown merchant William Sherwood, Nicholas Spencer, and John Strechley.

In 1680, both Northumberland and Lancaster County voters selected Codd to represent them in the House of Burgesses, and Codd chose to represent Northumberland County. In the next election, he was elected by Lancaster County voters.

== Maryland career ==
In the summer of 1687, Codd's financial problems were so severe, that he fled with his wife and family to Maryland. He settled first at Kent Island.

By 1688, Codd moved his family further north along the coast, to Cecil County, which he represented first in the lower house of the Maryland General Assembly in 1692, then in 1694-1697 and finally in 1701–1704. During the 1694-1697 session, he sat on the Provincial Court, which adjudicated appeals from judicial decisions in lower courts.

== Death and legacy ==
Codd died in Maryland. His son James inherited the family lands in England. Berkeley Codd inherited land in Delaware, and became a justice of the Delaware Supreme Court. His half-brother St. Leger Codd Jr. also became a planter, legislator and judge, representing Kent County in the Maryland General Assembly and adjudicating in the Maryland Provincial Court and several lower courts.
