= Small Wars Manual =

US Marine Corps manual

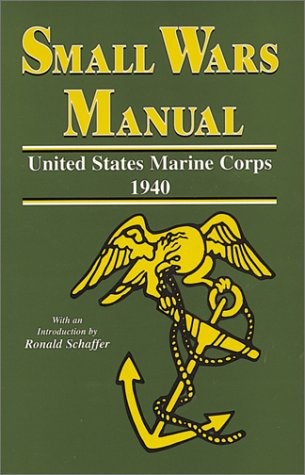
Small Wars Manual cover

The Small Wars Manual is a United States Marine Corps manual on tactics and strategies for engaging in certain types of military operations.

The Marine Corps' role in small wars has a long and complex history. During the early years of the 20th century, the Corps was widely viewed as the nation's overseas police and initial response force. Moreover, the actual execution of these roles were a natural adjunct of the Corps' officially directed mission of sea-based power projection, in turn buttressed by its fundamental expeditionary operational character; i.e., the availability for "sudden and immediate call".

As a result of this "natural fit" and the experience of a series of guerrilla wars and military interventions in Central America and the Caribbean from the late 1890s through the early 1930s, loosely known as the Banana Wars, the Marine Corps began to systematically analyze the character and requirements of operations short of war proper, or "Small Wars". Major Samuel M. Harrington of the Marine Corps Schools delivered a formal report The Strategy and Tactics of Small Wars in 1921. In addition, Major C. J. Miller wrote a 154-page report on the 2nd Marine Brigade's operations in the Dominican Republic titled Diplomacy and Spurs in the Dominican Republic in 1923. Versions of these and other reports were serialized in The Marine Corps Gazette and additional articles on the subject appeared in The Marine Corps Gazette and the Proceedings of the U.S. Naval Institute.

The results of these efforts were encapsulated in the manual Small Wars Operations in 1935. For the 1940 revision, it was renamed The Small Wars Manual (SWM). A classic of military science, based upon experience, not theory, it remains relevant today as the foundation of much current thinking and doctrine. General James Mattis encouraged the troops of the 1st Marine Division to read it in preparation for the Corps's return to the Iraq War as an occupation force.

== Chapters ==
I. Introduction
II. Organization
III. Logistics
IV. Training
V. Initial operations
VI. Infantry patrols
VII. Mounted detachments
VIII. Convoys and convoy escorts
IX. Aviation
X. River operations
XI. Disarmament of population
XII. Armed native organizations
XIII. Military government
XIV. Supervision of elections
XV. Withdrawal

== See also ==
- Charles Edward Callwell
