= Jasper Yeates (colonial judge) =

American judge (1670–1720)

Chief Justice of the Delaware Supreme Court
- In office December 3, 1707 – April 11, 1710
- Preceded by: William Clark
- Succeeded by: John Healey
- In office August 1, 1717 – May 2, 1720
- Preceded by: Richard Birmingham
- Succeeded by: John French

Associate Justice of the Pennsylvania Supreme Court
- In office 1704–1710
- In office 1717 – May 2, 1720

Member of the Pennsylvania Provincial Council
- In office December 25, 1696 – May 2, 1720

Member of the Pennsylvania Provincial Assembly from New Castle County
- In office October 1699 – 1703

Member of the Delaware General Assembly from New Castle County
- In office 1703–?

Personal details
- Born: 1670 Yorkshire, England
- Died: May 2, 1720 New Castle, Delaware
- Spouse: Catharine Sandelands (m. 1690)
- Relatives: Jasper Yeates (grandson)

Jasper Yeates (1670 – May 2, 1720) was an English-born colonial American judge who served as chief justice of the Supreme Court of the Lower Counties of Delaware (now known as the Delaware Supreme Court) from 1707 to 1710 and from 1717 until his death in 1720. He also served on the Supreme Court of Pennsylvania, was chief burgess of Chester, was on the Pennsylvania Provincial Council, served as a New Castle County representative in the Pennsylvania General Assembly, and was speaker of the Delaware General Assembly.

His grandson, also named Jasper Yeates, also served on the Pennsylvania Supreme Court.

== Biography ==
Yeates was born in 1670 and was a native of Yorkshire. He emigrated to the West Indies and was a merchant. After the death of his wife, he moved to Pennsylvania, where he settled in Upland. In 1690, he remarried to Catharine Sandelands, daughter of James Sandelands, one of the earliest settlers in the area. He had six children with her.

Yeates purchased in 1697, a tract of land at the mouth of Naaman's Creek in New Castle County, on which he erected flour and bolting mills, and the following year he purchased additional land in Chester, where he established extensive granaries. He also established a bakery, and erected for himself the "venerable mansion," overlooking the Delaware River, where he resided for most of his life. Yeates had a good knowledge of the law, which gave him "considerable prominence" in the community. He was appointed to the Chester County courts where he served as a justice in 1694, and later was named to the Supreme Court of the Province of Pennsylvania. He was admitted to the Pennsylvania Provincial Council on December 25, 1696, where he held a position for the rest of his life. In October 1699, Yeates was elected the New Castle, Delaware representative in the General Assembly of the Province of Pennsylvania, and was leader of the representatives from the Lower Counties. He started the movement for Delaware to be independent from Pennsylvania, which led to the representatives from the New Castle, Sussex, and Kent counties to separate from the Pennsylvania assembly and start the Delaware General Assembly. After the separation, he was chosen as the New Castle County representative and served as the speaker of the assembly.

In 1701, Yeates purchased 1,377 acres of land along the Delaware River, where he built warehouses and stores and had a large mercantile business.

Yeates was a strong adherent to the Church of England, and served as a vestryman in the Christ Church, Philadelphia, as well as St. Paul's Church at Chester.

When Chester was established into a borough by William Penn in 1701, Yeates was named in the charter as one of the first four burgesses, and became chief burgess in 1703. At a meeting of the Pennsylvania Provincial Council 1704, he was named with others to survey and lay out a road, called "the Queen's Road," from Chester to Darby, connecting Chester more directly with Philadelphia and the settlements adjacent. Yeates was the recipient of a number of honorable and responsible commissions from the proprietor and the Crown.

On December 3, 1707, Yeates was named the chief justice of the Supreme Court of the Three Lower Counties (now known as the Delaware Supreme Court), where he served until resigning on April 11, 1710, to devote more time to his business. He was succeeded by John Healey. After his business prospered, Yeates again accepted the post of chief justice, succeeding Richard Birmingham on August 11, 1717. He served in that position until his death on May 2, 1720. He was buried in New Castle.

Yeates' grandson, also named Jasper Yeates, served on the Pennsylvania Supreme Court as an associate justice from 1791 to 1817.

Political offices
Preceded by William Clarke; Richard Birmingham	Justice of the Delaware Supreme Court; 1707–1710; 1717–1720	Succeeded by John Healey; John French
