= Howard W. Bramhall =

American judge (1895–1962)

Justice of the Delaware Supreme Court
- In office 1954–1962
- Nominated by: J. Caleb Boggs
- Preceded by: James M. Tunnell Jr.
- Succeeded by: Charles L. Terry Jr.

Vice Chancellor of Delaware
- In office 1951–1954
- Appointed by: Elbert N. Carvel
- Preceded by: Collins J. Seitz
- Succeeded by: William Marvel

Personal details
- Born: November 18, 1895 Georgetown, Delaware
- Died: July 7, 1962 (aged 66) Georgetown, Delaware
- Party: Republican
- Education: University of Delaware; Temple University

Howard Wellington Bramhall Sr. (November 18, 1895 – July 7, 1962) was an American judge who served as a justice of the Delaware Supreme Court from 1954 to 1962 and as Vice Chancellor of the State from 1951 to 1954.

== Biography ==
Bramhall was born in Georgetown, Delaware, and attended high school there. He received a bachelor's degree from University of Delaware in 1916, and a law degree from Temple University in 1920. Temple gave him an honorary degree of doctor laws in 1955. He practiced law near Philadelphia for about a decade after graduating from Temple, before joining the Delaware State Bar Association in 1930. He was the second-longest serving on the Sussex County bar. He also served on the State Board of Education, was director of the First National Bank of Dagsboro, and was president of the Sussex Finance Company.

In 1951, Bramhall was appointed by Elbert N. Carvel as vice chancellor on the Delaware Court of Chancery. He was unanimously confirmed by the state senate to a 12-year term. He served in that position until August 1954, when he was nominated by J. Caleb Boggs to serve on the Delaware Supreme Court as a justice, following the resignation of James M. Tunnell Jr. He was confirmed by the senate on August 30. He served on the court until his death in July 1962, following a battle with cancer.

Political offices
Preceded by Collins J. Seitz	Vice Chancellor of Delaware; 1951–1954	Succeeded by William Marvel
Preceded by James M. Tunnell Jr.	Justice of the Delaware Supreme Court; 1954–1962	Succeeded by Charles L. Terry Jr.
