= St. Paul's Episcopal Church (Georgetown, Delaware) =

Historic church in Delaware, United States

- U.S. National Register of Historic Places
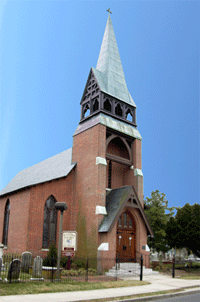
- St. Paul's Church

- Location within Delaware Location within the United States
- Location: 122 East Pine Street; Georgetown, Delaware
- Coordinates: 38°41′26″N 75°22′58″W
- Area: less than one acre
- Built: 1844, 1880
- Architect: McKim, Mead & White (1880 remodeling)
- Architectural style: Gothic
- NRHP reference No.: 79000649
- Added to NRHP: November 13, 1979

St. Paul's Protestant Episcopal Church is a historic Episcopal church located at 122 East Pine Street in Georgetown, Delaware, United States. The congregation started in 1794 but this brick building was completed in 1844. It was remodeled in 1881 by McKim, Mead & White of New York City in the early Victorian Gothic style. This is one of the 31 parish churches of the Episcopal Diocese of Delaware, and it is listed on the National Register of Historic Places. Many statesmen from Sussex County are interred in the churchyard, including Caleb R. Layton, Daniel J. Layton, Charles C. Stockley and others.

In 2015, the church reported 94 members; in 2023, it reported 44 members. No membership statistics were reported in 2024 national parochial reports. Plate and pledge financial support reported by the church in 2024 was $42,710. Average Sunday Attendance (ASA) reported in 2024 was 24 persons. This was a relative decrease from ASA of 45 reported in 2021.

== History ==
The congregation was organized on June 21, 1794 soon after the American Revolutionary War. The group acquired a plot of land on Front and Pine streets, though it was never used and sold in 1806. In the absence of a church structure, the Rev. James Wiltbank conducted services infrequently in the court house. In 1804 the congregation acquired the current lot at East Pine and Academy streets. They built a wood-frame structure over the next two decades.

In 1805 the Delaware legislature passed an act allowing this vestry to raise $1500 by lottery for the construction of the church. New congregations were learning how to support their parishes. A wooden church was constructed and on January 25, 1806, the Rev. Hamilton Bell dedicated it, though it was not complete. The legislature authorized another lottery in 1827 to raise $10,000 for the construction of an academy and a Masonic Hall in Georgetown, as well as for the completion of St. Paul's. This lottery was never held.

In 1843 the frame church was removed from the site and construction of a new brick church began. This structure was completed in 1844 and consecrated on November 19 of the same year. By 1881 after nearly 40 years, the church had fallen into relative disrepair. It was renovated and remodeled in the early Victorian Gothic style. It has been maintained in this style.

The Rev. James C. Kerr arrived in 1885 and installed the church's first pipe organ. The following year a Sunday School chapel was organized and a building for it was constructed in the 1870s. Finally in 1897 the complex was completed with a 29' by 43' two-story frame rectory, constructed on adjacent property by John W. Messick for the sum of $1500. The Rev. John Warnock was the first rector to live in the rectory.

In 1930 U.S. Senator Willard Saulsbury, Jr. bequeathed St. Paul's funds to commission a stained-glass altar window; the work is known as "The Te Deum Window," depicting the faith of the Church as stated in the creed-anthem Te Deum. The window was designed by James H. Hogan of the London studios of James Powell & Sons. It was dedicated February 9, 1930 by the bishop.

The National Register of Historic Places added the church to its list in 1979. In 1987 a fire of an unknown origin destroyed the parish hall, Sunday School classrooms and sacristy, though the sanctuary and nave were not damaged. These parts were subsequently rebuilt in 1990.

== Notable burials ==
- Caleb R. Layton, M.D., (8 September 1851 - 11 November 1930), U.S. Representative
- Daniel J. Layton, Esq., (1 August 1879 - 13 May 1960), Attorney General of Delaware, Chief Justice of Delaware Supreme Court
