= Richard Birmingham =

American judge (died c. 1726)

Chief Justice of the Delaware Supreme Court
- In office 1714–1717
- Preceded by: John Healey
- Succeeded by: Jasper Yeates

Associate Justice of the Delaware Supreme Court
- In office 1713–1713

Personal details
- Born: Unknown
- Died: c. 1726 Delaware

Richard Birmingham (? – c. 1726) was an American judge who served as Justice of the Colonial Delaware Supreme Court from 1713 to 1717.

He was appointed an associate justice on October 3, 1713, and served in that capacity for less than half a year before being named chief justice on March 10, 1714, the position he served in until August 1, 1717. He died in c. 1726.

Political offices
| Preceded by John Healey | Justice of the Delaware Supreme Court; 1714–1717 | Succeeded by Jasper Yeates |
