= Clarence A. Southerland =

American judge (1889–1973)

Chief Justice of the Delaware Supreme Court
- In office 1951–1963
- Preceded by: Charles S. Richards
- Succeeded by: Charles L. Terry Jr.

Attorney General of Delaware
- In office 1925–1929

Personal details
- Born: 1889 Baltimore, Maryland, US
- Died: June 16, 1973 (aged 84) Wilmington, Delaware, US
- Education: Georgetown Law School

Clarence A. Southerland (1889 – June 16, 1973) was Attorney General of Delaware from 1925 to 1929, and chief justice of the Delaware Supreme Court from 1951 to 1963, the first to hold the latter role in the newly established restructuring of the Delaware judiciary.

Born in Baltimore, Maryland, Southerland's family moved to Delaware during his childhood. He received a law degree from Georgetown Law School in 1913, and entered the practice of law in Delaware the following year. He served in the American Expeditionary Forces in France during World War I, and was a deputy attorney general of Delaware from 1921 to 1925, being elected Attorney General of Delaware from 1925 to 1929. In 1935, he successfully defended the case of New Jersey v. Delaware upholding Delaware's claim to the Twelve-Mile Circle around the city of New Castle, Delaware. In 1951, he was appointed as the first chief justice of the newly established Delaware Supreme Court by Governor Elbert N. Carvel. Southerland died at his home in Wilmington, Delaware, at the age of 84.

Legal offices
Preceded by Newly established court	Chief Justice of the Delaware Supreme Court; 1951–1963	Succeeded by Daniel F. Wolcott
Preceded by Sylvester D. Townsend Jr.	Attorney General of Delaware; 1925–1929	Succeeded by Reuben Satterthwaite Jr.
