= William H. Boyce =

American politician (1855–1942)

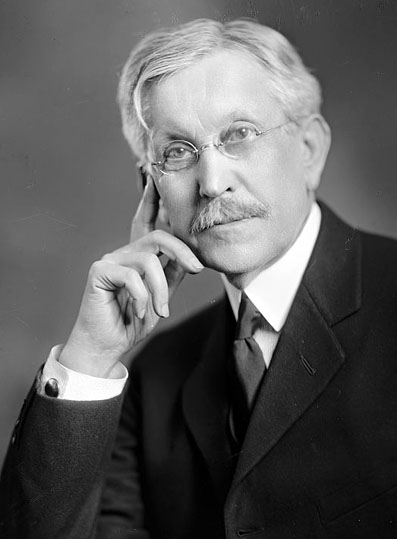

Member of the U.S. House of Representatives from Delaware's at-large district
- In office March 4, 1923 – March 3, 1925
- Preceded by: Caleb R. Layton
- Succeeded by: Robert G. Houston

Associate Justice Delaware Superior Court
- In office June 17, 1897 – June 15, 1921
- Preceded by: Charles M. Cullen
- Succeeded by: William W. Harrington

Personal details
- Born: November 28, 1855 Laurel, Delaware, U.S.
- Died: February 6, 1942 (aged 86) Dover, Delaware, U.S.
- Party: Democratic
- Spouse: Emma E. Valliant
- Profession: Lawyer

William Henry Boyce (November 28, 1855 – February 6, 1942) was an American lawyer and politician from Georgetown, in Sussex County, Delaware, and later from Dover, in Kent County, Delaware. He was a member of the Democratic Party, and served as Associate Justice of the Delaware Superior Court and U.S. Representative from Delaware.

== Early life and family ==
Boyce was born at Peppers Mills in Broad Creek Hundred, Sussex County, Delaware, near Laurel. He was the son of James H. and Sarah J. Otwell Boyce. James was in the lumber and merchandise business, and later farmed. He had been county treasurer and the state auditor of accounts from 1887 until 1891. William attended the Laurel Academy, and in 1882 he married Emma E. Valliant. They had two children, Valliant and James, and were members of St. Paul's Episcopal Church in Georgetown.

== Delaware lawyer ==
Beginning his career as an educator, Boyce was principal of the public schools at Laurel from 1875 until 1880, and at Oxford, Maryland, in 1880/1881. He was then appointed recorder of deeds for Sussex County, and served in that office from 1881 until 1886. During this time he studied the law under Alfred P. Robinson, was admitted to the bar in 1887, and began a practice in Georgetown. During these years he served variously as president of the Board of Education from 1883 until 1886; captain of Company G, Delaware National Guard, from 1887 until 1890; and president of the Georgetown Town Council from 1895 until 1897.

Boyce was also chairman of the Sussex County Democratic Committee from 1893 until 1897 and a delegate to the Democratic National Conventions in 1896 and 1924. He was appointed Delaware Secretary of State, and served from January 19, 1897, until June 17, 1897, when he was appointed Associate Justice of the Delaware Supreme Court. Boyce served there for 24 years, from June 17, 1897, until June 15, 1921.

== U.S. House of Representatives ==
Following his retirement, Boyce was elected to the U.S. House of Representatives in 1922, and served one term from March 4, 1923, until March 3, 1925. He defeated incumbent Republican U.S. Representative Caleb R. Layton. Layton claimed he was beaten by blacks, angered by his refusal to support an anti-lynching law in the Congress. Seeking re-election in 1924, Boyce lost to Republican Robert G. Houston, a journalist, also from Georgetown. Boyce was not "flashy", but was highly respected throughout the state. However, Houston had led the fight against J. Edward Addicks in Sussex County, had worked to clean up corruption in elections, and had been state Chairman of the Progressive Party. After his loss, Boyce resumed the practice of law in Dover, until his retirement from active practice in 1936.

== Death and legacy ==
Boyce died at Dover and is buried there in the Christ Episcopal Church Cemetery.

== Almanac ==
Elections are held the first Tuesday after November 1. U.S. Representatives took office March 4 and have a two-year term.

Public Offices
Office	Type	Location	Began office	Ended office	notes
Secretary of State	Executive	Dover	January 19, 1897	June 17, 1897	Delaware
Associate Justice	Judiciary	Dover	June 17, 1897	June 15, 1921	Superior Court
U.S. Representative	Legislature	Washington	March 4, 1923	March 3, 1925	

United States Congressional service
Dates	Congress	Chamber	Majority	President	Committees	Class/District
1923–1925	68th	U.S. House	Republican	Warren G. Harding; Calvin Coolidge		at-large

Election results
Year	Office	Subject	Party	Votes	%	Opponent	Party	Votes	%
1922	U.S. Representative	William H. Boyce	Democratic	39,126	54%	Caleb R. Layton	Republican	32,577	45%
1924	U.S. Representative	William H. Boyce	Democratic	35,943	41%	Robert G. Houston	Republican	51,536	59%

U.S. House of Representatives
Preceded by Caleb R. Layton	Member of the U.S. House of Representatives from Delaware's at-large congressional district 1923–1925	Succeeded by Robert G. Houston
