= Resident judge =

High-ranking judge in some courts

A resident judge is, in most jurisdictions, the next highest ranking judge beneath the chief justice or, in some jurisdictions the president judge.

A resident judge's duties might include:

making sure cases within the court centre are managed efficiently, alongside managing their own cases and caseload. They work with other judges at the court centre to make sure that work complies with current guidelines and good practice, and that, where needed, action is being taken to improve performance.

—

In the United States, the position of resident judge is more akin to a visiting or temporary judge, which can create an issue of jurisdiction.

== See also ==
- Court
- Common law
