= Gary Traynor =

American judge (born 1956)

Justice of the Delaware Supreme Court
- Incumbent
- Assumed office July 5, 2017
- Appointed by: John Carney
- Preceded by: Randy J. Holland

Personal details
- Born: August 25, 1956 (age 69) Dover, Delaware, U.S.
- Party: Republican
- Education: Dartmouth College (BA); Widener University (JD)

Gary Francis Traynor (born August 25, 1956) is an American lawyer who serves as a justice of the Delaware Supreme Court.

Traynor was born in Dover, Delaware, in 1956, and graduated from Dover High School. He completed a bachelor's degree in history at Dartmouth College in 1978, and a J.D. degree at Widener University Delaware Law School in 1982.

Traynor was in private practice in Dover from 1982 to 1990 at the law firm Brown, Shiels & Chasanov, and in Wilmington from 1990 to 2014 at the law firm Prickett, Jones & Elliot. He also served as an officer in the Delaware Army National Guard from 1990 to 1991, and was a commissioner on the Delaware River and Bay Authority from 2009 to 2014.

Traynor worked for the state as an assistant public defender for Sussex County from 2015 to 2017.

On February 9, 2017, Delaware Supreme Court justice Randy J. Holland announced that he would retire from the court at the end of March. On May 14, 2017, the Governor of Delaware John Carney announced that he would nominate Traynor to the vacant seat. Carney and Traynor knew each other through playing high school football in Delaware and they attended Dartmouth together.

Traynor is a Republican. Governor Carney, a Democrat, was required to nominate a Republican to replace Holland under state law, because no party can have more than three members on the state's supreme court.

The Delaware Senate unanimously confirmed Traynor's nomination on June 7, 2017. His twelve-year term on the Delaware Supreme Court began on July 5, 2017.

Legal offices
Preceded by Randy J. Holland	Justice of the Delaware Supreme Court; 2017–present	Incumbent
