= James T. Vaughn Jr. =

American judge (1949–2024)

Associate Justice of the Delaware Supreme Court
- In office October 29, 2014 – May 1, 2023
- Appointed by: Jack Markell
- Preceded by: Carolyn Berger
- Succeeded by: Abigail LeGrow

Personal details
- Born: August 5, 1949
- Died: October 10, 2024 (aged 75)
- Education: Duke University (BA); Georgetown University (JD)

Military service
- Allegiance: United States
- Branch/service: United States Army
- Years of service: Unknown

James T. Vaughn Jr. (August 5, 1949 – October 10, 2024) was an American lawyer who served as a justice of the Delaware Supreme Court from 2014 to 2023.

== Early life and education ==
Vaughn was the son of Delaware State Senator James T. Vaughn Sr. Vaughn graduated from J.B. Moore High School in Smyrna, Delaware, in 1967. He received his Bachelor of Arts from Duke University in 1971 and his Juris Doctor from the Georgetown University Law Center in 1976.

== Career ==
Vaughn was a United States Army veteran. From 1976 to 1988, Vaughn practiced law with Vaughn and Vaughn, where he focused on civil and criminal law. In 1988 he became a member of the firm of Schmittinger and Rodriguez in Dover.

On October 28, 1998, Governor Tom Carper appointed Vaughn as resident judge in Kent County of the Superior Court of Delaware; elevated to president judge of the Superior Court on October 12, 2004.

=== Delaware Supreme Court ===
On September 23, 2014, Governor Jack Markell nominated Vaughn to serve as an associate justice of the Delaware Supreme Court. He was nominated to fill the vacancy left by the retirement of Justice Carolyn Berger. On October 8, 2014, he was unanimously confirmed by the Delaware Senate. He was sworn into office on October 29, 2014.

He retired from the court on May 1, 2023.

== Death ==
Vaughn died on October 10, 2024, at the age of 75.

Legal offices
Preceded by Carolyn Berger	Justice of the Delaware Supreme Court; 2014–2023	Succeeded by Abigail LeGrow
