= Morgan Zurn =

American judge from Delaware

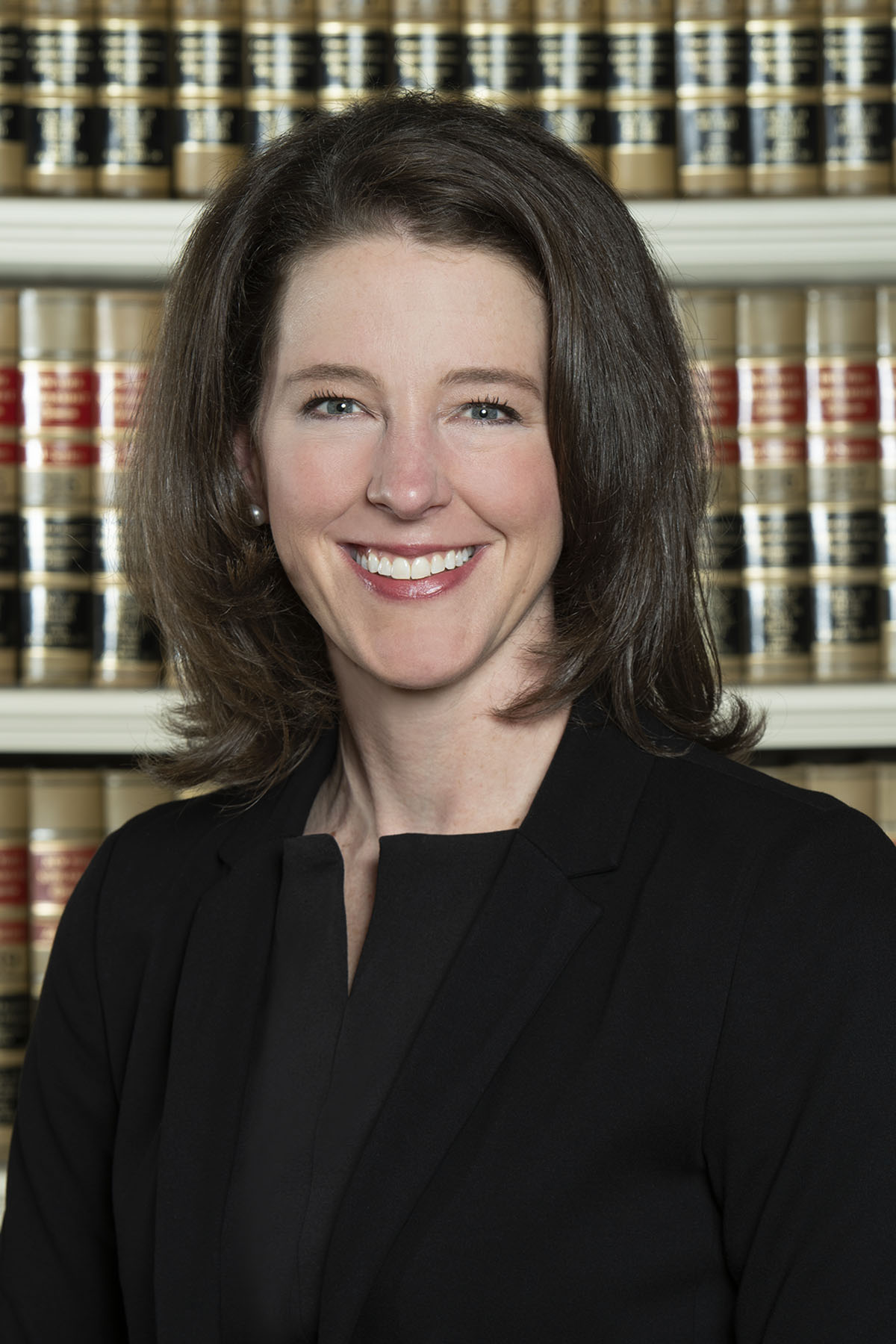

Justice of the Delaware Supreme Court
- Incumbent
- Assumed office July 29, 2026
- Appointed by: Matt Meyer
- Preceded by: Karen L. Valihura

Vice Chancellor of the Delaware Court of Chancery
- In office October 4, 2018 – July 29, 2026
- Appointed by: John Carney
- Preceded by: Seat established
- Succeeded by: Vacant

Personal details
- Party: Republican
- Education: University of Virginia (BA); University of Pennsylvania (MS, JD)

Morgan T. Zurn is an American lawyer currently serving as a justice of the Delaware Supreme Court. She previously served as a judge on the Delaware Court of Chancery.

== Career ==
Zurn received a Bachelor of Arts degree from the University of Virginia and received her master's in bioethics and J.D. from the University of Pennsylvania. She began her career as a patent lawyer. She then served as a Deputy Attorney General at the Delaware Department of Justice.

In September 2018, Governor John Carney nominated Zurn and Kathaleen McCormick to two new vice-chancellor positions on the Delaware Court of Chancery. Carney praised Zurn's "breadth of knowledge, devotion to public service and passion for her work." She was confirmed by the Delaware Senate on October 3 and was sworn in on October 4.

In June 2026, Governor Matt Meyer nominated Zurn to a seat on the Delaware Supreme Court, replacing retiring justice Karen L. Valihura. She was confirmed by the Delaware Senate on June 30, 2026.

=== Notable Cases ===
In September 2021, Zurn denied the defendants' motion to dismiss a stockholder derivative complaint based on the Boeing 737 MAX crashes that occurred in 2019. Two months later, the defendants—members of Boeing's board of directors—settled the litigation for $237.5 million. The settlement agreement obligated Boeing to "add another director to its 12-member board with aviation, engineering or product-safety oversight experience" and to amend its bylaws to "memorialize the separation of the CEO and board chairmanship" roles that the company adopted in 2019 in response to the crashes.

Also in September 2021, Zurn heard and decided DeMarco v. ChristianaCare Health Services, Inc., where the wife of a gravely ill COVID-19 patient sought an injunction forcing Wilmington Hospital to treat her husband with ivermectin. Zurn denied the requested injunction the morning after an expedited evidentiary hearing, holding "Patients, even gravely ill ones, do not have a right to a particular treatment, and medical providers' duty to treat is coterminous with their standard of care." Zurn's decision was cited favorably by courts addressing this issue around the country.

In 2023, Zurn presided over the settlement approval process in stockholder litigation related to a "novel equity restructuring" proposed by AMC Theatres, a notable meme stock. On July 21, 2023, Zurn rejected the parties' proposed settlement that "would allow the company to issue more shares, sending common shares soaring" up "69% after the closing bell." In her ruling, Zurn noted that an "unprecedented" number of stockholders—more than 2,800—objected to the proposed settlement. Zurn observed that "AMC's stockholder base is extraordinary" and that many AMC stockholders "care passionately about their stock ownership and the company." On August 11, 2023, Zurn approved a revised settlement in the AMC case.

Legal offices
Preceded by Karen L. Valihura	Justice of the Delaware Supreme Court; 2026–present	Incumbent
