= William Clarke (justice) =

American judge (died c. 1706)

William Clarke or Clark (died c. 1706) was a justice of the Supreme Court of the Lower Counties of Delaware from 1684 to 1706, and a justice of the Provincial Supreme Court of Pennsylvania from 1684 to 1693, later becoming chief justice of that court on April 10, 1703. During most of this period (from 1682 to 1704), Delaware and Pennsylvania were under a common general assembly.

Clarke "was one of the early settlers at Lewes soon after the occupation by the English, and was one of the magistrates, a surveyor and a member of Penn's Council". Clarke was elected from Sussex county to the first Assembly, at Chester, in 1682, and to Penn's first Council in 1683. The Delaware Supreme Court was initially chartered in 1684, by an act designating five members to serve on the court. One of these, William Welsh, died before July 10, 1684, and Clarke was appointed in his place. Clarke "was styled 'Justice in General' and was called the President of the counties of Philadelphia and New Castle". Clark was a slaveowner, and a record exists of him "purchasing a Negro named Black Will from a Maryland planter".

Clarke became Speaker of the separate Assembly for the Lower Counties, at Newcastle, in 1705, and "protested with the three other Friends, who were members, against the Militia act which was passed, though, as Speaker, he was obliged to sign the bill". It is reported that "[t]he same night he sickened, as he thought of a surfeit of cherries, and in two days died at Newcastle". Clarke served as president of the courts of Pennsylvania and the Lower Counties until his death, and was succeeded in this office by Jasper Yeates.
