= James Booth (legal writer) =

James Booth CB (d. 1880), secretary to the Board of Trade, fourth son of Thomas Booth of Toxteth Lodge, near Liverpool, after passing some time at St John's College, Cambridge, was admitted to the Society of Lincoln's Inn on 7 November 1818, when he was stated to be twenty-one years of age. He was called to the bar there on 10 February 1824, and practised with some success in the chancery courts. He was a member of the royal commission for inquiring into the municipal corporations of England and Wales in 1833. In 1838 he was applied to by the speaker to prepare for the use of the House of Commons what were called breviates of the private Bills. Booth's engagement was at first temporary, but at the end of the session of 1839 he was appointed counsel to the speaker, and examiner of recognisances. During the recess he undertook the preparation of skeleton Bills in unimproved form for all the more important classes of Bills. These became familiarly known as the "model Bills", and reference was constantly made to them by the select committees when Bills falling within any of the classes came before them. In the preparation of these Bills Booth had the co-operation of Robert John Palk, counsel to the chairman of the committees of the House of Lords. Booth's great work, however, was the preparation of the Clauses Consolidation Acts. Booth accepted the office of secretary to the Board of Trade on 10 October 1850, which he held until 1865. Subsequently to the passing of the Clauses Consolidation Acts he gave great assistance to Sir John Romilly in the preparation of various legislative measures for the government, the principal of these being the Act to regulate the proceedings of the High Court of Chancery in Ireland, passed in 1850. For his services he received an extra pension. After his retirement he acted on the commission for inquiring into trades unions and other associations, 12 February 1867, and prepared the draft report which appeared in the eleventh and last report of the commissioners dated 9 March 1869. His literary productions were chiefly confined to the various law magazines. In 1871 a work was published under the title of The Problem of the World and the Church reconsidered, in three letters to a friend by A Septuagenarian. Of this book Booth edited and brought out a second and revised edition in 1873, and six years later edited a third edition, with an introduction written by himself. He was created a CB on 6 July 1866. He died at 2 Princes Gardens, Kensington, on 11 May 1880, in his eighty-fourth year. He married in 1827 Miss Jane Noble, but was left a widower in 1872.
