= N. Christopher Griffiths =

American judge

Christopher Griffiths

Justice of the Delaware Supreme Court
- Incumbent
- Assumed office May 22, 2023
- Appointed by: John Carney
- Preceded by: Tamika Montgomery-Reeves

Personal details
- Party: Democratic
- Education: University of Delaware (BS); Villanova University (JD)

N. Christopher Griffiths is an American lawyer from Delaware who serves as a justice of the Delaware Supreme Court.

== Education ==
Griffiths is a graduate of Salesianum School. He received a Bachelor of Science from the University of Delaware in 2002. He received a Juris Doctor from the Villanova University School of Law in 2008.

== Career ==
Prior to practicing law, Griffiths served as a wealth manager for the Wilmington Trust Company and the Vanguard Group. He was a partner with Connolly Gallagher LLP focusing on administrative and government law; corporate and commercial litigation; bankruptcy law; and general litigation.

=== Delaware Supreme Court ===
On April 13, 2023, Governor John Carney nominated Griffiths to serve as a justice of the Delaware Supreme Court, to the seat vacated by Justice Tamika Montgomery-Reeves, who was appointed to the United States Court of Appeals for the Third Circuit.

His nomination came under scrutiny after it was reported that Griffiths pled guilty to reckless driving, alcohol-related in January 2023.

On May 3, 2023, the Delaware Senate confirmed him by a 15–4–2 vote. Republicans opposed him because his nomination left the Supreme Court without a Justice sitting in Kent County. He assumed office on May 22, 2023. Griffiths became the first Black man to serve on the supreme court.

== Awards and recognition ==
Griffiths has received the Delaware State Bar Association Young Lawyer of Distinguished Service Award, and the Supreme Court has appointed him as a Trustee of its Client Protection Fund. Chris also serves the board of the Delaware Law Related Education Center focusing on trial advocacy.

Legal offices
Preceded by Tamika Montgomery-Reeves	Justice of the Delaware Supreme Court; 2023–present	Incumbent
