= Jack B. Jacobs =

American judge

Justice of the Delaware Supreme Court
- In office 2003–2014
- Preceded by: Joseph T. Walsh
- Succeeded by: Karen L. Valihura

Vice Chancellor of the Delaware Court of Chancery
- In office 1985–2003
- Preceded by: Joseph T. Walsh
- Succeeded by: Donald F. Parsons

Personal details
- Born: July 23, 1942 (age 84)
- Education: University of Chicago; Harvard Law School

Jack Bernard Jacobs (born July 23, 1942) is a former justice of the Delaware Supreme Court, having served on that court from 2003 to 2014. He also served as a vice chancellor of the Delaware Court of Chancery from 1985 to 2003. He graduated from University of Chicago and Harvard Law School.
