= James B. Carey (judge) =

American judge (1905–1979)

James Burton Carey (February 17, 1905 – August 10, 1979) was a justice of the Delaware Supreme Court from 1963 to 1974. He died in 1979.

Born in Georgetown, Delaware, Carey received his law degree from the Temple University School of Law in Philadelphia, Pennsylvania, and thereafter worked for an insurance company in that city until the Great Depression forced his return to Georgetown. In 1945, he was appointed by Governor Walter W. Bacon to a seat on the Delaware Superior Court. A Republican, Carey's appointment maintained the political balance of the high court.

On May 3, 1963, Governor Elbert N. Carvel nominated Carey to a seat on the Delaware Supreme Court. Carey was promptly confirmed by the Delaware Senate. and was sworn into office for a twelve-year term beginning May 16, 1963. Carey served for eleven years, retiring from the court in May 1974, a year before the end of his term.

== Personal life and death ==
In 1941, Carey married Marguerite Frantz, a registered nurse who worked at a hospital where Carey's mother was treated for several weeks. They had a son, Wayne, and a daughter, Virginia.

Carey died in a convalescent home in Millsboro, Delaware, at the age of 74, following a lengthy illness. He was interred at St Paul's Episcopal Church in Georgetown.

Political offices
Preceded by Charles L. Terry Jr.	Justice of the Delaware Supreme Court; 1963–1974	Succeeded by John J. McNeilly Jr.
