= Tamika Montgomery-Reeves =

American judge (born 1981)

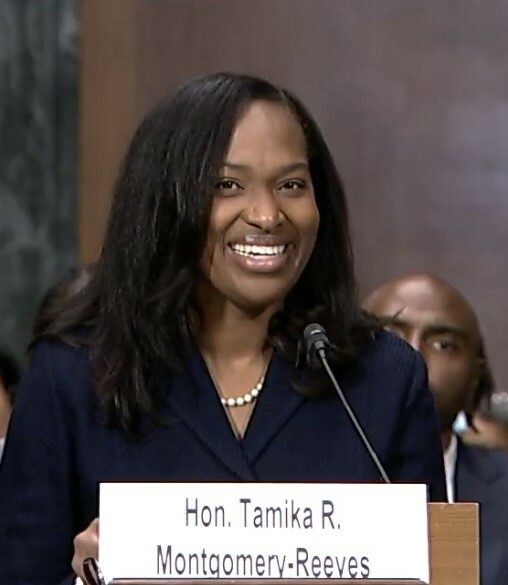

Judge of the United States Court of Appeals for the Third Circuit
- Incumbent
- Assumed office February 7, 2023
- Appointed by: Joe Biden
- Preceded by: Thomas L. Ambro

Justice of the Delaware Supreme Court
- In office January 3, 2020 – February 7, 2023
- Appointed by: John Carney
- Preceded by: Collins J. Seitz Jr.
- Succeeded by: N. Christopher Griffiths

Vice Chair, Delaware Court of Chancery
- In office November 2015 – November 2019
- Appointed by: Jack Markell
- Preceded by: Donald F. Parsons
- Succeeded by: Paul Fioravanti Jr

Personal details
- Born: Tamika Renee Montgomery; 1981 (age 44–45) Jackson, Mississippi, U.S.
- Party: Democratic
- Education: University of Mississippi (BA); University of Georgia (JD)

Tamika Renee Montgomery-Reeves (née Montgomery; born 1981) is an American lawyer who serves as a United States circuit judge of the United States Court of Appeals for the Third Circuit. She previously served as an Associate Justice of the Delaware Supreme Court.

== Early life and education ==
Montgomery was born in Jackson, Mississippi, to Dewrey and Bettye (nee Cribbs) Montgomery. She received a Bachelor of Arts, magna cum laude, from the University of Mississippi in 2003 and a Juris Doctor from the University of Georgia School of Law in 2006.

== Career ==
Montgomery-Reeves practiced at Wilson Sonsini Goodrich & Rosati in Wilmington where she focused on corporate governance and commercial litigation. She also practiced at Weil Gotshal & Manges in New York City, where she focused on corporate governance and securities litigation. Montgomery-Reeves was appointed Vice Chancellor of the Delaware Court of Chancery in 2015 and has worked pro bono with the Prisoners' Rights Project. Montgomery-Reeves joined Chief Justice Collins J. Seitz Jr. on the steering committee of a group that completed a strategic plan for increasing diversity in Delaware's judiciary and legal community.

=== Delaware judicial service ===
On October 13, 2015, Delaware Governor Jack Markell nominated Montgomery-Reeves to the Delaware Court of Chancery to succeed Vice Chancellor Donald F. Parsons

On October 24, 2019, Governor John Carney announced the nomination of Montgomery-Reeves to be a justice of the Delaware Supreme Court, to fill the vacancy left by the elevation of Collins J. Seitz Jr. to Chief Justice. On November 7, 2019, her nomination was confirmed by the Delaware Senate. She was the first African-American justice on that court. She was sworn into office on January 3, 2020. In 2021, Montgomery-Reeves wrote the majority opinion holding that Senate records submitted to the University of Delaware archives by President Biden were not subject to demands under the Delaware Freedom of Information Act. Her service as a justice of the Delaware Supreme Court ended on February 7, 2023, when she was elevated to the United States Court of Appeals for the Third Circuit.

=== Federal judicial service ===
On June 29, 2022, President Joe Biden announced his intent to nominate Montgomery-Reeves to serve as a United States circuit judge for the United States Court of Appeals for the Third Circuit. On July 11, 2022, her nomination was sent to the Senate. President Biden nominated Montgomery-Reeves to the seat vacated by Judge Thomas L. Ambro, who announced his intent to assume senior status upon confirmation of a successor. On September 7, 2022, a hearing on her nomination was held before the Senate Judiciary Committee. Montgomery-Reeves was unanimously rated "well qualified" for the judgeship by the American Bar Association's Standing Committee on the Federal Judiciary.

During her confirmation hearing, Republican senators questioned Montgomery-Reeves about a strategic plan to increase diversity in Delaware's judiciary. The plan was based on recommendations made by the Delaware Supreme Court's Diversity Strategic Planning Steering Committee, which Montgomery-Reeves had co-chaired. She was asked about a recommendation that prospective lawyers be able to use clerkships and recommendations in lieu of passing the bar exam, which the committee said was a barrier to minority people. The committee also recommended that portraits of white judges and justices be removed from courthouses as a way to "reduce implicit bias and identity threat in the court environment." Montgomery-Reeves distanced herself from these recommendations by saying that she had neither written nor edited any of them despite being committee co-chair. On September 28, 2022, her nomination was reported out of committee by a 13–9 vote. On December 8, 2022, the United States Senate invoked cloture on her nomination by a 57–39 vote. On December 12, 2022, her nomination was confirmed by a 53–35 vote. She received her judicial commission on February 7, 2023.

== See also ==
- Joe Biden Supreme Court candidates
- List of African American federal judges
- List of African American jurists
- List of justices of the Delaware Supreme Court

Legal offices
Preceded by Collins J. Seitz Jr.	Justice of the Delaware Supreme Court; 2020–2023	Succeeded by N. Christopher Griffiths
Preceded by Thomas L. Ambro	Judge of the United States Court of Appeals for the Third Circuit; 2023–present	Incumbent
