= Henry du Pont Ridgely =

American judge

Henry du Pont Ridgely (born May 31, 1949) is a former justice of the Delaware Supreme Court who retired on January 31, 2015.

Ridgley was a descendant of Colonial Delaware Supreme Court Justice Nicholas Ridgely, who had built a mansion called Eden Hill, which had previously been acquired by the Delaware Department of Transportation. During the latter Ridgley's service on the court, Eden Hill was refurbished for use as Ridgley's judicial chambers.
