= James Booth Jr. =

American judge (1789–1855)

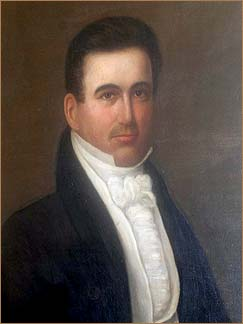
- Supreme Court Chief Justice of Delaware

Chief Justice of Delaware Supreme Court
- In office (1841–1855)
- Preceded by: Richard H. Bayard
- Succeeded by: Samuel M. Harrington

Personal details
- Born: November 21, 1789 New Castle, Delaware, U.S.
- Died: March 29, 1855 (aged 65) New Castle, Delaware, U.S.
- Resting place: Immanuel Church, New Castle, Delaware

James Booth Jr. (November 21, 1789 – March 29, 1855) was an American judge, the chief justice of what later became the Delaware Supreme Court from 1841 until his death in 1855.

== Early and family life ==
Born in New Castle, Delaware, the son of Delaware Supreme Court Chief Justice James Booth Sr., the younger James Booth had a younger brother William Booth (1799–1870) and sisters Maria Booth Rogers (1786–1870) and Elizabeth Booth (1796–1883). He graduated from Princeton University. He married Hannah Rogers, the daughter of Governor Daniel Rogers and they had a son James Rogers Booth (1828–1896) and daughters Anna Rogers Booth Lockwood (1820–1894) and Julia M Booth Burton (1833–1921).

== Career ==
After reading law, Booth was admitted to the Delaware bar in 1812. Nearly three decades later, in 1841, Governor William B. Cooper appointed him Chief Justice of Delaware's Court of Appeals to succeed Richard H. Bayard, who had become one of the state's two U.S. Senators.

This Booth may be best known for granting a writ of habeas corpus in 1846, which freed the enslaved wife and children of freedman Samuel Hawkins, who were thus allowed to ride to Pennsylvania and freedom. However, the two owners of Hawkins' wife and children would seek the prosecution of Quakers John Hunn and Thomas Garrett for violating the federal Fugitive Slave Act, and the heavy fines assessed by U.S. Supreme Court Chief Justice Roger Taney had severe consequences for the Garrett and Hunn families.

== Death and legacy ==
Booth died in 1855. His widow, siblings, son and daughters would survive in the American Civil War.
