= Collins J. Seitz Jr. =

American judge (born 1957)

Collins Seitz

Chief Justice of the Delaware Supreme Court
- Incumbent
- Assumed office November 8, 2019
- Appointed by: John Carney
- Preceded by: Karen L. Valihura (acting)

Justice of the Delaware Supreme Court
- In office April 14, 2015 – November 8, 2019
- Appointed by: Jack Markell
- Preceded by: Henry du Pont Ridgely
- Succeeded by: Tamika Montgomery-Reeves

Personal details
- Born: September 14, 1957 (age 68)
- Party: Democratic
- Education: University of Delaware (BA); Villanova University (JD)

Collins J. Seitz Jr. (born September 14, 1957) is the chief justice of the Delaware Supreme Court.

== Education ==
Seitz received a Bachelor of Arts degree from the University of Delaware in 1980. He earned a Juris Doctor degree from the Villanova University School of Law and was admitted to the Delaware Bar in 1983.

== Legal career ==
Seitz served as managing partner of Connolly Bove Lodge & Hutz LLP, where he practiced for more than three decades. He was the founding partner of Seitz, Ross, Aronstam & Moritz LLP. In that capacity, he regularly litigated corporate, commercial, and intellectual property cases, and advised clients on issues of Delaware corporate law.

== Delaware Supreme Court ==
=== Term as justice ===
On February 23, 2015, Governor Jack Markell nominated Seitz to be a justice of the Delaware Supreme Court to the seat vacated by Henry du Pont Ridgely who retired on January 31, 2015. He was sworn in on April 14, 2015.

=== Chief justice ===
On October 24, 2019, Governor John Carney announced Seitz as his nominee to be the next Chief Justice of the Delaware Supreme Court. On November 7, 2019, his nomination was confirmed unanimously by the Delaware Senate. He was sworn into office on November 8, 2019.

== Personal life ==
Seitz's sister is Virginia A. Seitz, an attorney who served as United States Assistant Attorney General for the Office of Legal Counsel from 2011 to 2013. His father is Collins J. Seitz, who served as a Judge on the United States Court of Appeals for the Third Circuit until his death in 1998.

Legal offices
Preceded by Henry du Pont Ridgely	Justice of the Delaware Supreme Court; 2015–2019	Succeeded by Tamika Montgomery-Reeves
Preceded by Karen L. Valihura; Acting	Chief Justice of the Delaware Supreme Court; 2019–present	Incumbent
