= Samuel Milby Harrington =

U.S. Marine Corps officer (1882–1948)

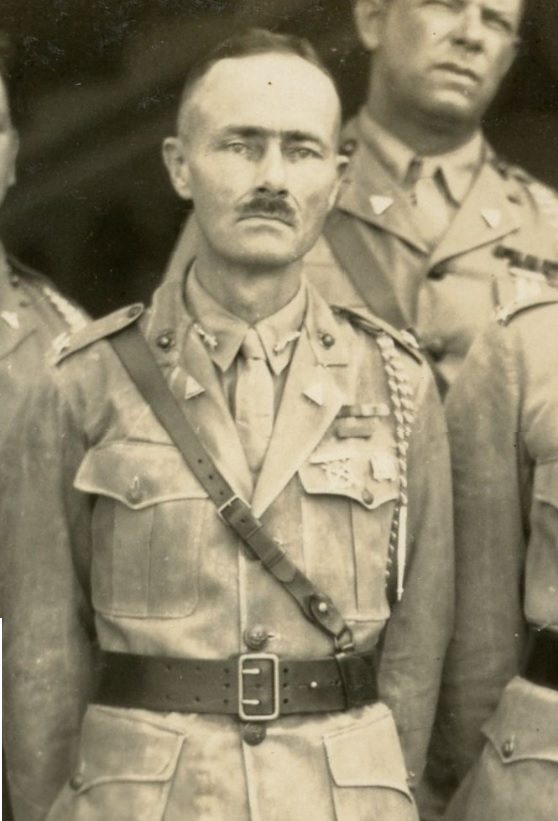
- Harrington with the Guardia Nacional de Nicaragua
- Born: November 13, 1882; Annapolis, Maryland
- Died: March 31, 1948 (aged 65); Annapolis, Maryland
- Relatives: RADM Purnell F. Harrington, USN (Father)
- Military career
- Allegiance: United States
- Branch: United States Marine Corps
- Service years: 1909–1945
- Rank: Brigadier general
- Commands: 5th Marine Regiment
- Conflicts: Banana Wars: Dominican Campaign; Haitian Campaign; Nicaraguan Campaign; World War I World War II
- Awards: Navy Distinguished Service Medal

Samuel Milby Harrington (November 13, 1882 – March 31, 1948) was an officer of the United States Marine Corps with the rank of brigadier general. His last service assignment was the president of the Permanent General Court Martial Board during World War II. He is the author of The Strategy and Tactics of Small Wars from 1921 and co-author of Small Wars Manual.

== Early service ==
Harrington was born on November 13, 1882, in Annapolis, Maryland, as the son of future Rear Admiral Purnell F. Harrington and his wife Mia Nelthropp. He attended Yale University and graduated in 1906 with Bachelor of Arts degree. After the graduation, Harrington worked for some time as cub reporter for New York Evening Sun and subsequently in W. R. Grace and Company. Finally he decided to follow his father's military career and entered the United States Marine Corps on January 22, 1909. He was commissioned a second lieutenant in the Marine Corps and assigned to the officer course at Marine Corps Officers School at Marine Barracks Port Royal, South Carolina.

He finished the course on December 29, 1909, and was assigned to the Marine detachment aboard the battleship USS Idaho. He sailed with the ship across the Atlantic Ocean as a part of the Third Division of the Atlantic Fleet and finished his voyage first in England, and then in France. Harrington was then stationed at Guantanamo Bay Naval Base until June 1911, when he was ordered back to the United States and assigned to the Marine barracks at Norfolk Navy Yard, where he served as post quartermaster. While in Guantanamo, he was promoted to the rank of first lieutenant on May 23, 1911.

His next expeditionary duty came at the end of July 1913, when he was assigned to the First Brigade of Marines and sailed first to Philippines and then almost immediately to China, where he served within Marine detachment, American Legation Guard in Peking. Harrington served there first with 38th Company, before he was appointed post adjutant in 1914.

Harrington returned to the United States in February 1916 and was briefly stationed at Marine Barracks San Diego, before he was attached to the Second Marine Brigade and sailed under the command of Brigadier General Joseph H. Pendleton to the Dominican Republic. He arrived in Santo Domingo on June 6, 1916, and subsequently participated in the engagements at Guayacanes, Pimentel or Las Trincheras. Harrington then participated in the collecting of weapons in the provinces of Azua and Barahona until 27 April 1917.

At the end of February 1918, Harrington returned to the United States and was assigned to the Marine Barracks Port Royal, South Carolina, before he was transferred to the Marine Barracks Quantico, Virginia, on November 16, 1918, and appointed post adjutant to Brigadier General John Twiggs Myers.

== Middle of career ==
Harrington remained in Peking, China, until June 1916, when he was ordered to participate in an expeditionary force in Santo Domingo, a duty he served with until 1918. Harrington returned to the United States in early 1918 and promptly served with a number of different military installations in a myriad of locations. The chart below depicts Harrington's military career until the breakout of the Second World War.(Quantico Marine Barracks and Fort Benning) until 1922. From 1922 until 1925 Harrington served as department commander with the Gendarmerie D'Haiti.

Year	Location	Position
1918–1919	Quantico, VA	Adjutant
1919–1920	Fort Benning, GA	Liaison Officer
1920–1922	Quantico, VA	Instructor – Marine Corp School
1922–1925	Republic of Haiti	Department Commander in the Gendarmerie D'Haiti
1926–1927	Quantico, VA	Instructor – Marine Corp School
1927–1929	Nicaragua	Constabulary Detachment member – Guardia Nacional
1929–1934	Washington D.C.	Major – Marine Corps Headquarters
1935–1936	Pacific Ocean	Colonel – U.S.S. California
1937–1938	Quantico, VA	Commanding Officer – Fifth Marine Regiment
1938–1939	Quantico, VA	Executive Officer – First Marine Brigade
1939–1941	Quantico, VA	Brigadier general and president of the Naval Examining Board
1941	Washington, DC	Director – Marine Corps Reserve

== World War II ==
With the United States entry to World War II, Brigadier General Harrington already served as commandant of Marine Corps Schools within Marine Corps Base Quantico, Virginia. This school under his command served as main facility, where all Marine officers receive their basic training here, as well as enlisted technicians from many different disciplines. Harrington was relieved January 1, 1943, and retired on the same date.

However, he remained on active duty and was appointed the president of the Marine Corps Equipment Board, staying in this capacity until July 1943. His next assignment was with Permanent General Court Martial Board, where he served until February 1945, when he retired from the Marine Corps.

For his long military service in the United States Marine Corps, Brigadier General Harrington was decorated with the Navy Distinguished Service Medal.

== Personal life ==
On July 27, 1921, Brigadier General Samuel M. Harrington married Marion Nutting Meehan, daughter of Willard Holmes and Margaret Jessie (Wallace) Nutting. They went on to have two children together, a son named Samuel Milby Harrington Jr. and daughter named Margaret Willard Harrington.

He was an hereditary companion of the Military Order of the Loyal Legion of the United States (MOLLUS). He was assigned MOLLUS insignia number 16527.

Harrington died on March 31, 1948, in Annapolis, Maryland, following a complications of arteriosclerosis. He is buried at United States Naval Academy Cemetery.

== Decorations ==
Here is the ribbon bar of Brigadier General Harrington:

1st Row	Navy Distinguished Service Medal			
2nd Row	Marine Corps Expeditionary Medal with three service stars	Dominican Campaign Medal	World War I Victory Medal with West Indies clasp	Nicaraguan Campaign Medal
3rd Row	American Defense Service Medal with Atlantic Fleet clasp	American Campaign Medal	World War II Victory Medal	Nicaraguan Presidential Order of Merit with gold star
