= Joseph T. Walsh =

American judge

Joseph Thomas Walsh (May 18, 1930 – August 15, 2014) was an American jurist.

== Early life ==
Joseph Walsh was born to Joseph Patrick and Mary Bolton Walsh on May 18, 1930, in an elevator at St. Francis Hospital in Wilmington, Delaware. He grew up in Wilmington, the second of six children. His parents were second-generation immigrants from Ireland. His siblings were sisters Theresa Taylor, Dora Carr, and Pat Walls; and brothers Jim Walsh and Judge Peter J. Walsh.

== Education ==
Walsh graduated from Salesianum School in 1948 and received his bachelor's degree from La Salle University in Philadelphia, Pennsylvania, in 1952. Walsh went on to earn his law degree from the Georgetown University Law Center in 1954.

== Career ==
Walsh served in the Judge Advocate General's Corps, United States Army. In 1972, he was named Delaware Superior Court Judge and in 1984 was appointed vice chancellor of the Delaware Court of Chancery. From 1985 until 2005, Walsh served on the Delaware Supreme Court. Walsh was an adjunct professor at the Widener University School of Law. He was co-founder of the Carpenter-Walsh Delaware Pro Bono American Inn of Court.

== Personal life ==
He married Madeline Lamb on October 16, 1954. Together they raised six children: Kevin, Lois, Patrick, Daniel, Thomas, and Nancy. Walsh was active in the Catholic Church, serving as a trustee of St. Joseph on the Brandywine Church and as member of the Catholic Diocese Finance Committee and Real Estate Committee. He formerly served as a trustee of the Catholic Diocese Foundation and was a founding member of the St. Thomas More Society in the Diocese of Wilmington.

== Death ==
Walsh died in Newark, Delaware, of cancer.
