= James Charles Booth =

James Charles Booth (died 1778) was a leading English conveyancer.

== Life ==
He was born at St. Germain-en-Laye, the son of Charles Booth (1666/7–1740), a Jacobite courtier. Concealing his background he matriculated at Magdalen College, Oxford, and entered the Middle Temple, both 1722. He then took rooms in Lincoln's Inn.

Roman Catholics were disabled by the Oaths, etc. Act 1695 (7 & 8 Will. 3 c. 24) from practising at the bar. Booth, from a Catholic family, took out a license to practise as a conveyancer, and built up business. On the death of Nathaniel Pigott, the leading conveyancer of his day, and also a Catholic, Booth succeeded to his position.

Booth was for some years a close friend of Lord Mansfield. In politics he was a Tory. In his later years he suffered from cataracts. He died on 14 January 1778.

== Reputation ==
Booth's conveyances, though prolix, enjoyed a high reputation with his fellow professionals, and were often copied. He is said to have been consulted by the Duke of Cumberland whether he could recover a legacy left him by his father, George II, the new king George III having torn up the will, and to have advised that "a king of England has by the common law no power to bequeath personal property"; he is also said to have drafted George III's will.

== Family ==
Late in life Booth married Mary Sharp, daughter of John Sharp (1678–1727), Member of Parliament for Ripon. They subsequently separated.

== Notes ==
Attribution

This article incorporates text from a publication now in the public domain: Stephen, Leslie, ed. (1886). "Booth, James (d.1778)". Dictionary of National Biography. Vol. 5. London: Smith, Elder & Co.
