= Nicholas Ridgely (born 1694) =

American judge (1694–1755)

Nicholas Ridgely (February 2, 1694 – February 18, 1755) was colonial justice of the Supreme Court of the Lower Counties of Delaware from 1746 until his death in 1755.

== Biography ==
Born in Maryland, Ridgely was the grandson of Colonel Henry Ridgley, and settled in Delaware in 1732, and in Dover, Delaware, specifically in 1736.

Ridgely "served first as a magistrate of the court before he became one of the provincial justices of the Delaware Supreme Court in 1740". In 1745, the colonial supreme court consisted of three members: Ryves Holt, Jehu Curtis, and Ridgely. In 1746, when Caesar Rodney was orphaned at the age of 17, the Delaware Orphan's Court named Ridgley as Rodney's guardian.

== Personal life and death ==
In 1749, Ridgely built a mansion called Eden Hill, which generations later was acquired by the Delaware Department of Transportation, and later still renovated for use by the courts, and occupied by Ridgely's descendent, Delaware Supreme Court justice Henry du Pont Ridgely. Other descendants of Ridgely's who also served on the Delaware Supreme Court included Henry Ridgely Horsey and Maurice Hartnett.

Ridgely was married three times, first to Sarah Worthington in 1711, then to Ann French (Gordon) in 1723, and lastly to Mary Middleton (Vining) in 1736. Between his three wives, Ridgely fathered ten children, and had numerous prominent descendants. Ridgely died in Delaware at the age of 61.
