= Karen L. Valihura =

American judge (born 1963)

Karen Valihura

Justice of the Delaware Supreme Court
- In office July 25, 2014 – July 25, 2026
- Appointed by: Jack Markell
- Preceded by: Jack B. Jacobs
- Succeeded by: Morgan Zurn

Chief Justice of the Delaware Supreme Court
- Acting
- In office October 30, 2019 – November 8, 2019
- Preceded by: Leo E. Strine Jr.
- Succeeded by: Collins J. Seitz Jr.

Personal details
- Born: May 16, 1963 (age 63)
- Party: Republican
- Education: Washington and Jefferson College (BA); University of Pennsylvania (JD)

Karen Lynn Valihura (born May 16, 1963) is an American lawyer who served as a justice of the Delaware Supreme Court from 2014 to 2026. Prior to her appointment, Valihura was a partner at Skadden, Arps, Slate, Meagher & Flom, LLP.

In June 2014, Governor Jack Markell nominated Valihura to the Delaware Supreme Court, to replace retiring Justice Jack B. Jacobs. She was confirmed by the Delaware Senate on June 25 and sworn in on July 25 for a 12-year term. She is the second woman to serve on the court, after Justice Carolyn Berger.

In October 2018, Justice Valihura dissented when the majority found that the business judgment rule protected a controlling shareholder even though he did not offer minority shareholder protections until after his initial squeeze-out bid.

Legal offices
Preceded by Jack B. Jacobs	Justice of the Delaware Supreme Court; 2014–2026	Succeeded by Morgan Zurn
Preceded by Leo E. Strine Jr.	Chief Justice of the Delaware Supreme Court; Acting; 2019	Succeeded by Collins J. Seitz Jr.
