= James Booth Sr. =

American politician and judge (1753–1828)

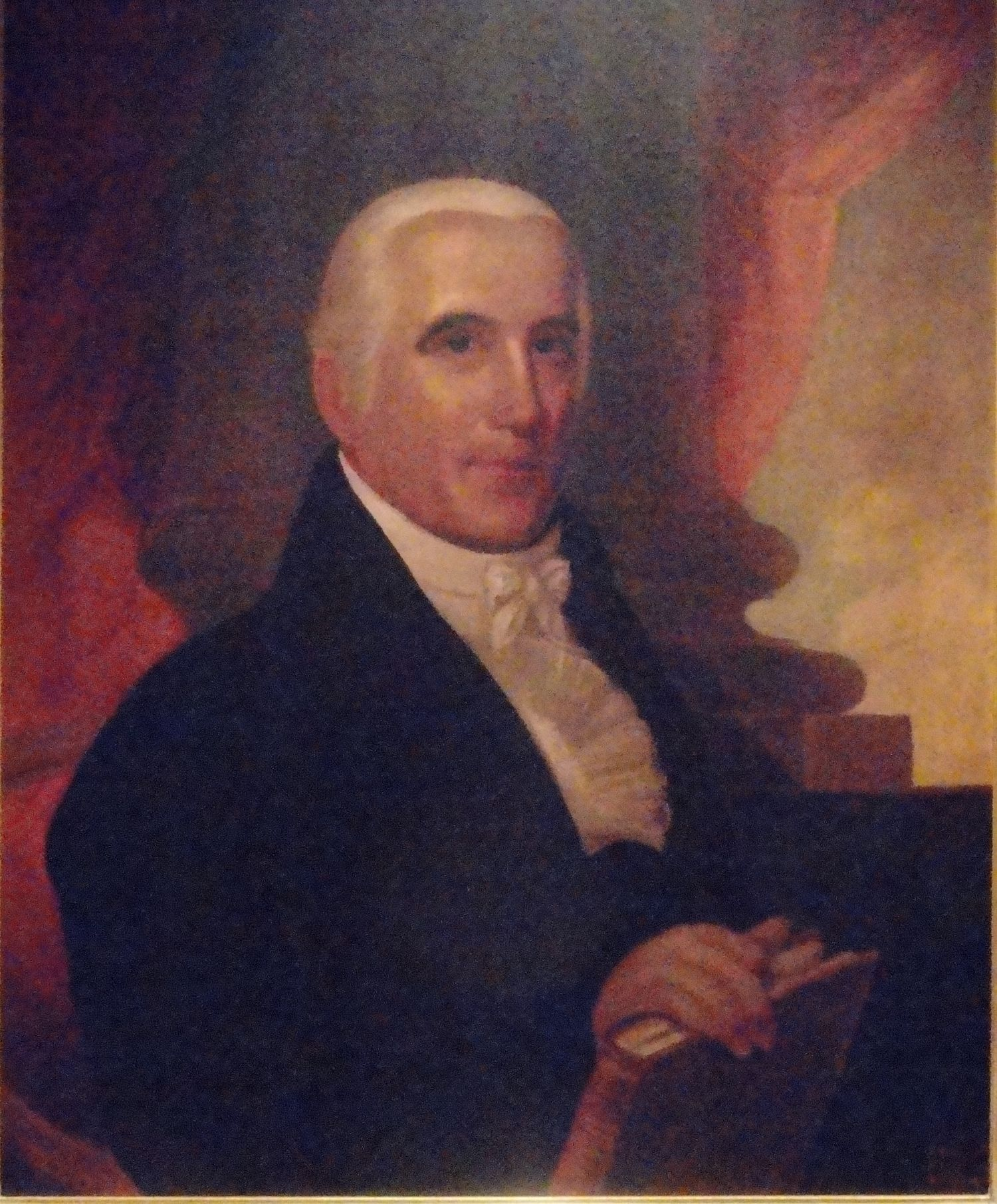
- Chief Justice of the Delaware Court of Common Pleas

Chief Justice of Delaware Supreme Court
- In office 1799–1828
- Preceded by: Richard Bassett

Personal details
- Born: February 6, 1753 New Castle, Delaware, U.S.
- Died: February 3, 1828 (aged 74) New Castle, Delaware, U.S.
- Resting place: Immanuel Church, New Castle, Delaware
- Children: James Booth Jr.

James Booth Sr. (February 6, 1753 – February 3, 1828) was the Secretary of State of Delaware (1778-1799) and the Chief Justice of the Delaware Court of Common Pleas (1799-1828). His son James Booth Jr. would serve as Delaware's Chief Justice from 1841 until his death in 1855.
