= William Till =

American judge

William Till (c.1697 – April 13, 1766) was a colonial-era American politician, jurist, and merchant.

He settled in Sussex County, Delaware around 1720 and served in the provincial assembly and as a justice of the peace. Till served as mayor of Philadelphia (1742–43), as chief justice of the Delaware Supreme Court (1743–45), and later served as an associate justice (appointed 1754). At his death he held the post of Collector of the port of New Castle. He was a member of the Pennsylvania Provincial Council from 1741 to 1766.

In 1720 Till married Mary Lillingston, who survived him. They had two children, Thomas Till (who died before his father) and Mary. Thomas' widow, Gertrude Ross Till, was the sister of one signer of the Declaration of Independence, George Ross, and married another, George Read.

His daughter, Mary Till, married Andrew Hamilton II, the son of the famous lawyer Andrew Hamilton, on December 24, 1741. They had two children, Andrew Hamilton III and William Hamilton, famous as a gentleman and for the landscaping of his property of The Woodlands.
