= Samuel Maxwell Harrington =

Delaware Supreme Court justice (1803–1865)

Samuel Maxwell Harrington (1803 – November 28, 1865) was a Delaware judge who served as a justice of the Delaware Supreme Court from 1830 to 1839 and again from 1855 to 1857.

Harrington served as chief justice of the Delaware Supreme Court from October 16, 1830, until the constitution changed and he became an associate judge. He was reappointed by Delaware's Governor David Hazzard and was seated January 18, 1832. He was appointed chief justice of Delaware again on April 3, 1855. He became Chancellor of the Court of Chancery on May 4, 1857.

Harrington, Delaware is named for him.

He was an abolitionist. He was pictured in an engraving, and was painted by Ethel Harrington.

He married and had children including Samuel Maxwell Harrington Jr. (1840 - 1878), who read law under Harrington's tutelage.

Political offices
| Preceded by Thomas Clayton | Chief Justice of the Delaware Supreme Court; 1830–1837 | Succeeded by John M. Clayton |
