= Unitrin, Inc. v. American General Corp. =

Delaware corporate law case

- Court: Supreme Court of Delaware
- Full case name: Unitrin, Inc., James E. Annable, Reuben L. Hedlund, Jerrold V. Jerome, George A. Roberts, Fayez S. Sarofim, Henry E. Singleton and Richard C. Vie v. American General Corp. (In re Unitrin, Inc. Shareholders Litigation)
- Decided: January 11, 1995
- Citation: 651 A.2d 1361 (Del. 1995)

Court membership
- Judges sitting: Daniel L. Herrmann, John J. McNeilly, Jr., Henry R. Horsey, Andrew G.T. Moore II, & Andrew D. Christie

Unitrin, Inc. v. American General Corp., 651 A.2d 1361 (Del. 1995) is the leading case on a board of directors' ability to use defensive measures, such as poison pills or buybacks, to prevent a hostile takeover. The case demonstrates an approach to corporate governance that favors the primacy of the board of directors over the will of the shareholders.

== Background ==
American General Corp. tendered an offer for a controlling block of shares of Unitrin. The board of directors of Unitrin, who held 23% of the shares, did not think the price offered was adequate and so initiated a poison pill and offered a buyback to increase their holdings to 28% of the total shares.

The trial court found that the offer represented a threat of "substantive coercion", and based on the Unocal v. Mesa Petroleum test, the poison pill was reasonable but the repurchase was not. The issue before the Supreme Court of Delaware was whether the repurchasing was a reasonable reaction to American General's threat.

== Judgment ==
The Delaware Supreme Court found that the Delaware Court of Chancery erred in its application of the Unocal standard. The court must first determine whether the defensive measure is "draconian" in that it has the effect of precluding or coercing shareholders choice. Only after that determination should the inquiry shift to whether the measure is within the range of reasonableness in response to the perceived threat. In the case, the Supreme Court did not find the repurchasing action was per se preclusive or coercive, and remanded the case to the Court of Chancery to determine if the poison pill and repurchase plan were "within the range of reasonable defensive measures."

== See also ==
- Unocal v. Mesa Petroleum, 493 A.2d 946 (Del. 1985)
