= Revlon, Inc. v. MacAndrews & Forbes Holdings, Inc. =

1986 decision of Delaware Supreme Court

- Court: Supreme Court of Delaware
- Full case name: Revlon, Inc., a Delaware corporation, Michel C. Bergerac, Simon Aldewereld, Sander P. Alexander, Jay I. Bennett, Irving J. Bottner, Jacob Burns, Lewis L. Glucksman, John Loudon, Aileen Mehle, Samuel L. Simmons, Ian R. Wilson, Paul P. Woolard, Ezra K. Zilkha, Forstmann Little & Co., a New York limited partnership, and Forstmann Little & Co. Subordinated Debt and Equity Management Buyout Partnership-II, a New York limited partnership v. MacAndrews & Forbes Holdings, Inc., a Delaware corporation
- Decided: November 1, 1985 (oral decision); March 13, 1986 (written opinion)
- Citation: 506 A.2d 173 (Del. 1986)

Court membership
- Judges sitting: John J. McNeilly, Jr., Andrew G.T. Moore II, Justices, and Balick, Judge

Revlon, Inc. v. MacAndrews & Forbes Holdings, Inc., 506 A.2d 173 (Del. 1986), was a landmark decision of the Delaware Supreme Court on hostile takeovers.

The Court declared that, in certain limited circumstances indicating that the "sale" or "break-up" of the company is inevitable, the fiduciary obligation of the directors of a target corporation are narrowed significantly, the singular responsibility of the board being to maximize immediate stockholder value by securing the highest price available. The role of the board of directors transforms from "defenders of the corporate bastion to auctioneers charged with getting the best price for the stockholders at a sale of the company." Accordingly, the board's actions are evaluated in a different frame of reference. In such a context, that conduct can not be judicially reviewed pursuant to the traditional business judgment rule, but instead will be scrutinized for reasonableness in relation to this discrete obligation.

The force of this statement spurred a corporate takeover frenzy, since directors believed that they were compelled to conduct an auction whenever their corporation appeared to be "in play," so as to not violate their fiduciary duties to the shareholders.

Colloquially, the board of a firm that is "in Revlon mode" acquires certain Revlon duties, which requires the firm to be auctioned or sold to the highest bidder.

The Court reached this holding in affirming the issuance by the Delaware Court of Chancery below of a preliminary injunction precluding Revlon, Inc. from consummating a proposed transaction with one of two competing bidders that effectively ended an active and ongoing auction to acquire the company.

== Background ==
=== Facts ===
CEO Ronald Perelman of Pantry Pride approached the Revlon corporation, proposing either a negotiated transaction or, if necessary, a hostile tender offer, at a price of between $42 and $45 per share. Revlon's board rejected the negotiated transaction, fearing that the acquisition would be financed by junk bonds and result in the corporation's dissolution.

To prevent the hostile tender offer, the Revlon board promptly undertook defensive action. Most notably, it adopted a Note Purchase Rights Plan, a variation on the traditional poison pill that, when triggered, resulted in the issuance of debt rather than equity rights to existing shareholders other than the unapproved bidder.

Shortly thereafter, Pantry Pride declared a hostile cash tender offer for any or all Revlon shares at a price of $47.50, subject to its ability to secure financing and to the redemption of the rights issued to shareholders under the newly adopted Rights Plan.

The Revlon board responded by advising shareholders to reject the offer as inadequate, and it commenced its own offer to repurchase about one-third of its own outstanding shares in exchange for senior subordinated notes and convertible preferred stock. The offer was quickly oversubscribed and in exchange for 10 million of its own tendered shares, the company issued notes that contained covenants restricting Revlon's ability to incur debt, sell assets or issue dividends going forward.

The successful consummation of the Revlon repurchase program effectively thwarted Pantry Pride's outstanding tender offer. A few weeks later, however, Pantry Pride issued a new one that, taking into account the completed exchange offer, reflected value essentially equivalent to its first offer. Following rejection of this offer by the Revlon board, Pantry Pride repeatedly revised its offer over the course of the next several weeks, raising the offer price to $50, and later to $53 per share.

During this same period, the Revlon board had commenced discussions with Forstmann, Little regarding a possible leveraged buyout led by Forstmann as an alternative to the acquisition by Pantry Pride. It quickly reached agreement in principle on a transaction at a price of $56. The terms of the proposed deal importantly included a waiver of the restrictive covenants contained in the notes issued by Revlon in the earlier repurchase. The announcement of the proposed deal, and in particular the anticipated waiver of the covenants, sent the trading value of the notes into a steep decline, engendering threats of litigation from now irate noteholders.

Pantry Pride promptly raised the price of its offer to $56.25 per share. It further announced publicly that it would top any ensuing bid that Forstmann might make, if only by a fraction. In light of this, Forstmann expressed reluctance to reenter the bidding without significant assurances from Revlon that any resulting deal would close. The Revlon board assuaged Forstmann's concern. Less than a week following Pantry Pride's $56.25 offer, it struck a deal with Forstmann pursuant to which Forstmann would pay $57.25 per share conditioned on its receipt of a lock-up option to purchase one of Revlon's important business divisions at a discounted price should another acquirer secure 40% or more of Revlon's outstanding stock, a $25 million termination fee, a restrictive no-shop provision precluding the Revlon board from negotiating with Pantry Pride or any other rival bidder except under very narrow circumstances, removal of the Note Purchase Rights, and waiver of the restrictive covenants contained in the recently issued notes. Forstmann for its part agreed to support the par value of the Notes, still falling in value in the market, by exchanging them for new notes, presumably at the initial values of the Notes when they had been first issued.

=== Pantry Pride seeks injunction ===
Pantry Pride raised its offer to $58 per share. Simultaneously, it filed a claim in the Court of Chancery, seeking interim injunctive relief to nullify the asset option, the no-shop, the termination fee and the Rights. It argued that the board had breached its fiduciary duty by foreclosing Revlon stockholders from accepting its higher cash offer.

=== Chancery court ===
The Court of Chancery granted the requested relief, finding the Revlon directors had acted to lock up the Forstmann deal by way of the challenged deal provisions out of concern for their potential liability to Revlon's disaffected and potentially litigious noteholders, a concern that would be allayed by Forstmanns agreement to restore the full value of the notes in connection with the new deal. The Court of Chancery found that, by thus pursuing their personal interests rather than maximizing the sale price for the benefit of the shareholders, the Revlon directors had breached their duty of loyalty.

== Judgment ==
The Delaware Supreme Court affirmed the judgment below.

First, the Court reviewed Pantry Pride's challenges to the Revlon board's defensive actions: the adoption of a poison pill and the consummation of the repurchase program. Referencing its recent decision in Unocal v. Mesa Petroleum, the Court observed initially that the business judgment rule, while generally applicable to a board's approval of a proposed merger, does not apply to a board's decision to implement anti-takeover measures, given the omnipresent specter that the board, in so doing, is serving its own interests in remaining in office at the expense of the interests of shareholders in securing maximum value. Rather, it is the directors' threshold burden to establish that they had a reasonable basis for perceiving the need for defensive actions (typically by showing good faith and reasonable investigation) and that the action taken was reasonable in relation to the threat posed.

Applying this test, the Court found, first, that the Revlon board had acted reasonably and proportionately in adopting the Note Purchase Rights Plan in the face of a demonstrably inadequate offer of $45 per share, particularly since it retained the flexibility to redeem the rights in the event an acceptable offer should later appear and since the effect of such an action was to create bargaining leverage that resulted in significantly more favorable offers. It reached the same conclusion with respect to the exchange offer, for many of the same reasons.

However, a different legal standard applied once the board authorized the negotiations of a merger with Forstmann, the break-up of the company or its sale to one suitor or another became inevitable, and the board clearly recognized that the company was for sale. Now it was no longer charged with protecting the shareholders and the corporate entity from perceived threats to its ability to continue to perform, but instead became obligated to the maximize the company's immediate monetized value for the benefit of shareholders.

It was this new and far more narrow duty that the Revlon directors were found to have violated. By having agreed to structure the most recent Forstmann transaction in a way that effectively destroyed the ongoing bidding contest between Forstmann and Pantry Pride, the Revlon board was held to have acted contrary to its newly acquired, auctioneer-like obligation to pursue and secure the highest purchase price available for shareholders.

The Court was not swayed by defendants' claims that its concessions to Forstmann in fact resulted in a higher price than would otherwise have been available, while simultaneously enhancing the interests of noteholders by shoring up the sagging market for its outstanding notes.

- As to the former, the Court noted that the price ultimately offered by Forstmann was not materially better than what was already on the table from Pantry Pride once the time value of money was taken into account.(Acceptance of the Pantry Pride tender offer would have resulted in immediate payment to the Revlon stockholders. The Forstmann deal contemplated a delay in payment pending shareholder approval and consummation of the merger, thus, in the Courts view, erasing most if not all of the $1 face value difference in price.) Thus, the board ended the auction with very little actual improvement in the final bid.
- As to the claim of having benefitted the noteholders, the Court held that the primary beneficiaries of the decision to lock-up the Forstmann offer were the directors themselves since the primary effect of supporting the notes was to reduce the likelihood of ensuing litigation against them, already threatened, for having depressed the value of the notes by waiving the restrictive covenants. In all events, the Court observed, the interests of noteholders, or any corporate constituency other than stockholders for that matter, are not the proper beneficiaries of a directors fiduciary responsibilities, and may be pursued only to the extent doing so results in a related benefit to stockholders, the only constituency to which such fiduciary responsibilities run under Delaware law. Here, the Court held, the effect of the board's effort to benefit noteholders was contrary to the interests of stockholders in that it resulted in the destruction of an active auction process that promised upon conclusion greater value for stockholders than that secured.

The opinion, written by Justice Andrew G.T. Moore, provides two main passages meant to guide the actions of future boards, regarding when duties attach that lead to enhanced judicial scrutiny. The first of these passages explains that:

When Pantry Pride increased its offer to $50 per share, and then to $53, it became apparent to all that the break-up of the company was inevitable. The Revlon board's authorization permitting management to negotiate a merger [*513] or buyout with a third party was a recognition that the company was for sale. The duty of the board had thus changed from the preservation of Revlon as a corporate entity to the maximization of the company's value at a sale for the stockholders' benefit. This significantly altered the board's responsibilities under the Unocal standards. It no longer faced threats to corporate policy and effectiveness, or to the stockholders' interests, from a grossly inadequate bid. The whole question of defensive measures became moot. The directors' role changed from defenders of the corporate bastion to auctioneers charged with getting the best price for the stockholders at a sale of the company.

[...]

The Revlon board argued that it acted in good faith in protecting the noteholders because Unocal permits consideration of other corporate constituencies ... However, such concern for non-stockholder interests is inappropriate when an auction among active bidders is in progress, and the object no longer is to protect or maintain the corporate enterprise but to sell it to the highest bidder.

The Court also clarified its view of the Unocal Corp. v. Mesa Petroleum Co, that benefits to other groups must be rationally related to shareholders.

A board may have regard for various constituencies in discharging its responsibilities, provided there are rationally related benefits accruing to the stockholders. However, such concern for non-stockholder interests is inappropriate when an auction among active bidders is in progress, and the object no longer is to protect or maintain the corporate enterprise but to sell it to the highest bidder. . . . [A]ny such duties [to consider the noteholders] are limited to the principle that one may not interfere with contractual relationships by improper actions. Here, the rights of the noteholders were fixed by agreement, and there is nothing of substance to suggest that any of those terms were violated. The Notes covenants specifically contemplated a waiver to permit sale of the company at a fair price. The Notes were accepted by the holders on that basis, including the risk of an adverse market effect stemming from a waiver. Thus, nothing remained for Revlon to legitimately protect, and no rationally related benefit thereby accrued to the stockholders. Under such circumstances we must conclude that the merger agreement with Forstmann was unreasonable in relation to the threat posed.

Given that factual and legal backdrop, the court concluded that the Revlon board impermissibly ended the "intense bidding contest on an insubstantial basis." As a result, not only did the board's activities fail the new Revlon standard, but they also failed the Unocal standard.

== Resulting legal framework ==
Today, there are three levels of judicial review when an action is brought under the allegation of a breach of fiduciary duties. As the court in Golden Cycle, LLC v. Allan stated, these levels are: "the deferential business judgment rule, the Unocal or Revlon enhanced scrutiny standard [and] the stringent standard of entire fairness."

The first and most deferential standard, the business judgment rule, has become virtually a rubber-stamp in Delaware corporate law for corporate boards to meet their duty of care. It is the default standard (i.e., the facts must demonstrate why there should be a deviation from this level of review). The business judgment rule provides a rebuttable presumption "that in making a business decision the directors of a corporation acted on an informed basis, in good faith and in the honest belief that the action taken was in the best interests of the company." Thus, at bottom, the business judgment rule reflects little more than process inquiry.

The Unocal and Revlon standards are similar in that they involve a reasonableness inquiry by the court and are triggered by some factual events. The Unocal standard is focused on the erection of defensive tactics by the target board, and involves reasonableness review of legitimate corporate threat and proportionality. The board's case is materially advanced when it can demonstrate that the board was independent, highly informed, and acted in good faith. Revlon duties, on the other hand, are triggered by what may be loosely referred to as a "change in control", and require a general reasonableness standard. This reasonableness standard requires virtually absolute independence of the board, careful attention to the type and scope of information to be considered by the board, good faith negotiation, and a focus on what constitutes the best value for the shareholders. Finding the best value for shareholders may or may not require an auction, depending on the circumstances, and, again, this decision is subjected to a reasonableness inquiry.

The entire fairness standard is triggered "where a majority of the directors approving the transaction were interested or where a majority stockholder stands on both sides of the transaction." Directors can be found to be interested if they "appear on both sides of a transaction [or] expect to derive any personal financial benefit from it in the sense of self-dealing, as opposed to a benefit which devolves upon the corporation or all stockholders generally." Once the entire fairness standard is triggered, the corporate board has the burden to demonstrate that the transaction was inherently fair to the shareholders, by both demonstrating fair dealing (i.e., process) and fair price (i.e., substance).

=== Subsequent debate ===
Subsequent cases such as Paramount v. Time (the Time Warner case) and Paramount v. QVC addressed when a board assumes the Revlon duty to auction the company and forego defensive measures that would otherwise be permissible under Unocal.

Expanding the scope of the intermediate enhanced scrutiny standard of judicial review previously announce in Unocal and Moran v. Household International, Inc., the Revlon opinion gave rise to years of academic debate and decisional law with respect to the events that should be deemed to trigger its application. Even today, questions continue to persist as to the extent to which the doctrine has been absorbed into the traditional duty of care, particularly in connection with so-called ownership transactions such as mergers, and its interplay with the Unocal test traditionally applicable to defensive board action to fend off a hostile acquisition bid, and more recently to deal protection devices contained in merger agreements. See Omnicare v. NCS Healthcare, Inc. 818 A.2d 914 (Del. 2003); compare, e.g., In re Netsmart Technologies, Inc. Shareholders Litigation, 924 A.2d 171 (Del. Ch. 2007). Despite the expanse of precedent that Revlon has engendered in the more than 20 years since its issuance, the Revlon doctrine remains alive, well and surprisingly vague in terms of its scope and its application. Far more certain, however, is the likelihood that as a result of the principles enunciated by the Revlon decision, practitioners can be assured that cash mergers and change of control transactions will engender far closer judicial scrutiny than the broad judicial deference that had been previously regarded as typical and appropriate, as will a board's approval of provisions in merger agreements that unduly restrict the board's ability to entertain more lucrative offers that appear between signing of the merger agreement and its presentation for approval of shareholders. Even actions by independent boards in such circumstances that fail to evidence a reasonable effort and intent to secure the highest and best price reasonably available are likely to invoke searching judicial scrutiny. However, recent Delaware litigation deferred to an independent's board decisions to not engage in negotiations with a competing bidder to try to obtain improved terms after a merger agreement had been signed.

== See also ==
- Fiduciary duty
- Poison pill
- Cheff v. Mathes, 199 A.2d 548 (Del. 1964)
- Paramount v. Time (Del. 1989)
- Unocal Corp. v. Mesa Petroleum Co., 493 A.2d 946 (Del. 1985)
- Weinberger v. UOP, Inc., 457 A.2d 701 (Del. 1983)
