= Paramount Communications, Inc. v. Time Inc. =

- Court: Supreme Court of Delaware
- Citation: 571 A.2d 1140 (Del. 1989)

Case history
- Prior action: Fed. Sec. L. Rep. (CCH) ¶ 94, 514 (Del. Ch. 1989)

Court membership
- Judges sitting: Henry R. Horsey, Andrew G. T. Moore II, Randy J. Holland

Case opinions
- Horsey

Keywords
- Corporate personhood, Fiduciary duty, Hostile takeover, Mergers and acquisitions, Shares

Paramount Communications, Inc. v. Time Inc., C.A. Nos. 10866, 10670, 10935 (Consol.), 1989 Del. Ch. LEXIS 77, Fed. Sec. L. Rep. (CCH) ¶ 94, 514 (Del. Ch. July 14, 1989), aff'd, 571 A.2d 1140 (Del. 1989), is a U.S. corporate law case from Delaware, concerning defensive measures in the mergers and acquisitions context. The Delaware Court of Chancery and the Supreme Court of Delaware upheld the use of defensive measures to advance the long-term goals of the target corporation, where the corporation was not in "Revlon mode".

== Facts ==
Time Inc. and Warner Communications were planning to merge. Time wished to get more into the television business with its HBO channel, and wanted Warner Communications's help. Then, Paramount made an offer to all the shareholders of $200 per share (up from an initial $175). Time shares had been trading at $120. Time had a range of defenses, including a staggered board, a 50-day notice period for any shareholder motion, and a poison pill plan with a 15% trigger. However, with the Paramount threat, Time went further. Initially, the Warner deal was planned as a stock-for-stock merger; in the face of the Paramount threat, Time and Warner directors changed it into a leveraged purchase transaction. The NYSE required that shareholder approval be given for transfers of 20% or more of a corporation's outstanding shares. Therefore, this change in the structure of the transaction meant that existing Time shareholders would not be given a say.

Accordingly, both Paramount and other shareholders sought to enjoin the board from following the merger through (and thwarting Paramount's offer with its cash out option).

== Court of Chancery judgment ==
Chancellor Allen held that the takeover defenses were proportionate to the threat posed to the culture of the company. It followed that the board had not breached its duties.

I note parenthetically that plaintiffs in this suit dismiss this claim of "culture" as being nothing more than a desire to perpetuate or entrench existing management disguised in a pompous, highfalutin' claim. ... I am not persuaded that there may not be instances in which the law might recognize as valid a perceived threat to a "corporate culture" that is shown to be palpable ..., distinctive and advantageous.

...

Many people commit a huge portion of their lives to a single large-scale business organization. They derive their identity in part from that organization and feel that they contribute to the identity of the firm. The mission of the firm is not seen by those involved with it as wholly economic, nor the continued existence of its distinctive identity as a matter of indifference.

...

[W]here the board ... continues to manage the corporation for long-term profit pursuant to a preexisting business plan that itself is not primarily a control device or scheme, the corporation has a legally cognizable interest in achieving that plan.

...

Reasonable persons can and do disagree as to whether it is the better course from the shareholders' point of view collectively to cash out their stake in the company now at this (or a higher) premium cash price. However, there is no persuasive evidence that the board of Time has a corrupt or venal motivation in electing to continue with its long-term plan even in the face of the cost that that course will no doubt entail for the company's shareholders in the short run.

== Supreme Court judgment ==
On appeal to the Supreme Court of Delaware, Justice Henry Horsey affirmed the outcome reached by the Court of Chancery, on partly different grounds: that the target corporation did not face "breakup", a condition necessary at the time to invoke Revlon duties.

Delaware law imposes on a board of directors the duty to manage the business and affairs of the corporation. 8 Del. C. § 141(a). This broad mandate includes a conferred authority to set a corporate course of action, including time frame, designed to enhance corporate profitability. ... [D]irectors, generally, are obliged to charter a course for a corporation which is in its best interest without regard to a fixed investment horizon. ... [A]bsent a limited set of circumstances as defined under Revlon, a board of directors, while always required to act in an informed manner, is not under any per se duty to maximize shareholder value in the short term, even in the context of a takeover. In our view, the pivotal question presented by this case is: "Did Time, by entering into the proposed merger with Warner, put itself up for sale?"

...

[W]e remise our rejection of plaintiffs' Revlon claim on different grounds, namely, the absence of any substantial evidence to conclude that Time's board, in negotiating with Warner, made the dissolution or breakup of the corporate entity inevitable, as was the case in Revlon.

Under Delaware law there are, generally speaking and without excluding other possibilities, two circumstances which may implicate Revlon duties. The first, and clearer one, is when a corporation initiates an active bidding process seeking to sell itself or to effect a business reorganization involving a clear break-up of the company. ... However, Revlon duties may also be triggered where, in response to a bidder's offer, a target abandons its long-term strategy and seeks an alternative transaction also involving the breakup of the company. ... If, however, the board's reaction to a hostile tender offer is found to constitute only a defensive response and not an abandonment of the corporation's continued existence, Revlon duties are not triggered, though Unocal duties attach.

The "breakup" test for crossing the Revlon threshold was later replaced with the "fundamental change" test, which encompasses both breakup and change of control, in the 1994 case of Paramount Communications, Inc. v. QVC Network, Inc..

== See also ==
- United States corporate law
