= Aronson v. Lewis =

- Court: Delaware Supreme Court
- Decided: March 1, 1984
- Citation: 473 A.2d 805

Court membership
- Judges sitting: John J. McNeilly, Andrew G. T. Moore II, Andrew D. Christie

Case opinions
- Decision by: Moore

Keywords
- Directors' duties; business judgment rule

Aronson v Lewis, 473 A.2d 805 (Del. 1984), is a US corporate law case, from Delaware concerning the possibility of a shareholder to bring a derivative suit.

== Facts ==
A shareholder claimed that the directors of Meyers Parking System Inc. had improperly wasted corporate assets. The CEO, Mr Fink, then 75 years old, was also a 47% shareholder and its founder. It was alleged he personally selected the other directors. They had given to Mr Fink a generous five year employment contract, a subsequent term as a consultant with a large salary, and an annual bonus equal to 5% of the company's pre tax profits. The contract also said that this continued regardless of Mr Fink's continued ability to perform the job.

== Judgment ==
Justice Moore rejected the claim on the ground that the plaintiff had not shown that making a demand on the board would have been futile. He held that the 'business judgment rule' was applicable. This meant,

a presumption that in making a business decision, the directors of a corporation acted on an informed basis in good faith and in the honest belief that the action was taken in the best interests of the company.

== See also ==
- United States corporate law
- UK company law
