= Smith v. Van Gorkom =

United States corporate law case

- Court: Supreme Court of Delaware
- Full case name: Alden Smith and John W. Gosselin v. Jerome W. Van Gorkom, Bruce S. Chelberg, William B. Johnson, Joseph B. Lanterman, Graham J. Morgan, Thomas P. O'Boyle, W. Allen Wallis, Sidney H. Bonser, William D. Browder, Trans Union Corporation, a Delaware corporation, Marmon Group, Inc., a Delaware corporation, GL Corporation, a Delaware corporation, and New T. Co., a Delaware corporation
- Decided: January 29, 1985
- Citation: 488 A.2d 858 (Del. 1985)

Holding
- The Board of Directors did not reach an informed business judgment because they did not adequately inform themselves, were uninformed as to the intrinsic value of the Company and were grossly negligent in approving the "sale" of the Company upon two hours' consideration; therefore, the business judgment rule provides no protection.

Court membership
- Judges sitting: Daniel L. Herrmann, John J. McNeilly, Jr., Henry R. Horsey, Andrew G.T. Moore II, Andrew D. Christie

Case opinions
- Majority: Horsey; Dissent: McNeilly; Dissent: Christie

Smith v. Van Gorkom 488 A.2d 858 (Del. 1985) is a United States corporate law case of the Delaware Supreme Court, discussing a director's duty of care. It is often called the "Trans Union case". Van Gorkom is sometimes referred to as the most important case regarding business organizations because it shows a unique scenario when the board is found liable even after applying the business judgment rule. The decision "stripped corporate directors and officers of the protective cloak formerly provided by the business judgment rule, rendering them liable for the tort of gross negligence for the violation of their duties under the rule."

== Facts ==
The case involved a proposed leveraged buy-out merger of TransUnion by Marmon Group which was controlled by Jay Pritzker. Defendant Jerome W. Van Gorkom, who was TransUnion's chairman and CEO, chose a proposed price of $55 without consultation with outside financial experts. He only consulted with the company's CFO, and that consultation was to determine a per share price that would work for a leveraged buyout. Van Gorkom and the CFO did not determine an actual total value of the company. The board approved the sale of TransUnion because it suffered accelerated depreciation and a reduced income; in other words, it had more tax credits than income. The court was highly critical of this decision, writing that "the record is devoid of any competent evidence that $55 represented the per share intrinsic value of the Company."

The proposed merger was subject to Board approval. At the Board meeting, a number of items were not disclosed, including the problematic methodology that Van Gorkom used to arrive at the proposed price. Also, previous objections by management were not discussed. The Board approved the proposal.

== Judgment ==
=== Majority ===
The Court found that the directors were grossly negligent, because they quickly approved the merger without substantial inquiry or any expert advice. For this reason, the board of directors breached the duty of care that it owed to the corporation's shareholders. As such, the protection of the business judgment rule was unavailable.

The Court stated,

The rule itself "is a presumption that in making a business decision, the directors of a corporation acted on an informed basis, in good faith and in the honest belief that the action taken was in the best interests of the company." ... Thus, the party attacking a board decision as uninformed must rebut the presumption that its business judgment was an informed one.

488 A.2d at 872. Furthermore, the court rejected defendant's argument that the substantial premium paid over the market price indicated that it was a good deal. In so doing, the court noted the irony that the board stated that the decision to accept the offer was based on their expertise, while at the same time asserting that it was proper because the price offered was a large premium above market value.

The decision also clarified the directors' duty of disclosure, stating that corporate directors must disclose all facts germane to a transaction that is subject to a shareholder vote.

=== Dissent ===
Justices McNeilly and Christie wrote dissenting opinions. McNeilly hotly dissented, calling the majority's opinion a "comedy of errors," and saying it "reads like an advocate's closing address to a hostile jury. And I say that not lightly."

Particularly, McNeilly argues the facts show the board made an informed decision:

I have no quarrel with the majority's analysis of the business judgment rule. It is the application of that rule to these facts which is wrong. An overview of the entire record, rather than the limited view of bits and pieces which the majority has exploded like popcorn, convinces me that the directors made an informed business judgment which was buttressed by their test of the market.

Christie also argues the business judgment rule protects the board in this case.

== Significance ==
The case prompted an outcry from boards of directors of public companies, a sharp increase in insurance premiums for directors and officers' insurance, and the eventual adoption by the Delaware legislature of Delaware General Corporation Law §102(b)(7) as extracted below. This permits Delaware companies (with shareholder approval) to adopt charter amendments that exculpate directors from personal liability for breaches of the duty of care.

(7) A provision eliminating or limiting the personal liability of a director to the corporation or its stockholders for monetary damages for breach of fiduciary duty as a director, provided that such provision shall not eliminate or limit the liability of a director: (i) For any breach of the director's duty of loyalty to the corporation or its stockholders; (ii) for acts or omissions not in good faith or which involve intentional misconduct or a knowing violation of law; (iii) under § 174 of this title; or (iv) for any transaction from which the director derived an improper personal benefit. No such provision shall eliminate or limit the liability of a director for any act or omission occurring prior to the date when such provision becomes effective. All references in this paragraph to a director shall also be deemed to refer (x) to a member of the governing body of a corporation which is not authorized to issue capital stock, and (y) to such other person or persons, if any, who, pursuant to a provision of the certificate of incorporation in accordance with § 141(a) of this title, exercise or perform any of the powers or duties otherwise conferred or imposed upon the board of directors by this title.

The vast majority of Delaware corporations now have a 102(b)(7) provision in their certificate of incorporation. Nevertheless, the case lives on as a reminder that directors should take reasonable actions to inform themselves before acting.

After the court's decision to remand the case back to the Court of Chancery the defendants agreed to a settlement. The directors agreed to pay $23.5 million in damages, of which $10 million was covered by insurance with Pritzker then paying the remainder of the settlement even though he was not a party to the lawsuit. Pritzker paid as he did not agree with the court and some of the defendants were unable to pay the settlement.

Ultimately, the main significance of the Trans Union case is that fairness opinions, typically provided by investment banks, are effectively now a legal requirement of any public company merger.

=== Criticism ===
Daniel Fischel, a leading scholar in the regulation of corporations, described the Smith v. Van Gorkom opinion as "one of the worst decisions in the history of corporate law." This criticism stems in part from the fact that the court made independent directors potentially liable for millions of dollars in damages for selling a company for approximately a 60% premium to its market value. Such liability provides a strong disincentive for the best potential directors to serve on the board, and one would expect such a disincentive to result in worse corporate governance. The decision has also been derided as the "Investment Banker's Relief Act of 1985" because of all the business it has generated for investment bankers from boards seeking to avoid liability or other legal entanglements.

== See also ==
- Pritzker family
- US corporate law
