= Weinberger v. UOP, Inc. =

- Court: Supreme Court of Delaware
- Decided: February 1, 1983
- Citation: 457 A.2d 701

Court membership
- Judges sitting: Daniel L. Herrmann, John J. McNeilly, William T. Quillen, Henry R. Horsey, Andrew G. T. Moore II

Case opinions
- Decision by: Moore

Keywords
- Directors' duties

Weinberger v. UOP, Inc., 457 A.2d 701 (Del. 1983), is a case concerning United States corporate law in the context of mergers and "squeeze outs".

In Delaware squeeze-out mergers are subject to a two prong entire fairness test. The test focuses on the fairness of both the transaction's price and the process of approval. The two prongs are fair price and fair dealing.

== Facts ==
In 1974, Signal Companies, Inc. acquired 50.5% of UOP, Inc.'s outstanding shares. At this time, Signal nominated and elected six of the thirteen directors on UOP's board.

In 1977, Signal became interested in acquiring the rest of UOP at any price up to $24 per share. Signal received a fairness opinion from Lehman Brothers, stating that $21 per share was a fair price, although the fairness opinion may have been based upon hasty and incomplete review. Signal's board unanimously voted to propose a merger at $21 per share. Upon receiving this offer, UOP's board urged the shareholders to approve the merger. The merger was approved and became effective in May, 1978.

Plaintiff brought a class action on behalf of the minority shareholders of UOP, challenging the fairness of the merger agreement.

== Judgment ==
The Court held that in long-form freeze-out mergers, defendants have the burden of satisfying the Entire Fairness Test. This test has two prongs: fair dealing and fair price.

- Fair dealing concerns the procedures of the deal: how and when it was initiated, where it was negotiated, and how it was approved. The duty of loyalty, as manifested by a showing of good faith and candor, is inherent to fair dealing. When directors or controlling shareholders are on both sides of the transaction, it is difficult to show that the transaction is indeed one at arm's length. Directors can try to meet their burden by setting up an independent negotiating committee of outside directors.
- Fair price concerns the terms of the deal. To determine whether there was a fair price, all relevant factors that may affect a company's stock value are considered.

The Court also dismissed the relevance of the need for defendants to satisfy the business purpose test. Given the strength of the exclusive appraisal remedy and the high standard of showing entire fairness, the business purpose test does not afford "any additional meaningful protection" to minority shareholders.

== Significance ==
At the time, Weinberger marked an improvement in judicial treatment of minority shareholders involved in freeze out mergers. This improvement was a result of the court's elimination of the business purpose test. This directed the court's attention to the twin components of the entire fairness standard — fair dealing and fair price — which in turn directs its attention to the treatment of minority shareholders. With this change came an improved method for appraisal of judicial remedies for minority shareholders: "the Weinberger court improved the effectiveness of the appraisal remedy by allowing the use of modern valuation techniques in future appraisal proceedings. The use of such techniques in appraisal proceedings will serve to guarantee that former shareholders receive fair value for the shares expropriated from them." Weinberger also arguably improved "the state of Delaware merger law from management's point."

== See also ==
- US corporate law
- Cheff v. Mathes
