= Hogg v Cramphorn Ltd =

UK company law case on director liability

- Court: High Court
- Citation: [1967] Ch 254

Case opinions
- Buckley J

Keywords
- Takeover, proper purpose

Hogg v Cramphorn Ltd [1967] Ch 254 is a famous UK company law case on director liability. The Court held that corporate directors who dilute the value of the stock in order to prevent a hostile takeover (the poison pill) are breaching their fiduciary duty to the company.

== Facts ==
Mr Baxter approached the board of directors of Cramphorn Ltd. to make a takeover offer for the company. The directors (including Colonel Cramphorn who was managing director and chairman) believed that the takeover would be bad for the company, so they issued 5707 shares with ten votes each to the trustees of the employee’s welfare scheme (Cramphorn, an employee and the auditor). This meant they could outvote Baxter's bid for majority control. A shareholder, Mr Hogg, sued, alleging the issue of the shares was ultra vires. Cramphorn argued that the directors' actions were all in good faith. It was feared that Mr Baxter would sack many of the workers.

== Judgment ==
Buckley J, giving the judgment of the court, held that the new shares issued by the directors were invalid. The directors violated their duties as directors by issuing shares for the purpose of preventing the takeover. The power to issue shares creates a fiduciary duty and must only be exercised in order to raise capital and not for any other purposes such as to prevent a takeover. The act could not be justified on the basis that the directors honestly believed that it would be in the best interest of the company. The improper issuance of shares could only be made valid if the decision was ratified by the shareholders at a general meeting, with no votes allowed to the newly issued shares.

== See also ==
- Cheff v. Mathes, 199 A.2d 548 (Del. 1964)
- Howard Smith Ltd v Ampol Ltd [1974] AC 832.
- Criterion Properties plc v Stratford UK Properties LLC [2004] UKHL 28
- Board of directors#"Proper purpose"
