= Daniel L. Herrmann =

American judge (1913–1991)

Chief Justice of the Delaware Supreme Court
- In office August 9, 1973 – July 31, 1985
- Nominated by: Sherman W. Tribbitt
- Preceded by: Daniel F. Wolcott
- Succeeded by: Andrew D. Christie

Justice of the Delaware Supreme Court
- In office December 13, 1964 – August 8, 1973
- Succeeded by: William Duffy

Judge of the Delaware Superior Court
- In office January 12, 1951 – April 15, 1958
- Nominated by: Governor Elbert N. Carvel

Personal details
- Born: Daniel L. Herrmann; June 10, 1913 New York, New York
- Died: June 2, 1991 (aged 77) Philadelphia, Pennsylvania, U.S.
- Cause of death: heart attack
- Spouse(s): Millicent "Mitzi" Herrmann (m. 1985–1991) Zelda Kluger (m. 1940; died 1980)
- Children: Richard, Stephen
- Education: University of Delaware; Georgetown University Law Center

Daniel Lionel Herrmann (June 10, 1913 – June 2, 1991) was an American lawyer, professor and community leader who served as a justice of the Delaware Supreme Court from 1964 to 1973 and chief justice from 1973 to 1985. Herrmann was known for his contributions to judicial reform and was the first Jewish judge in Delaware.

== Early life and career ==
Herrmann was born on June 10, 1913, in New York City. When he was two, he and his family moved to Wilmington, Delaware. Herrmann graduated from Wilmington High School in 1931, the University of Delaware in 1935 and the Georgetown University Law Center in 1939.

Herrmann's first legal job after passing the bar was for Wilmington attorney Steward Lynch, for whom he worked until enlisting in the United States Army in 1942. In 1946, he was discharged as a major and served as an Assistant United States Attorney for three years until he was appointed to the Delaware Superior Court by Governor Elbert N. Carvel, taking office on January 12, 1951. Because the compensation was too low to pay for his sons' education, Herrmann resigned from that seat on April 15, 1958, to return to private practice with colleague William Duffy. In 1961, he made partner at Herrmann, Bayard, Brill & Russell and represented the State of Delaware in its acquisition of property for Interstate 95.

== Delaware Supreme Court ==
On December 13, 1964, Carvel nominated Herrmann to succeed Chief Justice Charles L. Terry, Jr., but this move was strongly opposed by supporters of Daniel F. Wolcott, who instead received the appointment, with Herrmann becoming a justice. However, there was no opposition when Governor Sherman W. Tribbitt nominated Herrmann to succeed Wolcott, on August 9, 1973. Herrmann served in that capacity until his retirement, on July 31, 1985.

=== Judicial reform ===
During his twelve-year tenure, Herrmann was an advocate of modifying and uniting the courts of Delaware.

By 1978, the State of Delaware had a sharp increase in case filings and the waiting period between a civil case briefing and the time it was taken under submission by the court. Also, the Delaware Supreme Court was the only court of last resort in the United States with fewer than five members. In his June State of the Judiciary Address (which he established for chief justices), Herrmann called attention to the expansion of the Delaware Supreme Court. In October, the court expanded from three justices to five when Governor Pierre S. du Pont IV announced that William T. Quillen and Henry R. Horsey would fill the two additional seats.

Herrmann's other court reform achievements include: initiating a yearly report on the state of the judiciary; prioritizing the disposition of criminal cases; ensuring that all judicial opinions show the time period between submission and decision; enlarging courthouse facilities; installing computer-based information systems; additional judge appointments and administrative personnel; increasing judicial compensation; establishing the Long Range Courts Planning Committee, Delaware Judicial Nominating Commission and Office of Disciplinary Counsel; amending the rules of the courts; creating public education programs concerning Delaware's legal system; and opening the Delaware Supreme Court to photographic and news coverage, all of which facilitated more uniformity within the State's system.

=== Notable cases ===
Herrmann and the court's opinion in Weinberger v. UOP, Inc. (1983) held that the terms of a cash-out merger must meet the test of fairness: a fair transaction price based on the stock price of the company for sale and fair dealing, or fair merger proceedings, in which fiduciary duty is upheld.

In the 1985 corporate law case Smith v. Van Gorkom, the court held that a business is not protected under the business judgment rule if its directors neglect to make informed business decisions, thus breaching their fiduciary duty under Delaware corporate law. The landmark decision was met with criticism nationwide.

== Personal life ==
In 1940, Herrmann married Zelda Kluger, with whom he was an active leader of the Jewish community. They had two sons: Stephen and Richard. Three days after their 40th wedding anniversary, Zelda died of cancer at the General Division Hospital. In 1985, Herrmann married Millicent "Mitzi" Herrmann.

== Retirement and death ==
After retiring from his role as chief justice, Herrmann became a distinguished visiting professor at the Widener University School of Law. The new courses he created aimed to teach law students alternative procedures for resolving disputes and how to be better advocates in appellate court proceedings.

Herrmann died suddenly from a heart attack in the Philadelphia International Airport in 1991. In 1996, the New Castle County Courthouse was renamed the Daniel L. Herrmann Courthouse in his honor. After the courts moved to a newly constructed courthouse the old courthouse was sold to a credit card company and his name was removed from the building.

== See also ==
- List of Jewish American jurists
