= Paramount Communications, Inc. v. QVC Network, Inc. =

- Court: Supreme Court of Delaware
- Full case name: Paramount Communications, Inc., Viacom Inc., Martin S. Davis, Grace J. Fippinger, Irving R. Fischer, Benjamin L. Hooks, Franz J. Lutolf, James A. Pattson, Irwin Schloss, Samuel J. Silberman, Lawrence M. Small, and George Weissman v. QVC Network Inc. (In re Paramount Communications Inc. Shareholders' Litigation)
- Decided: February 4, 1994
- Citation: 637 A.2d 34 (Del. 1994)

Court membership
- Judges sitting: E. Norman Veasey, Chief Justice, Andrew G. T. Moore II & Randy J. Holland, Justices

In Paramount Communications, Inc. v. QVC Network, Inc., 637 A.2d 34 (Del. 1994), the Delaware Supreme Court clarified the type of transaction that triggers Revlon duties.

== Facts ==
This case, an appeal from a decision of the Delaware Chancery Court, involved a proposed merger between Viacom and Paramount Communications; as part of the merger agreement, Paramount agreed to an array of defensive measures, including a no-shop provision, $100 million termination fee and a lock-up option on approximately 20% of Paramount’s common stock. However, QVC intervened with its own, facially more generous merger proposal, conditioned on cancellation of the defensive measures. The Paramount board refused to conduct a formal bidding process with QVC on the grounds that it would be inconsistent with its contractual obligations to Viacom.

The court found that,

The sale of control in this case, which is at the heart of the proposed strategic alliance, implicates enhanced judicial scrutiny of the conduct of the Paramount Board under Unocal Corp. v. Mesa Petroleum Co., Del. Supr., 493 A.2d 946 (1985), and Revlon, Inc. v. MacAndrews & Forbes Holdings, Inc., Del.Supr., 506 A.2d 173 (1986). (The "Revlon" decision.)

== Holding ==
Revlon triggers
When a corporation undertakes a transaction which will cause (a) a change in corporate control, or (b) a break-up of the corporate entity, the directors' obligation is to seek the best value reasonably available to the stockholders

Burden of proof
The "directors have the burden of proving that they were adequately informed and acted reasonably."

Key features of the enhanced scrutiny test
The courts will look into the adequacy of the directors’ decision making process, including what information they used in coming to their decision. In addition, the court will consider the reasonableness of the directors’ action in light of the circumstances then existing.

== See also ==
- Buchwald v. Paramount
- Leibovitz v. Paramount Pictures Corp.
- United States v. Paramount Pictures, Inc.
