= Unocal Corp. v. Mesa Petroleum Co. =

1985 Delaware Supreme Court case

- Court: Supreme Court of Delaware
- Full case name: Unocal Corporation, a Delaware corporation v. Mesa Petroleum Co., a Delaware corporation, Mesa Asset Co., a Delaware corporation, Mesa Eastern, Inc., a Delaware corporation, and Mesa Partners II, a Texas partnership
- Decided: May 17, 1985 (oral decision); June 10, 1985 (written opinion)
- Citation: 493 A.2d 946 (Del. 1985)

Court membership
- Judges sitting: John J. McNeilly, Jr., Andrew G.T. Moore II, Justices, and Taylor, Judge

Unocal v. Mesa Petroleum Co., 493 A.2d 946 (Del. 1985) is a landmark decision of the Delaware Supreme Court on corporate defensive tactics against take-over bids.

Until the Unocal decision in 1985, the Delaware courts had applied the business judgment rule, when appropriate, to takeover defenses, mergers, and sales.

In Unocal, the Court held that a board of directors may only try to prevent a take-over where it can be shown that there was a threat to corporate policy and the defensive measure adopted was proportional and reasonable given the nature of the threat.

This requirement has become known as the Unocal test for board of directors (as later modified in Unitrin, Inc. v. American General Corp., which required the tactics to be "coercive" or "preclusive" before the court would step in).

== Facts ==
Mesa Petroleum had made a front-end loaded two-tiered hostile bid for Unocal Corporation in which the front end was $54 in cash, and the back end of the deal was $54 in junk bonds. Because most shareholders would prefer to receive the cash instead of the bonds, shareholders were expected to tender their shares into the deal, even if they did not think $54 was a fair price. If a shareholder declined to tender, that shareholder risked being cashed-out for $54 in risky debt instruments instead of cash.

In response to the Mesa tender offer, Unocal made a self-tender at $72 for all but the Mesa shares. The Unocal board attempted to launch a self-tender offer to combat an unsolicited tender offer by Mesa Petroleum (Mesa). The self-tender offer would be triggered upon Mesa acquiring sixty-four million shares of Unocal, and would mean that Unocal itself would buy-back 49% of the outstanding shares of Unocal - but none of the shares to be bought-back could be shares held by Mesa.

== Judgment ==
=== Court of Chancery ===
The trial court found that this selective exchange offer was not legally permissible, and issued a preliminary injunction against the use of the self-tender offer defense.

=== Supreme Court ===
The Delaware Supreme Court reversed the trial court. It found that the Unocal's board of directors had reasonable grounds for believing that a danger to corporate policy or effectiveness existed and that the response was reasonable in relation to the threat posed. This reasonable relation analysis permitted an analysis of the price, nature, and timing of the offer as well as the impact on shareholders, creditors, customers, employees, and the community. The key part of the judgment said this:

If a defensive measure is to come within the ambit of the business judgment rule, it must be reasonable in relation to the threat posed. This entails an analysis by the directors of the nature of the takeover bid and its effect on the corporate enterprise. Examples of such concerns may include: inadequacy of the price offered, nature and timing of the offer, questions of illegality, the impact on “constituencies” other than shareholders (i.e., creditors, customers, employees, and perhaps even the community generally), the risk of nonconsummation, and the quality of securities being offered in the exchange. While not a controlling factor, it also seems to us that a board may reasonably consider the basic stockholder interests at stake, including those of short term speculators, whose actions may have fueled the coercive aspect of the offer at the expense of the long term investor.

The Unocal test the court established in this case to determine whether directors may try to prevent a take-over is a two pronged test. The two prongs include:

- First, did the directors reasonably perceive a threat? And,
- Second, was the directors' defensive measure reasonable in relation to the threat posed?

== Significance ==
The significance of the opinion flows from the court's premise that, due to the inherent conflict of interest involved, takeover defenses pose a significant danger to shareholders. In essence, the Unocal court feared that a board may use takeover defenses to impermissibly prevent threats to corporate policy or to the board's control over the corporation. As a result, there was a need for "an enhanced duty" on the board, so as to ensure that their decisions in this area were meant only to further the welfare of the corporation and its shareholders. Therefore, the court ruled that in order for the board to be allotted the protection of the business judgment rule, the board must demonstrate that it was responding to a legitimate threat to corporate policy and effectiveness, and that its actions were "reasonable in relation to the threat posed."

However, the permission to consider other constituencies besides the shareholders was curtailed in Revlon v. MacAndrews.

Whereas Cheff v. Mathes had sanctioned greenmail, or payment to the raider to go away, in Unocal the court sanctioned reverse greenmail, or payment to shareholders excluding the raider.

== See also ==
- US corporate law
- Unocal Corporation
- Cheff v. Mathes (1964)
- Moran v. Household International, Inc. (1985)
- Revlon, Inc. v. MacAndrews & Forbes Holdings, Inc. (1986); Revlon Moment
- Paramount v. Time (1989)
- Criterion Properties plc v Stratford UK Properties LLC (2004)
