= QVC =

American television network

- Country: United States
- Broadcast area: United States, reaching bordering regions via overspill of the American terrestrial network
- Headquarters: 1200 Wilson Drive, West Chester, Pennsylvania 19380

Programming
- Language: English
- Picture format: 2160p UHDTV; 1080i HDTV (downscaled to letterboxed 480i for the SDTV feed)

Ownership
- Owner: QVC Group
- Sister channels: (see below)

History
- Launched: November 24, 1986; 39 years ago

Links
- Website: qvc.com

Availability

Terrestrial
- ABC Owned Television Stations: -DT4 channel position; list of stations
- Over-the-air as a subchannel: Consult local listings

Streaming media
- QVC: Live Stream
- Apple TV & Amazon Fire TV: QVC app (all QVC networks)
- Roku: QVC/HSN app (all QVC & HSN networks)
- Frndly TV: Internet Protocol television

QVC (short for "Quality, Value, Convenience") is an American free-to-air television network and a flagship shopping channel specializing in televised home shopping, owned by QVC Group (formerly Qurate Retail Group). It was founded in 1986 by Joseph Segel in West Chester, Pennsylvania, United States. The group broadcasts to more than 350 million households in seven countries, having QVC channels also in the UK, Germany, Japan, and Italy, along with a joint venture in China with China National Radio called CNR Mall.

In 2024, the total revenue for the year was $10 billion.

As of December 2013, Halo2Cloud holds the network's record for most units sold in a day of 380,000 chargers with total sales reaching $19 million.

== History ==
=== Early era (1986–1992) ===
==== QVC's founding and television launch ====
QVC was founded on June 13, 1986, by Joseph Segel and investors including Ralph Roberts, the founder and chairperson of Comcast. Roberts was able to arrange deals in which cable companies received investment stakes in QVC in exchange for carrying the channel. Sears was one of the first brands that QVC would represent, with a two-year exclusive agreement to sell Sears products through television shopping. The corporation later set a new record for first full-year fiscal sales for a new public company of $112 million. The channel was launched on November 24, 1986, with program hosts Kathy Levine, John Eastman, Ellen Langas, Bob Bowersox, Cindy Briggs-Moore, Molly Daley and Marty Jacobs. Each November 24, QVC celebrated their birthday annually through 2008. Initially broadcasting live from 7:30 p.m. until midnight ET each weekday and 24 hours a day each weekend, the channel extended its live programming to 24/7/364 in January 1987. Former QUBE host and producer, Ron Giles, was named an executive vice president and executive producer at QVC in late 1987. In October 1988, the board of directors elected Michael C. Boyd to the position of senior executive vice president and chief operating officer. In early 1990, Boyd would take the title of president, reportedly to relieve some of Segel's load.

==== Competitor buy-out attempts ====
In July 1989, QVC acquired the Cable Value Network, founded by Irwin L. Jacobs. The $380 million deal contributed to a loss of $17 million during the next fiscal quarter, and then led to difficulties in the couple of years that followed.

QVC first offered to buy out the Burbank-based Shop Television Network on March 16, 1991, a bid rejected by its producers and the Los Angeles Superior Court, and which carried blocks of time offering JCPenney merchandise. On May 21, 1991, it acquired the channel and its 4 million subscribers, with a liability of $2 million to its producers, along with a license to carry JCPenney brands on-air.

A QVC offer to buy rival Home Shopping Network in March 1992 was sidetracked by antitrust concerns. On July 12, 1993, QVC offered to acquire Home Shopping in a stock swap valued at about $1.1 billion, but talks faltered when QVC pursued a bid for Paramount in fall 1993. Liberty Media Corp. held a controlling interest in the St. Petersburg, Florida-based Home Shopping Network along with their share of QVC.

=== Barry Diller, use of QVC for corporate raider attempts (1993–1995) ===
==== Diller's takeover and failure of Q2 ====
Introduced to televised shopping by designer Diane von Fürstenberg a decade before their marriage, Fox founder Barry Diller pursued slick "infotainment"-style programming as his next television venture. After resigning as chairman of Fox Inc. in early 1992, Diller's Arrow Investments purchased a $25 million stake in QVC, or just under 3 percent of the company, in December 1992 and Diller succeeded Segel as chairman and chief executive on January 18, 1993.

Diller, known for building Fox as a fourth national television network in just five years, replaced QVC's second channel, The Fashion Channel, with Q2. Debuting in spring 1994, Q2 was aimed at younger, more economic shoppers, and broadcast from New York City. The spin-off network was shelved in 1996, costing QVC $55 million.

==== Failed Paramount takeover bid ====
QVC, under Diller, first placed a hostile $9.6 billion bid for Paramount in September 1993, when talks for a friendly merger between Paramount and Viacom, worth $7.2 billion at the time, were already under way. QVC's more attractive bid was forced on Paramount in the February 4, 1994 decision of Paramount Communications, Inc. v. QVC Network, Inc. by the Delaware Supreme Court. Following Viacom's merger with Blockbuster that gave Viacom the financial lead, Diller proposed that QVC financial backer BellSouth could buy QVC shares after the merger to boost the value of QVC's stock to Paramount shareholders. Diller dropped the proposal when reminded of its legal challenges and on February 14, 1994, QVC lost its bid for Paramount to a $9.85 billion bid from Viacom. Diller's reported five-word response to the end of what The Los Angeles Times called "the biggest takeover war of the 1990s" was: "They won. We lost. Next."

==== Worldwide reach ====
Diller changed the name of QVC Network to QVC, Inc. in 1994, while creating a holding company to allow the firm to diversify and build assets and divisions separately. Among the changes were the creation of two new divisions, Q Direct, to produce infomercials and 60- and 120-second direct response TV commercials, and QVC Interactive, an online-shopping service. QVC launched their internet shopping site, iQVC, on September 15, 1996.

QVC's shopping channel based in Mexico, airing in non-primetime programming hours on Canal 4, launched November 1, 1993 in a partnership with Televisa, and known domestically as CVC (a Spanish translation of the network's full name). The operation closed on August 4, 1995, after the devaluation of the Mexican peso during a monetary transition, and a general national loathing of long-form home shopping and paid programming content.

=== QVC's rise (1995–2005) ===
On September 29, 1994, QVC Vice President Douglas Briggs unveiled the QVC Local, a customized, $1.7 million state-of-the-art television studio in a bus, in Washington, D.C. In January 1995, QVC kicked off the "Quest for America's Best: 50 in 50 Tour," a 50-week nationwide product search to promote local and regional products with live broadcasts from every State. The QVC Local traveled 88,796 miles of American road during the 50 in 50 Tour in 1995.

Comcast and TCI spin-off company Liberty Media completed their acquisition of the company on February 2, 1995, and Diller resigned. Douglas S. Briggs was announced as QVC Inc. CEO on March 6, 1995, after overseeing the daily business of the company as president of QVC electronic retailing and executive vice president of QVC Inc. since February 1994. Briggs was tasked with boosting Diller's many start-up ventures, including QVC UK and Q2.

On September 24, 1997, at 7pm ET, QVC signed off their live broadcast from their previous studio and celebrated the opening of their new broadcast center and corporate offices, Studio Park, a nearly 17-acre property with more than 58,000 square feet of filming studios in West Chester, Pennsylvania.

QVC tested a retail concept in 2000 at The Mall of America in Bloomington, Minnesota with a limited-term lease on a 500 square-foot store. The next year, QVC signed a ten-year lease on a 2,500 square-foot store with broadcasting capabilities and opened QVC @ The Mall on August 8, 2001. The Mall of America store remained the only location for this format and the store closed at the conclusion of the ten-year lease on March 22, 2011.

==== Legal hurdles and Comcast's exit ====
In 1998, two former hosts filed a class-action lawsuit against QVC, claiming that they were discriminated against by the shopping channel based on their race. The lawsuit went on to state that QVC refused to allow non-white hosts any permanent daytime/primetime spots, which relegated them to the overnight hours, otherwise known as the "graveyard shift." Because of this, the non-white hosts were paid considerably less than the white hosts.

On July 3, 2003, Comcast sold its majority share to Liberty Media, which purchased the remaining 56.5% of QVC it didn't already own for $7.9 billion. Comcast, for which QVC was a financial asset, not a strategic one, continued to carry QVC for its 21 million cable subscribers.

On Wednesday, March 24, 2004, the FTC sued QVC over violating a June 2000 order barring the company from making misleading claims about dietary supplements. A March 2009 settlement with the FTC charged QVC with paying $6 million for consumer redress and a $1.5 million civil penalty and for QVC to discontinue the dietary supplements products.

=== Move towards e-commerce (2006–2021) ===
CEO Douglas Briggs announced his retirement in April 2005 and on November 1, 2005, Michael A. George, who previously served as chief marketing officer and general manager of the U.S. consumer business at Dell Inc, was named successor. George was named QVC CEO on April 15, 2006.

On September 23, 2007, QVC U.S. rebranded itself, changing its logo on-air and online. The rebranding was accompanied by an advertising campaign with the tagline "iQdoU?" ("I shop QVC, do you?") that had preceded the rebrand with billboards in major U.S. cities. The iQdoU? campaign also included a "teaser" website.

On September 30, 2010, at 11 p.m., QVC began broadcasting in Italy, both on satellite and through digital terrestrial television. In 2012, QVC partnered with China National Radio to take over operations of its home shopping network and associated internet e-commerce site, CNR Mall. In 2014 the joint venture reached 89 million households.

In 2013, QVC partnered with Ion Media Networks to bring its programming to broadcast television, through Ion Television. QVC began to be carried as the fifth digital subchannel on most Ion Television owned-and-operated stations beginning on August 5, 2013; due to technical limitations caused by the number of subchannels Ion requires its stations to carry, QVC is carried in a squeezed full-screen 4:3 format and is transmitted in standard definition, and the arrangement has since spread to other broadcasters with improvements in multiplexing a number of subchannels. The arrangement also features different on-screen toll-free lines for each station group to allow them to participate in revenue sharing in exchange for the channel space. The broadcast service is branded as "QVC Over the Air", with an accompanying on-screen bug appearing on the lower right corner of the screen during the network's programming.

After integrating their shopping experience with Facebook in 2008 and with Instagram in 2012, QVC launched toGather, a social shopping platform resembling Pinterest in July 2013. The site allowed members to set up a personalized newsfeed to view shopping recommendations from people and brands they chose to follow. QVC shut down the site in January 2015.

On October 21, 2014, QVC returned to the NASDAQ, with trading names QVCA and QVCB.

==== Mergers with Zulily and HSN into Qurate ====
In August 2015, QVC acquired the online retailer Zulily for $2.4 billion.

On July 6, 2017, QVC's parent company, Liberty Interactive, announced its intention to purchase the remaining 62% of stock it did not already own of HSN, the rival home shopping channel. The all-stock deal is valued at $2.1 billion ($40.36 a share). In 2018, Liberty Interactive rebranded itself as Qurate Retail Group, trading under the new NASDAQ tickers QRTEA and QRTEB, with Mike George remaining as president and CEO.

In 2018, Qurate named Leslie Ferraro as President of their QVC and HSN units. Ferraro concluded her 17-year run at The Walt Disney Company where she most recently served as co-chair of Disney Consumer Products and Interactive Media and president of Disney Consumer Products and reported to work at Qurate on September 16. On February 6, 2019, QVC again rebranded itself, the new logo with a square shape intended to resemble a computer or a phone screen emphasizing its digital and mobile platforms. The reimagined 'Q' in a sleek, mobile-friendly format, has a lever that is supposed to symbolize an open door, said Susan Ripke, QVC's vice president of brand strategy. On Monday, October 7, 2019, QVC ceased its 24/7 live broadcasting model in favor of airing nineteen hours of live and five hours of repeated programming daily.

==== COVID-19 pandemic response on-air and online ====
As early as March 16, 2020, QVC saw changes to their operations due to the global COVID-19 pandemic, with on-air product representatives appearing via Skype from around the world, calling in to live broadcasts with program hosts and models practicing social distancing. QVC remained live on-air 20 hours a day, with QVC2 temporarily cutting back to one live hour per day. Employees not essential to the West Chester, Pennsylvania live broadcast shifted to remote work, while all fulfillment centers in Pennsylvania, Virginia, California, and North and South Carolina remained operational with the introduction of health and safety measures and enhanced sanitation practices. Additionally, despite posted revenue gains, Qurate laid off 450 employees in July 2020 "to simplify and streamline its operating structure."

Approximately 75% of QVC's 1.2 million-square-foot Rocky Mount, North Carolina distribution center was damaged in a fire on December 18, 2021, which resulted in the death of an employee, along with the furloughing of the facility's 2,000-person workforce, as QVC chose not to restore operations at the site and sold it off in the spring of 2023.

On February 21, 2025, Qurate Retail Group, QVC’s parent company, officially changed its name to QVC Group.

=== Bankruptcy (2026) ===
On April 15, 2026, QVC Group warned that it was preparing to file for Chapter 11 bankruptcy as soon as the end of that day, citing steady viewer declines and debt burdens. QVC Group plans to enter a prepackaged restructuring support agreement with its creditors and exit Chapter 11 bankruptcy within no later than 90 days, or by around July 2026. On April 16, QVC Group filed for Chapter 11 bankruptcy protection in the United States District Court for the Southern District of Texas with plans to reduce over $5 billion in long-term debt, which will allow for the company to continue operating while having over $1 billion in debt remaining.

== Sister channels ==
=== QVC2 ===
QVC2
- Country: United States

Programming
- Language: English

Ownership
- Owner: QVC Group
- Sister channels: (see above)

History
- Launched: August 22, 2013; 13 years ago
- Former names: QVC Plus (2013–2017)

Links
- Website: qvc.com

On August 22, 2013, QVC launched a timeshift channel called QVC Plus (the first such channel operated by a home shopping network), made available initially on cable provider Bright House Networks and satellite provider DirecTV, which broadcasts the channel's programming on a three-hour tape delay. On April 1, 2017, QVC Plus was rebranded as QVC2 as a destination for more live programming, broadcasting live 12 hours a day, Monday through Friday from noon to midnight ET, and Saturdays and Sundays from 10am-10pm ET. After four months of reduced programming on QVC2 due to the global coronavirus pandemic, QVC2 ceased live programming on July 14, 2020, focusing thereafter only on repeated QVC programming. QVC2 restored live programming with 2 hours live programming daily on December 9, 2020, which increased to 13 hours live daily on July 1, 2021.

=== QVC3 ===
HSN3
- Country: United States
- Broadcast area: HSN Tower in New York City, New York
- Affiliates: See list of Affiliates

Programming
- Language: English

Ownership
- Owner: QVC Group
- Sister channels: QVC; QVC2; HSN; HSN2

History
- Launched: April 1, 2019; 7 years ago
- Replaced: QVC3
- Former names: QVC3 (2019-2026)

Links
- Website: hsn.com

On April 1, 2019, Beauty iQ's broadcast channel was rebranded as QVC3, airing rebroadcasts of previously recorded QVC and QVC2 programming 24 hours a day. On June 1, 2022, it took over the cable carriage formerly held by ShopHQ's secondary channel, ShopHQ Health.

=== In The Kitchen ===
In The Kitchen
- Country: United States

Programming
- Language: English

Ownership
- Owner: QVC Group

History
- Launched: April 23, 2019; 7 years ago
- Former names: Beauty iQ (2019–2021); QVC Now (2021–2022)

Links
- Webcast: Live Stream
- Website: In The Kitchen

On October 25, 2016, QVC announced the creation of Beauty iQ, a female-oriented television channel based entirely on beauty products. The network was launched on both DirecTV and Dish Network on October 31, 2016. Beauty iQ aired live programming Monday through Friday, 8pm- Midnight ET. Beauty iQ ceased live programming on March 13, 2019. Beginning April 23, 2019, QVC introduced Beauty iQ as their first digital-only channel, in order to better target its younger audience. On March 1, 2021, BeautyiQ converted to QVC NOW, a mix of various repeated QVC programming.

On April 1, 2022, QVC Now rebranded as "In The Kitchen”, being centered on QVC's culinary programming, foodie shows, and the selling of kitchenware products. The station is described as "a brand-new digital channel dedicated to all your foodie faves."

=== QVC 365 ===
QVC 365
- Country: United States

Programming
- Language: English

Ownership
- Owner: QVC Group

History
- Launched: 2026

In June 2026, it was announced that Roku would add seven new live channels (including the new QVC 365).

About a month later in July, QVC 365 was added to FreeCast, as well as being available on select over-the-air stations.

== Operations ==
All of QVC's operations (U.S., UK, Germany, Japan, Italy, and China) run 24 hours a day, although live programming hours vary between each region.

=== Headquarters ===
QVC has its headquarters in West Chester, Pennsylvania by U.S. Route 202. The $100 million QVC Studio Park complex, located on an 80 acres (32 ha) plot of land, opened in 1997.

=== American QVC operations ===
==== QVC Outlet and facilities ====
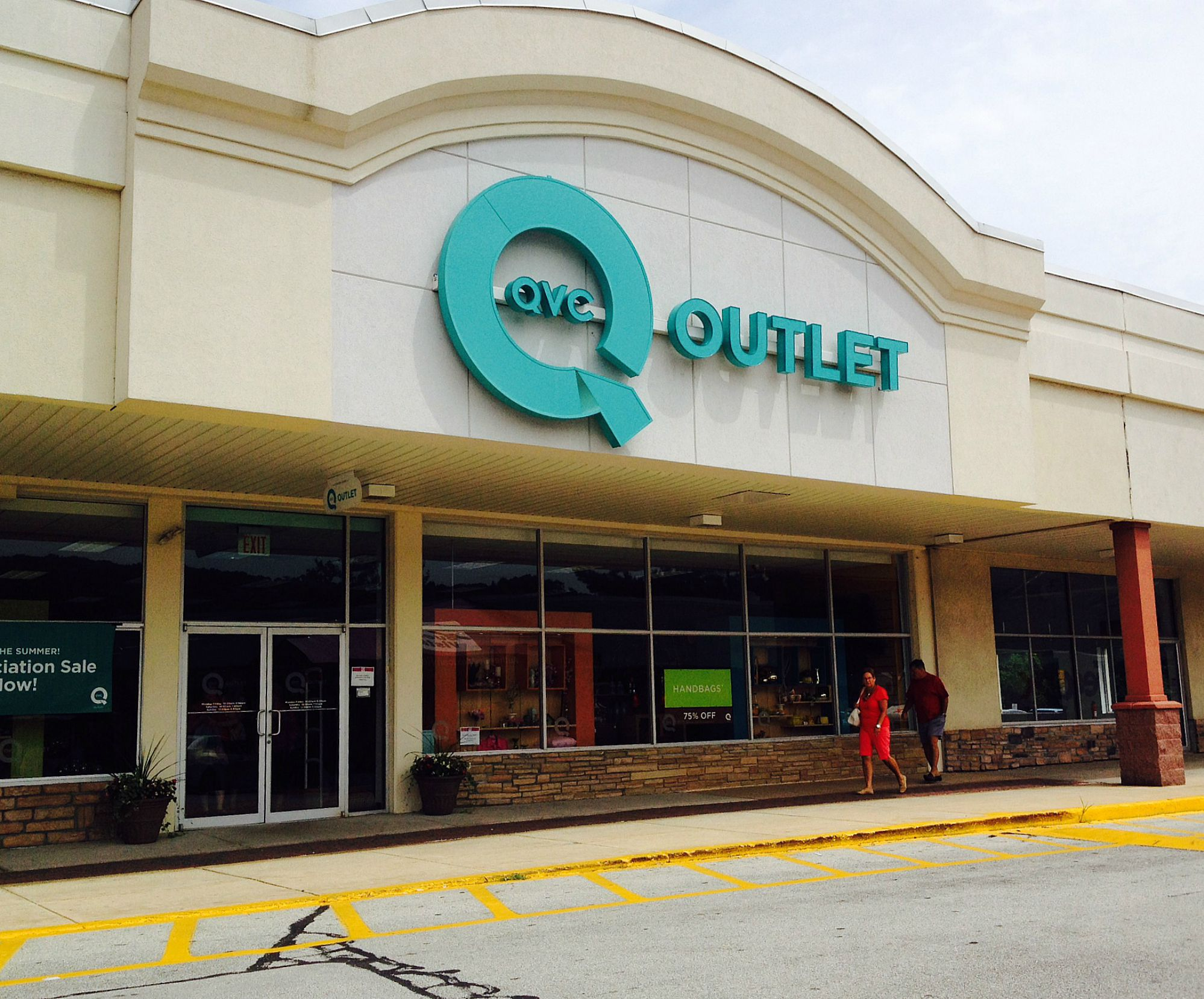
QVC Outlet store in Frazer, Pennsylvania, pictured in 2014.

QVC's U.S. operations are based in the Studio Park complex, which houses its corporate headquarters, studio and broadcasting facilities. Studio Park is the former corporate offices of the computer company Commodore. QVC's distribution centers are located in Lancaster, Pennsylvania, Bethlehem, Pennsylvania, Suffolk, Virginia, Florence, South Carolina, and Ontario, California. Its 2013 sales were worth $5.84 billion.

Call center facilities were located in San Antonio, Texas and Chesapeake, Virginia, though both closed after call center employees permanently transitioned to remote work during the COVID-19 pandemic in 2020. A call center in Port St. Lucie, Florida was also in operation until 2016.

QVC U.S. also operates a “QVC Outlet” store in Frazer, Pennsylvania, and formerly operated outlet stores (which are now closed as of June 2026) in Lancaster, Pennsylvania, Rehoboth Beach, Delaware, Brandon, Florida, Myrtle Beach, South Carolina and Mebane, North Carolina.

QVC broadcasts live in the United States 20/7. The four hours from 3am until 7am Eastern time, loop the "Today's Special Value" feature for Pacific Time Zone viewers, and previously aired programming. QVC broadcasts 364 days a year to more than 100 million households, and ranks as the number two television network in terms of revenue (#1 in home shopping networks), with sales in 2015 giving a net revenue of $8.7 billion. The only day on which QVC does not broadcast its usual format is Christmas, when the station runs a taped telecast of the West Chester Christmas Parade and other pre-recorded programming. Every year the "QVC Presents 'FFANY Shoes on Sale'" event is broadcast in which donated designer shoes are sold at half the suggested retail price and 80% of the proceeds go to breast cancer research and education. It is organized with the Fashion Footwear Association of New York, which runs a coinciding Shoes on Sale initiative along with an awards gala.

=== QVC in the UK and Ireland ===
QVC UK was launched on October 1, 1993. QVC UK's headquarters and broadcasting facilities are in Chiswick Park, West London. Call centre and distribution warehouse are situated in Knowsley in Merseyside. QVC UK also runs an outlet store in Warrington; another was in Shrewsbury, but this closed in June 2020. QVC UK also operates three channels made up mostly of rerun segments from the live channel, QVC Beauty, QVC Extra and QVC Style. The company's UK sales in 2013 were worth $660 million, now reaching to 27 million households in Britain and Ireland.

QVC UK's main channel broadcasts live 364 days a year from 09:00 to 01:00. For the 8 'non-live' hours a day and on one day a year, Christmas Day, the main channel shows rerun segments from the live channel.

=== QVC Germany ===
QVC Germany, incorporated in Düsseldorf, runs call centre operations from sites in Bochum and Kassel, whilst distribution is handled from a dedicated warehouse in Hückelhoven. The company's 2013 sales were worth $970 million.

QVC Germany first broadcast December 1, 1996 and reaches 41 million households in Germany and Austria. QVC Germany broadcasts live 17 hours a day, 363.5 days a year (the channel goes off-air on Christmas Eve (with no programming after noon) and Christmas Day). QVC has two additional channels in Germany, QVC 2 and QVC Style.

=== QVC Japan ===
QVC Japan, a joint venture with Mitsui & Co., is based in Makuhari, where its broadcast studio, corporate headquarters, and call center facility are located. Distribution facilities are in Sakura City. The company's 2013 sales were worth $1.02 billion.

QVC Japan first broadcast on April 1, 2001, and reaches 27 million households. The channel once broadcast live programming 24 hours a day and now airs 19 live programming hours daily.

=== QVC Italy ===
QVC Italy first broadcast on October 1, 2010. QVC Italy's headquarters and broadcasting facilities are located at Brugherio, near Milan and the distribution center is located in Castel San Giovanni. The company's 2013 sales were worth $130 million.

QVC Italy broadcasts live 17 hours a day (although the channel runs 24 hours a day), 364 days a year to 25 million households. The primary distribution platforms for QVC Italy are digital terrestrial television and satellite.

=== QVC France ===
On August 1, 2015, QVC reached its seventh international market with France. Before the launch, the company said it expected to create about 200 jobs in its first two years in the country. QVC France broadcast from their studio and administration facility in Seine-Saint-Denis live on weekdays from 15:00 to 23:00 and weekends from 11:00 to 23:00, online, on mobile devices and on major satellite TV, cable TV and internet TV. The channel's corporate website said QVC stood for: Qualité, Valeur, Confiance, replacing convenience with (the French for) trust.

Qurate Retail Group ceased operations of QVC France on March 13, 2019, stating that "QVC France had underperformed against financial and operational expectations, in large part due to unique in-market structural challenges and market dynamics that evolved in the years following the launch of the operation."

=== QVC/CNR (China) ===
QVC/CNR (China) is based in Beijing and operates both a television broadcast and associated e-commerce website cnrmall.com. The China operation is a 51/49 joint venture between state-owned China National Radio and QVC, which was announced on March 20, 2012 and officially took effect on July 4, and is based on the pre-existing CNR channel reaching 35 million households, with plans to grow to 195 million households that have digital cable. Chinese law prohibits private control of television stations, so this is the maximum position QVC can hold in its Chinese operations. QVC/CNR broadcasts live 17 hours a day. The company's 2013 sales were worth $110 million.

== Logo Gallery ==
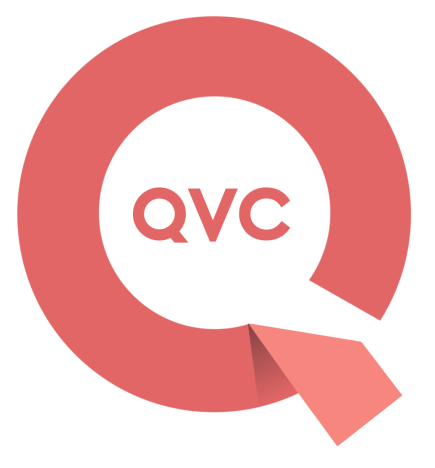
1994-2007	2007-2019	2019-present

== See also ==
- Diamonique
- Home Shopping Network – One of QVC's former primary competitors in the United States, which Qurate Retail Group acquired in 2017
- Jewelry Television
- Paramount v. QVC
- ShopHQ
