= Moran v. Household International, Inc. =

- Court: Supreme Court of Delaware
- Full case name: JOHN A. MORAN and The DYSON-KISSNER-MORAN CORPORATION, Plaintiffs Below-Appellants, and GRETL GOLTER, individually and in a derivative capacity, Plaintiff Intervenor Below-Appellant, v. HOUSEHOLD INTERNATIONAL, INC., a Delaware Corporation, DONALD C. CLARK, THOMAS D. FLYNN, MARY JOHNSTON EVANS, WILLIAM D. HENDRY, JOSEPH W. JAMES, MITCHELL P. KARTALIA, GORDON P. OSLER, ARTHUR E. RASMUSSEN, GEORGE W. RAUCH, JAMES M. TAIT, MILLER UPTON, BERNARD F. BRENNAN and GARY G. DILLON, Defendants Below-Appellees
- Decided: November 19, 1985
- Citation: 500 A.2d 1346 (Del. 1985)

Court membership
- Judges sitting: Christie, Chief Justice, and McNeilly and Moore, justices.

Moran v. Household International, Inc., 500 A.2d 1346 (Del. 1985) is a decision of the Delaware Supreme Court that upheld a shareholder rights plan (also known as a "poison pill") as a legitimate exercise of business judgment by Household International's board of directors. Moran is significant as the first case in which a U.S. state court upheld a shareholder rights plan.

== Background ==
=== Facts ===
Household International, Inc. was a diversified holding company with subsidiaries in the financial services, transportation, and merchandising industries. National Car Rental and Vons Grocery were among its wholly owned entities.

The board of Household International voted in August, 1984 to adopt a shareholder rights plan. This plan was adopted before the board was faced with any specific takeover threat—a significant difference from other takeover defense cases like Unocal. The board was concerned about the increasing frequency of "bust up" takeovers involving the break-up of large industrial conglomerates into smaller firms, and worried Household International might be the target of such a takeover.

John Moran was a member of the Household International board who opposed adoption of the Shareholder Rights Plan. Moran was concurrently the chairman of Household International's largest shareholder, Dyson-Kissner-Moran Corporation. D-K-M had been contemplating a leveraged buyout of Household International, but this plan never materialized.

=== Court of Chancery ===
The trial court found that the Household International board's adoption of the shareholder rights plan was a legitimate exercise of business judgment. The defensive tactics adopted by the board need not have been in anticipation of any specific threat and the adoption of a preemptive plan developed before the pressure of a crisis increased the likelihood that the board was acting out of business judgment.

== Judgment ==
The Delaware Supreme Court upheld the lower court's ruling.

== See also ==
- Unocal v. Mesa Petroleum
