= Buchwald v. Paramount =

Lawsuit about the film "Coming to America"

Buchwald v. Paramount Pictures, Corp.
- Court: California Courts of Appeal
- Full case name: Art Buchwald v. Paramount Pictures, Corp.
- Decided: January 31, 1990

Court membership
- Judge sitting: Harvey A. Schneider

Buchwald v. Paramount (1990), 1990 Cal. App. LEXIS 634, was a breach of contract lawsuit filed and decided in California in which humorist and writer Art Buchwald alleged that Paramount Pictures stole his script idea and turned it into the 1988 movie Coming to America. Buchwald won the lawsuit and was awarded damages, and then accepted a settlement from Paramount before any appeal took place.

The decision was important mainly for the court's determination in the damages phase of the trial that Paramount used "unconscionable" means of determining how much to pay authors, which is widely called "Hollywood accounting". Paramount claimed, and provided accounting evidence to support the claim, that despite the movie's $288 million in revenues, it had earned no net profit, according to the definition of "net profit" in Buchwald's contract, and hence Buchwald was owed nothing.

The court agreed with Buchwald's argument that this was "unconscionable" and therefore invalid. Fearing a loss if it appealed, and the subsequent implications of the unconscionability decision across all its other contracts, Paramount settled for $900,000.

The case was the subject of a 1992 book, Fatal Subtraction: The Inside Story of Buchwald v. Paramount by Pierce O'Donnell, the lawyer who represented Buchwald, and Los Angeles Times reporter Dennis McDougal.

== Timeline ==
In 1982, Buchwald wrote a screen treatment titled "It's a Crude, Crude World" (later renamed "King for a Day") that was pitched to Jeffrey Katzenberg of Paramount, with the intention of starring Eddie Murphy, who was under contract to Paramount at the time. According to the court documents, the synopsis for "King for a Day" was:

A rich, educated, arrogant, extravagant, despotic African potentate comes to America for a state visit. After being taken on a grand tour of the United States, the potentate arrives at the White House. A gaffe in remarks made by the President infuriates the African leader. His sexual desires are rebuffed by a black woman State Department officer assigned to him. She is requested by the President to continue to serve as the potentate's United States escort. While in the United States, the potentate is deposed, deserted by his entourage and left destitute. He ends up in the Washington ghetto, is stripped of his clothes, and befriended by a black lady. The potentate experiences a number of incidents in the ghetto, and obtains employment as a waiter. In order to avoid extradition, he marries the black lady who befriended him, becomes the emperor of the ghetto and lives happily ever after.

Paramount optioned the treatment in early 1983 and commissioned several unsuccessful scripts from several screenwriters. John Landis was considered as the director from time to time. After two years of development hell, Paramount decided to abandon the project in March 1985.

In May 1986, Paramount's rival Warner Bros. optioned Buchwald's treatment.

In the summer of 1987, Paramount began to develop a movie that was credited as being based on a story by Eddie Murphy, and which was to be directed by John Landis. The story outline was similar to Buchwald's story idea, and to the failed Paramount scripts that had been based on it.

In January 1988, Warner Bros. canceled their version of Buchwald's project, citing the Paramount project.

When the movie Coming to America was released by Paramount in 1988, Eddie Murphy was given sole story credit. Buchwald was not paid, or even credited as the story writer. Buchwald sued Paramount for breach of contract, as his contract with Paramount stated that he would be paid a certain amount if his treatment were made into a film.

== Decision ==
The California Superior Court decided in 1990 that Buchwald had demonstrated by a preponderance of the evidence that his story treatment and Paramount's unsuccessful scripts based on the treatment were "similar" to that of the Coming to America movie. Together with the evidence that Murphy and Landis previously had access to Buchwald's treatment, the court determined that the movie's story was indeed "based upon" Buchwald's treatment. Since Paramount never paid Buchwald, as the option agreement specified would occur if a movie based on his treatment were ever released, Paramount did indeed breach the contract.

In the second phase of the trial in which the court determined the appropriate amount of damages to be paid to Buchwald, Paramount testified that despite the movie's $288 million in ticket sales, it had spent so much money on the movie's development and marketing that, according to the formula specified in Buchwald's contract, Paramount had made no "net profit".

Plaintiffs have challenged as unconscionable a number of provisions of Paramount's net profit formula. The challenged provisions include: 15 percent overhead on Murphy and Landis participation; 15 percent overhead on Eddie Murphy Productions operational allowance; 10 percent advertising overhead; 15 percent overhead; interest on negative cost balance without credit for distribution fees; interest on overhead; interest on profit participation payments; the interest rate not being in proportion to actual cost of funds; exclusion of 80 percent of video cassette receipts from gross receipts; distribution fee on video royalties; charging as distribution costs residuals on 20 percent video royalties; charges for services and facilities in excess of actual costs; no credit to production cost for reusable items retained or sold; charging taxes offset by income tax credit; charging interest in addition to distribution fees; 15 percent overhead in addition to distribution fees; and 10 percent advertising overhead in addition to distribution fees.

The court then found that the formula was "unconscionable" and that Buchwald therefore could pursue a separate tort lawsuit against the company.

In 1992, a judge awarded Buchwald and his producing partner $900,000. Paramount appealed the judgment, and the parties settled the case in 1995 for $825,000, with the trial-court judgment vacated.

== Implications ==
The net profit formula in authors' contracts does not correspond to the net profit formula of generally accepted accounting principles that the movie studios use when creating their financial statements that are reported to the U.S. Securities and Exchange Commission and to the investing public. What the court described as an "unconscionable" formula in Buchwald's contract effectively double-counts many costs borne by the movie studio.

Some commentators have claimed this lawsuit was a watershed that would affect Hollywood's payments to anyone who enjoyed "profit participation" by forcing a change to the net profit formulas. However, a ruling by the California Superior Court in Batfilm Productions v. Warner Bros. regarding the 1989 Batman movie stated that a similar formula was not unconscionable. To date, there has been no review of this type of claim by an appellate court, meaning that the superior courts cannot look to an appellate court's decision for guidance.

Still, the case has caused nearly all studios and production companies to be more careful about how they handle scripts since they do not want to inspire a similar case if they accidentally use a plot element from work that comes without prior agreement. Concerned that "similarities" between future script drafts and movies could cause lawsuits, nearly all studios and production companies now return unsolicited scripts to their authors unopened.

== Response from John Landis ==
In the retrospective interviews included on the 2007 DVD release of Coming to America, John Landis and screenwriters Barry Blaustein and David Sheffield make no mention of Art Buchwald's lawsuit, and maintain that the film's story originated with Eddie Murphy, with Blaustein and Sheffield writing the screenplay from Murphy's 25-page treatment. In an interview filmed around the time of the film's theatrical release, and included on the DVD, Murphy himself claims that he came up with the idea for the movie while on tour.

In Giulia D'Agnolo Vallan's 2008 book John Landis, Landis is quoted as saying that Art Buchwald's case against Paramount was "without merit," going on to state the following:

I preface this by saying that I don't know Art Buchwald, and I have nothing against him. I should point out that for all of the media attention to that case, no one ever mentions Barry Blaustein and David Sheffield, the men who actually wrote the script! Every movie I have been involved with that was a big hit had people suing the studio saying it was their idea. We live in a very litigious society. You can sue anybody for anything here.

Landis also provided the following response as to why Buchwald's lawsuit received more attention in the press than other similar lawsuits:

Well, because it was Art Buchwald! He is an old East Coast media darling. The other lawsuits came from less famous people. I remember on Animal House, there were four or five lawsuits. And Universal just settled them, as that was cheaper than fighting and even prevailing! Art Buchwald is not only East Coast, he's also a newspaperman. The press is going to take his side. The irony of that case is that the only people that his lawsuit benefited were Eddie Murphy and me because it forced Paramount to open their books.

== See also ==
- Leibovitz v. Paramount Pictures Corp.
- Paramount Communications, Inc. v. QVC Network, Inc.
- United States v. Paramount Pictures, Inc.
