= Criterion Properties plc v Stratford UK Properties LLC =

Criterion plc v Stratford LLC
- Court: House of Lords
- Full case name: Criterion Properties plc v Stratford UK Properties LLC
- Citation: [2004] UKHL 28

Case history
- Prior action: [2003] BCC 50

Keywords
- Takeover defence, authority

Criterion Properties plc v Stratford UK Properties LLC [2004] UKHL 28 is a leading UK company law concerning takeover defences that a board of directors may employ to prevent a bidder buying shareholders' shares without the board's consent. It held that it is an improper use of a directors' power to frustrate a takeover bid through issuing a poison pill.

For public companies, the case is superseded by Rule 21 of the City Code on Mergers and Takeovers, which prohibits any action that frustrates a takeover bid.

== Facts ==
The former managing director (Aubrey Glasner) of Stratford UK (a subsidiary of Oaktree Capital Management LLC, a Delaware institutional money manager) had entered the company into a poison pill contract. If the managing director or the chairman (Rolf Nordstrum) left office, or if there was a takeover, the company would owe a crippling payment to a Criterion Properties through a put option. Criterion and Oaktree were in a joint venture. When the board of Stratford learnt of the pill, it dismissed Glasner.

== Judgment ==
=== High Court ===
Hart J at first instance struck down the pill. Quoting from Megarry VC's judgment in Cayne v Global Natural Resources Plc, he argued that the refusal to consider such reasons must not be taken too far and that the board must have authority to interfere with these constitutional rights where the threat is big enough. A company cannot, he suggests, be incapable of acting where it is at risk of ‘impotence and beggary’.

=== Court of Appeal ===
Brooke LJ and Carnwath LJ held that the judge's conclusion that the directors' had improperly exercised their powers was correct and should not have gone on to consider the actual knowledge of the director.

=== House of Lords ===
The House of Lords held that the case should be remitted to trial, to determine whether the directors had the authority to issue a poison pill.

Lord Nicholls held that there was no question of ‘knowing receipt’. An agreement can be set aside if company assets have been misapplied ‘and irrespective of whether B still has the assets in question, A will have a personal claim against B for unjust enrichment, subject always to a defence of change of position. B’s personal accountability will not be dependent upon proof of fault or ‘unconscionable’ conduct on his part. B's accountability, in this regard, will be ‘strict’.

Lord Scott held that the agreement would obstruct any takeover, not just the ‘unwanted predator’. So the case turned on authority, actual, apparent or ostensible.

== See also ==
- Cheff v. Mathes, 199 A.2d 548 (Del. 1964)
