= Courts of Delaware =

Courts of Delaware include:

State courts of Delaware

- Delaware Supreme Court
  - Delaware Court of Chancery
  - Delaware Superior Court (3 courts, one for each county)
    - Delaware Family Court
    - Delaware Court of Common Pleas
    - Delaware Justice of the Peace Court
    - Delaware Alderman's Court

Federal courts located in Delaware

- United States District Court for the District of Delaware
