= United States v. Paramount Pictures, Inc. =

1948 U.S. Supreme Court ruling on monopolistic practices by the film industry

- Supreme Court of the United States

Argued February 9–11, 1948 Decided May 3, 1948
- Full case name: United States v. Paramount Pictures, Inc. et al.
- Citations: 334 U.S. 131 (more) 68 S. Ct. 915; 92 L. Ed. 1260; 1948 U.S. LEXIS 2850; 77 U.S.P.Q. (BNA) 243; 1948 Trade Cas. (CCH) ¶ 62,244

Case history
- Prior: Injunction granted, 66 F. Supp. 323 (S.D.N.Y. 1946)

Holding
- Practice of block booking and ownership of theater chains by film studios constituted anti-competitive and monopolistic trade practices.

Court membership
- Chief Justice Fred M. Vinson Associate Justices Hugo Black · Stanley F. Reed; Felix Frankfurter · William O. Douglas; Frank Murphy · Robert H. Jackson; Wiley B. Rutledge · Harold H. Burton

Case opinions
- Majority: Douglas, joined by Vinson, Black, Reed, Murphy, Rutledge, Burton
- Concur/dissent: Frankfurter
- Jackson took no part in the consideration or decision of the case.

Laws applied
- Sherman Antitrust Act; 15 U.S.C. § 1, 2

United States v. Paramount Pictures, Inc., 334 U.S. 131 (1948) (also known as the Hollywood Antitrust Case of 1948, the Paramount Case, or the Paramount Decision), is a landmark United States Supreme Court antitrust case that decided the fate of film studios owning their own theaters and holding exclusivity rights on which theatres would show their movies. It would also change the way Hollywood movies were produced, distributed, and exhibited. It also opened the door for more foreign and independent films to be shown in American theaters. The Supreme Court affirmed the United States District Court for the Southern District of New York's ruling that the existing distribution scheme was in violation of United States antitrust law, which prohibits certain exclusive dealing arrangements.

The decision created the Paramount Decree, a standard held by the United States Department of Justice that prevented film production companies from owning exhibition companies. The case is important both in American antitrust law and film history. In the former, it remains a landmark decision in vertical integration cases; in the latter, it is responsible for putting an end to the old Hollywood studio system. As part of a 2019 review of its ongoing decrees, the Department of Justice issued a two-year sunsetting notice for the Paramount Decree in August 2020, believing the antitrust restriction was no longer necessary as the old model could never be recreated in contemporary settings.

== Background ==
The legal issues originated in the silent era, when the Federal Trade Commission began investigating film companies for potential violations under the Sherman Antitrust Act of 1890.

The major film studios owned the theaters where their motion pictures were shown, either in partnerships or outright. Thus, specific theater chains showed only the films produced by the studio that owned them. The studios created the films, had the writers, directors, producers and actors on staff (under contract), owned the film processing and laboratories, created the prints and distributed them through the theaters that they owned: In other words, the studios were vertically integrated, creating a de facto oligopoly. By 1945, the studios owned either partially or outright 17% of the theaters in the country, accounting for 45% of the film-rental revenue.

Ultimately, this issue of the studios' then-alleged (and later upheld) illegal trade practices led to all the major movie studios being sued in 1938 by the U.S. Department of Justice. As the largest studio, Paramount Pictures was the primary defendant, but all of the other Big Five (Metro-Goldwyn-Mayer, Warner Bros. Pictures, 20th Century Fox, and RKO Pictures) and Little Three (Universal Pictures, Columbia Pictures, and United Artists) were named, and additional defendants included numerous subsidiaries and executives from each company. Separate cases were also filed against large independent chains, including the 148-theater Schine.

The federal government's case was initially settled in 1940 in the District Court for the Southern District of New York with a consent decree, which allowed the government to resume prosecution if studios were noncompliant by November 1943. Among other requirements, the District Court-imposed consent decree included the following conditions:

1. The Big Five studios could no longer block-book short film subjects along with feature films (known as one-shot, or full force, block booking);
2. The Big Five studios could continue to block-book features, but the block size would be limited to five films;
3. Blind buying (buying of films by theater districts without seeing films beforehand) would be outlawed and replaced with "trade showing", special screenings every two weeks at which representatives of all 31 theater districts in the United States could see films before theatres decided to book a film; and
4. The creation of an administration board to enforce these requirements.

The studios did not fully comply with the consent decree. In 1942, they instead, with Allied Theatre Owners, proposed an alternate "Unity Plan". Under the Plan, larger blocks of theatres were blocked with the caveat of allowing theaters to reject films. Consequently, the Society of Independent Motion Picture Producers (SIMPP) came into existence and thence filed a lawsuit against Paramount Detroit Theaters, representing the first major lawsuit of producers against exhibitors. The government declined to pursue the Unity proposal and instead, owing to noncompliance with the District Court's binding consent decree, resumed prosecution via the 1943 lawsuit. The 1943 case went to trial on October 8, 1945, one month and six days after the end of World War II. The District Court ruled in favor of the studios, and the government immediately appealed to the Supreme Court.

The case reached the United States Supreme Court in 1948; their verdict went against the movie studios, forcing all of them to divest themselves of their movie theater chains. This, coupled with the advent of television and the attendance drop in movie ticket sales, brought about a severe slump in the movie business.

The Paramount decision is a bedrock of corporate antitrust law and as such is cited in most cases where issues of vertical integration play a prominent role in restricting fair trade.

== Decision ==
The Supreme Court ruled 7–1 in the government's favor, affirming much of the consent decree (Justice Robert H. Jackson took no part in the proceedings). William O. Douglas delivered the Court's opinion, with Felix Frankfurter dissenting in part, arguing the Court should have left all of the decree intact except its arbitration provisions.

=== Douglas' majority opinion ===
Douglas's opinion reiterated the facts and history of the case and reviewed the Supreme Court's opinion, agreeing that its conclusion was "incontestable". He considered five different trade practices addressed by the consent decree:

- Clearances and runs, under which movies were scheduled so they would only be showing at particular theatres at any given time, to avoid competing with another theater's showing;
- Pooling agreements, the joint ownership of theaters by two nominally competitive studios;
- Formula deals, master agreements, and franchises: arrangements by which an exhibitor or distributor allocated profits among theaters that had shown a particular film, and awarded exclusive rights to independent theatres, sometimes without competitive bidding;
- Block booking, the studios' practice of requiring theaters to take an entire slate of its films, sometimes without even seeing them and sometimes before the films had even been produced ("blind bidding"); and
- Discrimination against smaller, independent theaters in favor of larger chains.

Douglas let stand the Court's sevenfold test for when a clearance agreement could be considered a restraint of trade, as he agreed they had a legitimate purpose. Pooling agreements and joint ownership, he agreed, were "bald efforts to substitute monopoly for competition ... Clearer restraints of trade are difficult to imagine." He allowed, however, that courts could consider how an interest in an exhibitor was acquired; thus, he remanded some other issues back to the District Court for further inquiry and resolution. He set aside the lower court's findings on franchises so that they might be reconsidered from the perspective of allowing competitive bidding. On the block booking question, he rejected the studios' argument that it was necessary to profit from their copyrights: "The copyright law, like the patent statutes, makes reward to the owner a secondary consideration". The prohibitions on discrimination he let stand entirely.

=== Frankfurter's concurrence/dissent ===
Frankfurter took exception to the extent to which his colleagues had agreed with the studios that the District Court had not adequately explored the underlying facts in affirming the consent decree. He pointed to then-contemporary Court decision, International Salt Co. v. United States that lower courts are the proper place for such findings of fact, to be deferred to by higher courts. Also, he reminded the (Supreme) Court that the District Court had spent fifteen months considering the case and reviewed almost 4,000 pages of documentary evidence: "I cannot bring myself to conclude that the product of such a painstaking process of adjudication as to a decree appropriate for such a complicated situation as this record discloses was an abuse of discretion." He would have modified the District Court decision only to permit the use of arbitration to resolve disputes.

== Aftermath ==
The court orders forcing the separation of motion picture production and exhibition companies are commonly referred to as the Paramount Decrees. Paramount Pictures Inc. was forced to split into two companies: the film company Paramount Pictures Corp. and the theater chain (United Paramount Theaters), which merged in 1953 with the American Broadcasting Company. The other Big Five separated their theaters into Loews Theatres (MGM), Stanley Warner (Warner Bros.), List Industries (RKO), and National Theatres (20th Century Fox).

Consequences of the decision include:

- An increase in the number of independent movie theaters throughout the 1950s, 60s and 70s.
- An increase in independent producers and studios to produce their film product, free of major studio interference.
- The beginning of the end of the old Hollywood studio system and its golden age, allowing creative freedom for both behind-the-camera personnel and actors.
- The weakening of the Hays Code, because of the rise of independent and "art house" theaters which showed foreign or independent films made outside of the Code's jurisdiction; the Hays Code was replaced by the age-based rating system in 1968.

=== Reviews and termination of the Paramount Decrees ===
In 1980, the United States Department of Justice under President Ronald Reagan began a review of all consent decrees that were more than 10 years old. In 1983, the Department of Justice announced that it was in the "final stages" of reviewing the Paramount Decrees. Eventually, in February 1985, the Department of Justice announced that, although it was not formally terminating the Paramount Decrees, it would no longer pursue enforcement of the decrees in cases where doing so was “in the public interest.” According to media historian Jennifer Holt, "Effectively, this statement dissolved the authority of the decrees, if not legally then practically."

Paramount itself became indirectly controlled by theater chain National Amusements in 1994 through intermediate parent company Viacom.

In April 2018, the United States Department of Justice Antitrust Division began a review of antitrust decrees that did not have expiration dates. In 2019, the DOJ sought to terminate the Paramount Decrees, which would include a two-year sunset period as to the practices of block booking and circuit dealing to allow theater chains to adjust. The Department stated it was "unlikely that the remaining defendants can reinstate their cartel" as reasoning for terminating the decrees. The DOJ formally filed its motion for a court order to terminate the decrees on November 22, 2019. The move was opposed by independent movie theater owners, including the Independent Cinema Alliance, and independent filmmakers.

The court granted the DOJ's motion to lift the decrees on August 7, 2020, starting a two-year sunset termination period of the decrees.

== See also ==
- Financial Interest and Syndication Rules
- Bigelow v. RKO Radio Pictures, Inc., 327 U.S. 251 (1946), where the Supreme Court held that major Hollywood distributors had engaged in an antitrust conspiracy preventing certain independent movie houses from showing first run films.
- Buchwald v. Paramount
- Leibovitz v. Paramount Pictures Corp.
- Paramount Communications, Inc. v. QVC Network, Inc.
- United States v. Loew's Inc.
