= Leibovitz v. Paramount Pictures Corp. =

United States copyright case law

- Court: United States Court of Appeals for the Second Circuit
- Full case name: Annie Leibovitz v. Paramount Pictures Corp.
- Argued: October 20, 1997
- Decided: February 19, 1998
- Citation: 137 F.3d 109

Case history
- Prior history: Complaint dismissed, S.D.N.Y. Dec. 20, 1996
- Subsequent history: 137 F.3d 580

Holding
- A parody of Annie Leibovitz' photograph was deemed to be fair use. Southern District of New York affirmed.

Court membership
- Judges sitting: Circuit Judges Jon O. Newman, Guido Calabresi, Richard Dickson Cudahy (sitting by designation from the Seventh Circuit Court of Appeals)

Case opinions
- Majority: Newman, joined by Calabresi, Cudahy

Laws applied
- Copyright Act of 1976

Leibovitz v. Paramount Pictures Corp., 137 F.3d 109 (2d Cir. 1998), is an influential Second Circuit fair use case.

== Case background ==
Annie Leibovitz is a professional portrait photographer who had published a photograph of celebrity Demi Moore while Moore was seven months pregnant. The photograph, published on the front cover of Vanity Fair in August, 1991 with the title More Demi Moore, had achieved significant fame and notoriety on publication, and Paramount Pictures chose to parody it in 1993 as part of a promotional campaign for their new film at the time, Naked Gun 33 1/3: The Final Insult. Paramount's commissioned photograph featured Leslie Nielsen's face superimposed over the body of a pregnant woman, shot and digitally manipulated in such a way as to closely resemble Leibovitz' photograph of Demi Moore. Paramount ran the ad nationally, and Leibovitz sued for copyright infringement.

== Proceedings and analysis ==
Photographs at issue
Vanity Fair cover using Leibovitz's photograph of Moore is on the left. On the right, Nielsen's head is superimposed over the body of a model hired by Paramount.

At trial, the Southern District of New York found the use to be fair.

On appeal, the United States Court of Appeals for the Second Circuit affirmed.

Examining the four fair-use factors, the court found that although Paramount's photographer drew heavily from Leibovitz' composition, in light of Paramount's parodic purpose and absence of market harm, the use of the photograph was a fair use. While Leibovitz had argued that she was entitled to licensing revenue from the photograph, the court found that parodies were likely to generate little or no licensing revenue.

The Court took particular note that, while the composition and posing of the models is the same, other elements are different. For instance, the lighting between the two photos is different: in the Paramount photo the lighting is more garish, including greater contrasts and brighter colors while in the Leibovitz photo the lighting is warmer and more subdued. In the Paramount photo the ring on the model's right-hand is, again, garish, and much larger than the ring Demi Moore is wearing on her right hand. These artistic choices on the part of Paramount's designers heighten the parodic effect. The expressions on the models' faces are also significant: Moore's face has a serious expression, hearkening back to the classical "Venus Pudica" pose, while Nielsen's face bears a smirk, disrupting serious appreciation. The ultimate contrast is that of a healthy pregnant woman, compared with an older man's face superimposed onto a woman's body.

== See also ==
- Buchwald v. Paramount
- Paramount Communications, Inc. v. QVC Network, Inc.
- United States v. Paramount Pictures, Inc.
