= Cheff v. Mathes =

- Court: Supreme Court of Delaware
- Full case name: P. T. Cheff, Katharine N. Cheff, Edgar P. Landwehr v. Anne J. Mathes and Harry Lewis v. Robert H. Trenkamp, George Spatta, Ralph C. Boalt, John D. Ames, Motor Products Corporation and Holland Furnace Company. Robert H. Trenkamp v. Anne J. Mathes and Harry Lewis and Holland Furnace Company
- Decided: March 17, 1964
- Citation: 199 A.2d 548 (Del. 1964)

Court membership
- Judges sitting: Charles L. Terry, Jr., Josiah O. Wolcott, James B. Carey

Case opinions
- Decision by: Carey

Keywords
- Directors' duties; business judgment rule

Cheff v. Mathes, 199 A.2d 548 (Del. 1964), was a case in which the Delaware Supreme Court first addressed the issue of director conflict of interest in a corporate change of control setting. This case is the predecessor to future seminal corporate law cases including: Unocal Corp. v. Mesa Petroleum Co., Revlon v. MacAndrews, and Paramount v. Time.

== Facts ==
Holland Furnace Company manufactured home furnaces. The company's marketing strategy involved door-to-door sales, which employed a large workforce. This model, if not unique to Holland Furnace, was nevertheless unusual. From the standpoint of Arnold Maremont, a businessman who had been purchasing Holland Furnace stock, it was unprofitable. These practices also implicated Holland Furnace in charges of unfair trade practices. (An investigation of these practices by the Federal Trade Commission had already been pending for a year at the time of the events underlying the decision in Cheff.) Sales representatives for Holland would go door to door posing as official inspectors. Claiming to be employed by the homeowner's utility or by the local government, these salesmen would disassemble the furnace, refusing to reassemble it for lack of spare parts. Holland's core business lay in replacement boilers.

The Cheff-Landwehr family group had effective control over the company, with 18.5% of Holland stock. Cheff, a family member, was Holland's Chief Executive Officer. From 1948 to 1956, Holland's sales declined by 25%. Management attributed the sharp drop to a boom in sales following World War II, which could not be sustained in later years. Maremont, an owner of an automotive parts manufacturing business, approached Cheff in 1957 to discuss the possibility of a merger between the two companies. Cheff was not interested in a business combination. Rebuffed, Maremont purchased 6% of Holland stock on the open market. Cheff ordered an investigation of Maremont, and learned that Maremont had engaged in corporate takeovers and the liquidation of several companies. (At the resulting trial, Cheff would testify that Maremont was not well regarded among local area businessmen.) Cheff and Maremont met a second time, by which time Maremont owned 11% of Holland Stock. Maremont told Cheff that Holland's door-to-door sales tactic was obsolete and should be abandoned in favor of a wholesaler marketing strategy.

Upon learning of Maremont's plans, Cheffs and Holland's board of directors agreed that Maremont posed a threat to Holland's continued existence. Holland's board would claim that Maremont's threat caused many of Holland's employees to quit in anticipation of the threatened takeover. With the stated aim of eliminating Maremont's threat to Holland's existence, the Holland board of directors authorized the repurchase of Maremont's holdings of Holland stock at a price above the prevailing market stock price. Essentially, the board authorized the payment of greenmail to Maremont.

Business Judgment Rule

The Delaware Supreme Court first had to determine whether Holland's directors were protected from judicial scrutiny of their actions under the business judgment rule. While the business judgment rule typically protects corporate officers from judicial scrutiny of their actions, the rule could be limited if judges found a conflict of interest. In the case of Holland Furnace, the board's purchase of shares with corporate funds prevented a hostile takeover (which could have been in the best interest of the company) while also maintaining their control of the company. Thus, the court had to decide whether the Board was so conflicted that they should not be afforded Business Judgment Rule protection.

Threat to Corporate Policy

"The question then presented is whether or not [the board] satisfied the burden of proof of showing reasonable grounds to believe a danger to corporate policy and effectiveness existed by the presence of the Maremont stock ownership. It is important to remember that the directors satisfy their burden by showing good faith and reasonable investigation; the directors will not be penalized for an honest mistake of judgment, if the judgment appeared reasonable at the time the decision was made."

== Judgment ==
The court held that the directors were protected by the business judgment rule, because they held a good faith belief that Maremont posed a threat to Holland's continued existence. Testimony established the board's understanding of Maremont's reputation for acquiring businesses and liquidating them, and that Maremont's apparent intentions negatively affected Holland's work force.

Therefore, after Delaware's holding in this case, a director could rebut any inference of a conflict of interest, and remain protected by the business judgment rule, if they showed that they held a good faith belief that they were pursuing a "business purpose" that would benefit the corporation.

== Aftermath ==
The court's findings mention - and minimize - the FTC investigation of Holland Furnace. The court, endorsing Holland's board, also notes that Holland's downward sales-trend reversed itself in 1957, the year that Maremont was bought out. What the court does not mention is that Holland's fortunes suffered another reversal - this one fatal. Holland's sales were in excess of $31 million in 1958, but dropped to $1.1 million by 1965. That year, Holland stock reached a high of $1.63 per share, compared to a closing price of $11–1/8 per share in October 1957. Holland Furnace, listed in editions of Moody's Industrial Manual for the years covering the events of this case, did not appear in 1966.

Holland Furnace faced charges of unfair trade practices that were known prior to the decision in Cheff v. Mathes. As a result of their investigations into the sales practices of Holland Furnace, the FTC issued a "cease and desist order" against the company, an order upheld by the United States Court of Appeals, Seventh Circuit. Ultimately, Holland Furnace and Mr. Cheff were held in contempt for violating the order by continuing to engage in unfair trade practices. Mr. Cheff went to jail for 6 months.

The unsavory character of Arnold Maremont is a key factor in the court's decision. During proceedings leading up to the court's decision in Cheff, Mr. Cheff testified as to Maremont's reputation, that: "Throughout the whole of the Kalamazoo-Battle Creek area, and Detroit too, where I spent considerable time, he is well known and not highly regarded by any stretch."

Arnold Maremont, who died in 1978, involved himself in pursuits other than business. According to his obituary in The New York Times, Maremont was both a patron of the arts and a visionary for social justice. A governing life member of the Art Institute of Chicago and a former trustee of the Lyric Opera and Ballet Theater, Maremont was the first Illinois industrialist to back a law ending employment discrimination against African Americans. As chairman of the Illinois Public Aid Commission in the early 1960s, he campaigned for publicly supported birth control for welfare families.

== See also ==
- Weinberger v. UOP, Inc. 457 A.2d 701 (Del. 1983)
- Unocal v. Mesa
