= Andrew D. Christie =

American judge (1922–1993)

Andrew Dobbie Christie (1922 – May 28, 1993) was an American jurist. He was a justice and chief justice of the Delaware Supreme Court and a justice of the Delaware Superior Court for 35 years.

== Early life ==
Andy was born in Cincinnati, Ohio in 1922. His father was John W. Christie, a Presbyterian minister. Christie attended the local public schools, graduating from Mercersburg Academy in 1940.

He matriculated at Princeton University, but left to serve in the United States Army Air Force for three years during World War II. He then returned to Princeton, graduating with a degree in history in February 1947. While at Princeton, he was a member of the Key and Seal Club and the Westminster Society.

He received an LL.B. in 1949 from the University of Pennsylvania Law School, where he was a member of the Order of the Coif worked on the Law Review. He was admitted to the bar in 1949.

== Career ==
Christie served as a law clerk for the Hon. John Biggs Jr. on the United States Court of Appeals for the Third Circuit. He started his law career in private practice in Wilmington, Delaware in July 1950. In November 1952, Delaware Governor J. Caleb Boggs appointed Christie to be executive director of the State Legislative Reference Bureau. In this capacity, he assisted in revizing the Delaware Code, passed by the Delaware General Assembly in 1953.

Boggs then appointed Christie to the Delaware Superior Court for New Castle County, in May 1957. Christie held that position until March 1983, when Governor Pete du Pont appointed Christie to a seat on the Delaware Supreme Court vacated by the resignation of William T. Quillen. In 1985, Governor Michael N. Castle elevated Christie to the office of chief justice. Christie retired from the court in 1992.

== Personal life ==
Christie married his wife, Carol, in July 1946. They had four children: Andrew D. Christie Jr., George D. Christie, Anne Christie, and Elizabeth Christie.

He received the Bate Farnum Achievement Award from Princeton in 1987.

A year after retiring from the court, Christie was killed in a traffic accident in Arizona, near the New Mexico border, while visiting national monuments with his wife.
