= Retained interest =

Retained interest is not generally synonymous with a payout penalty is future, currently unpaid, interest that some lenders add to the remaining principal of a loan to determine a payout figure in the event that the loan is terminated before the completion of the original term.

When two parties enter into a loan agreement, For some fixed-term or precomputed-interest loans, the total interest is calculated in advance and allocated across repayments. Thus, each repayment can be considered to include two parts: one part repaying some of the principal of the loan, and the other paying interest.

In the situation that a loan is terminated early, a portion of the interest originally calculated for that loan has not yet been paid, as this interest would have been included in the interest portion of future repayments that are no longer going to be made.

Some lenders recover ("retain") some (or all) of this interest by adding it to the remaining principal of the loan when calculating a payout figure. This portion of the future interest included in the early payout figure for a loan is known as retained interest.

== Usage in Australia ==
Most Australian lenders offering commercial loan facilities (including chattel mortgage, hire purchase and finance lease) for cars, commercial vehicles and business equipment add retained interest to payout figures for loans that are terminated early. The amount of retained interest charged varies from lender to lender, but generally ranges from 20% to 100% of unpaid future interest.

Additionally, retained interest is generally not included as a fee on the loan documents, but instead listed within the Terms & Conditions of the loan contract.
