= Termination fee =

An early termination fee (ETF) is a charge levied when a party wants to break the term of an agreement or long-term contract. They are stipulated in the contract or agreement itself, and provide an incentive for the party subject to them to abide by the agreement.

== Service industries ==
Termination fees are common to service industries such as cellular telephone service, subscription television, and so on, where they are often known as early termination fees. For instance, a customer who purchases cellular phone service might sign a two-year contract, which might stipulate a $350 fee if the customer breaks the contract. Consumer interest groups have criticized such fees as being anti-competitive because they prevent users from migrating to superior services.

In the suburban Atlanta county of Gwinnett, customers were hit with termination fees of over $23 when the county commission chose not to renew the contracts of the county trash collectors in November 2008. The two companies charged this both in violation of county law and in breach of contract.

== Mergers and acquisitions ==
In mergers and acquisitions termination fees are often levied in the event that one party fails to consummate a merger—for instance, because it was unsuccessful in getting shareholder approval or because it agreed to a competing offer. For instance, in 2005 Johnson & Johnson agreed to acquire Guidant, but Guidant later accepted a competing offer and was subject to a termination fee of $705 million.

These termination fees have been criticized as well. Shareholders in companies being purchased sometimes believe that termination fees are too high, and instead of representing the costs that the purchasing party would suffer should the deal fall through, instead act as a way of forcing shareholders and directors to accede to the deal.

== See also ==
- Retained interest
