= Squeeze-out =

Compulsory sale of minority shareholders' shares

A squeeze-out or squeezeout, sometimes synonymous with freeze-out, is the compulsory sale of the shares of minority shareholders of a joint-stock company for which they receive a fair cash compensation.

This technique allows one or more shareholders who collectively hold a majority of shares in a corporation to gain ownership of remaining shares in that corporation. The majority shareholders incorporate a second corporation, which initiates a merger with the original corporation. The shareholders using this technique are then in a position to dictate the plan of merger. They force the minority stockholders in the original corporation to accept a cash payment for their shares, effectively "freezing them out" of the resulting company.

== Process ==
Although a leveraged buyout (LBO) is an effective tool for a group of investors to use to purchase a company, it is less well suited to the case of one company acquiring another. An alternative is the freeze-out merger; the Laws on tender offers allow the acquiring company to freeze existing shareholders out of the gains from merging by forcing non-tendering shareholders to sell their shares for the tender offer price.

To complete freeze-out merger, the acquiring company first creates a new corporation, which it owns and controls. The acquiring corporation then makes a tender offer at an amount slightly higher than the current target corporation' stock price. If the tender offer succeeds, the acquirer gains control of the target and merges its assets into the new subsidiary corporation. In effect, the non-tendering shareholders lose their shares because the target corporation no longer exists. In compensation, non tendering shareholders get their right to receive the tender offer price for their shares. The bidder, in essence, gets complete ownership of the target for the tender offer price. Because the value the non-tendering shareholders receive for their shares is equal to the tender price (which is more than the premerger stock price), the law recognizes it as fair value and non-tendering shareholders have no legal recourse. Under these circumstances, existing shareholders will tender their stock, reasoning that there is no benefit to holding out: if the tender offer succeeds, they get the tender price anyway; if they hold out, they risk jeopardizing the deal and forgoing the small gain. Hence the acquirer is able to capture almost all the value added from the merger and, as in the leveraged buyout, is able to effectively eliminate the free rider problem. This freeze-out tender offer has a significant advantage over an LBO because an acquiring corporation need not make an all-cash tender offer. Instead, it can use shares of its own stock to pay for the acquisition. In this case, the bidder offers to exchange each shareholder's stock in the target for stock in the acquiring company. As long as the exchange rate is set so that the value in the acquirer's stock exceeds the pre-merger market value of the target-company stock, the non-tendering shareholders will receive fair value for their shares and will have no legal recourse.

== Criticism ==
The legal community has criticized the present rules with regard to freeze-out mergers as being biased against the interests of the minority shareholders. For example, if a gain in stock value is anticipated by the majority, they can deprive the frozen-out minority of its share of those gains.

== Overview by country ==
Country	Squeeze-out threshold
Argentina	95%
Australia	90%
Austria	90%
Belgium	95%
Bermuda	90%
Brazil	95%
British Virgin Islands	90%
Canada	90%
China	No squeeze-out
Czech Republic	90%
France	90% (before 2019: 95%)
Germany	95%
Greece	95%
Guernsey	90%
Hong Kong	90%
India	No squeeze-out
Indonesia	No squeeze-out
Israel	95%
Italy	95%
Japan	66 2/3%
Jersey	90%
Kuwait	No squeeze-out
Malaysia	90%
Mexico	No squeeze-out
Netherlands	95%
Portugal	90%
Russia	95%
Saudi Arabia	No squeeze-out
Singapore	90%
South Africa	90%
South Korea	95%
Spain	90%
Sweden	90%
Switzerland	90%
Taiwan	67% (2/3)
Thailand	No squeeze-out
Turkey	98%
United Kingdom	90%
United States	90%
Ukraine	95%
Vietnam	No squeeze-out

=== Germany ===
In Germany, a pool of shareholders owning at least 95% of a company's shares has the right to "squeeze out" the remaining minority of shareholders by paying them an adequate compensation. This procedure is based on the Securities Acquisition and Takeover Act (ger. Wertpapiererwerbs- und Übernahmegesetz, WpÜG). An alternative procedure is governed by §§ 327a – 327f of the German Stock Corporation Act (ger. Aktiengesetz, AktG), valid since January 1, 2002.

For the first time in German history, this law provided a mandatory legal framework for takeovers, replacing the former voluntary takeover code (ger. Übernahmekodex). Although it has been asserted that the law does not break the German constitution it has courted the resentment of many small investors who consider it to be the legalization of expropriation.

Conditions required

The criteria for a squeeze-out are set out in § 327a AktG. The exclusion of minority shareholders of the company requires: a corporation or a partnership limited by shares (KGaA) as affected society (1), a major shareholder as defined § 327a AktG (2), a "request" from him, the company's shareholders may decide to transfer the shares of minority shareholders on him (3). This decision must be taken at a meeting in this regard (4) and provide a reasonable cash compensation for minority shareholders (5).

Decision

The decision to enforce a squeeze out must be made by holding a vote at the general meeting; as the major party already commands the vast majority of all votes, this usually is a mere formality. The compensation value is determined by the company's economic situation at the date of the general meeting, the minimum compensation being the share's average stock exchange price during the past three months.

Objection

Expelled shareholders can appeal against the squeeze out according to § 243 AktG. Also, according to this section, some reasons, such as inadequate compensation, are not sufficient to inhibit the squeeze out. Even while the rescission proceedings are still running the main shareholder has the right to register in the Commercial Registry if he meets the preconditions defined in §§ 327e sec. 2, § 319 Abs. 5, 6 AktG; by doing so an approval process is initiated and all shares held by minor shareholders devolve to him.

=== United Kingdom ===
Under UK law, section 979 of the Companies Act 2006 is the relevant "squeeze out" provision. It gives a takeover bidder who has already acquired 90% of a company's shares the right to compulsorily buy out the remaining shareholders. Conversely section 983 (the "sell out" provision) allows minority shareholders to insist their stakes are bought out. (see Companies Act 2006)

=== United States ===
In the US squeeze-outs are governed by State laws, e.g. 8 Delaware Code § 253 permits a parent corporation owning at least 90% of the stock of a subsidiary to merge with that subsidiary, and to pay off in cash the minority shareholders. The consent of the minority shareholders is not required. They are merely entitled to receive fair value for their shares. This is in contrast to freeze-outs, where the minority interest is unable to liquidate their investment.

== See also ==
- Takeovers
- UK company law
