= Henry R. Horsey =

American judge

Justice of the Delaware Supreme Court
- In office 1978–1994
- Nominated by: Pete du Pont

Personal details
- Born: Henry Ridgely Horsey; October 18, 1924 Lewes, Delaware, U.S.
- Died: March 3, 2016 (aged 91) St. Louis, Missouri, U.S.
- Cause of death: congestive heart failure
- Spouse: Linda George Horsey
- Children: Henry Horsey, Edmond Horsey, Therese Seibert, Revell Horsey, Ridgely Biddle, Robert Horsey, Elizabeth Horsey
- Education: Harvard College, Harvard Law School

Henry Ridgely Horsey (October 18, 1924 – March 3, 2016) was an American lawyer and jurist who served as a justice of the Delaware Supreme Court from 1978 to 1994. During his tenure as a justice, Horsey authored more than 200 published opinions.

== Early life and career ==
Horsey was born October 18, 1924, at Beebe Hospital in Lewes, Delaware, to Harold Wolfe Horsey and Philippa Elizabeth Ridgely Horsey. He grew up in Dover, Delaware, and spent his summers swimming in the ocean and sailing at Rehoboth Beach. Horsey graduated from Loomis Chaffee School, a high school in Connecticut. He was drafted at age 18 and served in the United States Army from 1943 to 1946 as an infantry and combat engineer before entering the European Theater and being discharged as a sergeant. Horsey attended Harvard College and Harvard Law School and graduated in 1952. He was admitted to the Delaware Bar in 1953 and practiced law in Wilmington, Delaware at Potter, Anderson & Corroon from 1935 to 1965. He also worked for Wilmington Trust Company as a trust officer and assistant vice president. After the death of his grandmother, Horsey moved to Dover in 1965 and continued to practice law as a deputy attorney general of the state of Delaware. He also operated his own law practice until 1969 before practicing at Morris, James, Hitchens & Williams.

=== Advocacy ===
Horsey became active in city politics to support environmental protection. He partnered with Governor Russell W. Peterson to pass the Delaware Coastal Zone Act, which became law on June 28, 1971. The law would protect and preserve Delaware's coastline from the impacts of heavy industrialization and offshore bulk product transfer.

In 1989, Horsey established the first protective sand dunes in Rehoboth Beach, after receiving pushback from city officials. The dunes continue to protect the beach communities and homes along the shore today.

== Delaware Supreme Court ==
In 1978, Horsey left Morris, James, Hitchens & Williams because he was appointed to the Delaware Supreme Court when it expanded from three justices to five. Governor Pierre S. du Pont IV announced his selection of Horsey to fill one of two seats created by the expansion. On November 27, 1978, Horsey and his fellow justices sat for the first time to hear argument.

Horsey's more than 200 opinions have been the subject of law school studies and law review articles and have also been cited by courts nationwide. His leading opinions cover all areas of law.

=== Notable opinions ===
His opinion in Riley v. State of Delaware (1985) explained the holding that a defendant's or lawyer's objection to a proposed juror solely on the basis of race is a violation of a criminal defendant's rights to a trial by an impartial jury, which became the format for the Supreme Court's seminal holding to prohibit such objections in criminal proceedings (Baston v. United States, 476 U.S.79 (1986)).

Horsey's opinion for the Delaware Supreme Court in Paramount Communications, Inc. v. Time Inc. (1989) explained the holding that target corporations have the right to defend their long-term goals when faced with a hostile merger or acquisition offer, as long as they are not in Revlon mode. The holding was a landmark decision in corporate law and governance.

His opinion in Garrison v. Medical Center of Delaware (1989) explained the holding that a health care provider's negligence in performing a medical testing procedure and failing to promptly report the results regarding a child born with birth defects is cause for a wrongful birth suit, but not a wrongful life suit. The decision also held that parents filing a wrongful life suit can recover damages, which exceed the normal cost of raising a child. The case is an example of competing interests under tort law.

== Personal life ==
Horsey was married three times: previously to Alexandra Leigh-Hunt and Ann Baker Horsey, then to Linda George Horsey. He was the father of seven children: Henry Horsey, Edmond Horsey, Therese Seibert, Revell Horsey, Ridgely Biddle, Robert Horsey, and Elizabeth Horsey. He had 11 grandchildren.

== Death ==
Horsey died of congestive heart failure in St. Louis, Missouri at the age of 91.
