= Delaware Superior Court =

US state court of law

- Established: December 2, 1831 (by Constitution); January 17, 1832 (took effect)
- Jurisdiction: Delaware
- Authorised by: Delaware Constitution art. IV
- Appeals to: Supreme Court of Delaware
- Type of tribunal: State trial court (general jurisdiction)
- Website: Official website

The Delaware Superior Court, previously known as the Superior Court and Orphans' Court, is the state trial court of general jurisdiction in the state of Delaware. It has original jurisdiction over most criminal and civil cases (except for suits at equity, which are handled by the Delaware Court of Chancery). It also serves as an intermediate appellate court, hearing appeals on the record from the Court of Common Pleas, most state administrative agencies, and adult criminal cases from Family Court. It is headed by Judge Jan R. Jurden.

The Superior Court includes a Complex Commercial Litigation Division (CCLD), which has been operating as a business court since 2010. The CCLD focuses on commercial disputes for money damages between businesses, complementing the Court of Chancery which focuses on internal business disputes.

== See also ==
- Courts of Delaware
