= Shareholder rights plan =

Defense against a takeover of a company

A shareholder rights plan, colloquially known as a "poison pill", is a type of defensive tactic used by a corporation's board of directors against a takeover.

In the field of mergers and acquisitions, shareholder rights plans were devised in the early 1980s to prevent takeover bids by limiting a shareholder's right to negotiate a price for the sale of shares directly.

Typically, such a plan gives shareholders the right to buy more shares at a discount if one shareholder buys a certain percentage or more of the company's shares. The plan could be triggered, for instance, if any one shareholder buys 20% of the company's shares, at which point every other shareholder will have the right to buy a new issue of shares at a discount. If all other shareholders can buy more shares at a discount, such purchases would dilute the bidder's interest, and the bid cost would rise substantially. Knowing that such a plan could be activated, the bidder could be discouraged from taking over the corporation without the board's approval, and would first negotiate with the board to revoke the plan.

The plan can be issued by the board of directors as an "option" or a "warrant" attached to existing shares, and it can only be revoked at the board's discretion.

== History ==
The poison pill was invented by mergers and acquisitions lawyer Martin Lipton of Wachtell, Lipton, Rosen & Katz in 1982, as a response to tender-based hostile takeovers. Poison pills became popular during the early 1980s in response to the wave of takeovers by corporate raiders such as T. Boone Pickens and Carl Icahn. The term "poison pill" derives its original meaning from a poison pill physically carried by various spies throughout history, a pill which was taken by the spies if they were discovered to eliminate the possibility of being interrogated by an enemy.

It was reported in 2001 that since 1997, for every company with a poison pill which successfully resisted a hostile takeover, there were 20 companies with poison pills that accepted takeover offers. The trend since the early 2000s has been for shareholders to vote against poison pill authorization since poison pills are designed to resist takeovers, whereas from the point of view of a shareholder, takeovers can be financially rewarding.

Some have argued that poison pills are detrimental to shareholder interests because they perpetuate existing management. For instance, Microsoft originally made an unsolicited bid for Yahoo!, but subsequently dropped the bid after Yahoo! CEO Jerry Yang threatened to make the takeover as difficult as possible unless Microsoft raised the price to US$37 per share. One Microsoft executive commented, "They are going to burn the furniture if we go hostile. They are going to destroy the place." Yahoo has had a shareholders rights plan in place since 2001. Analysts suggested that Microsoft's raised offer of $33 per share was already too expensive, and that Yang was not bargaining in good faith, which later led to several shareholder lawsuits and an aborted proxy fight from Carl Icahn. Yahoo's stock price plunged after Microsoft withdrew the bid, and Jerry Yang faced a backlash from stockholders that eventually led to his resignation.

Poison pills saw a resurgence of popularity in 2020 as a result of the coronavirus pandemic. As stock prices plummeted due to the pandemic, various companies turned to shareholder rights plans to defend against opportunistic takeover offers. In March 2020, 10 U.S. companies adopted new poison pills, setting a new record.

In addition to renewed interest during periods of market volatility, shareholder rights plans have also been adopted in response to rising levels of shareholder activism throughout the 2020s. Several empirical studies note that boards increasingly view poison pills as a temporary defensive measure intended to provide additional time to evaluate unsolicited offers or to negotiate with activist investors. This usage reflects a broader shift from long-term structural defenses toward short-duration tactical plans designed to protect against rapid share accumulations by hedge funds or other activist shareholders.

The Twitter Board of Directors unanimously enacted a shareholder rights plan in April 2022 following an unsolicited purchase offer from Elon Musk. The purchase took place regardless in October 2022.

== Overview ==
In publicly held companies, there are various "poison pill" methods to deter takeover bids. Takeovers by soliciting proxies against the board or by acquiring a controlling block of shares and using the associated votes to get elected to the board. Once in control of the board, the bidder can manage the target. Currently, the most common type of takeover defence is a shareholder rights plan. Because the board of directors of the company can redeem or otherwise eliminate a standard poison pill, it does not typically preclude a proxy fight or other takeover attempts not accompanied by an acquisition of a significant block of the company's stock. It can, however, prevent shareholders from entering into certain agreements that can assist in a proxy fight, such as an agreement to pay another shareholder's expenses. In combination with a staggered board of directors, however, a shareholder rights plan can be a defense.

The goal of a shareholder rights plan is to force a bidder to negotiate with the target's board and not directly with the shareholders. The effects are twofold:

- It gives management time to find competing offers that maximize the selling price.
- Several studies indicate that companies with poison pills (shareholder rights plans) have received higher takeover premiums than companies without poison pills. This results in increased shareholder value. The theory is that an increase in the negotiating power of the target is reflected in higher acquisition premiums.

=== Common types of poison pills ===
==== Preferred stock plan ====
The target issues a large number of new shares, often preferred shares, to existing shareholders. These new shares usually have severe redemption provisions, such as allowing them to be converted into a large number of common shares if a takeover occurs. This immediately dilutes the percentage of the target owned by the acquirer and makes it more expensive to acquire 50% of the target's stock.

==== Flip-in ====
A "flip-in" permits shareholders, except for the acquirer, to purchase additional shares at a discount. This provides investors with instantaneous profits. Using this type of poison pill also dilutes shares held by the acquiring company, making the takeover attempt more expensive and more difficult.

==== Flip-over ====
A "flip-over" enables stockholders to purchase the acquirer's shares after the merger at a discounted rate. For example, a shareholder may gain the right to buy the stock of its acquirer, in subsequent mergers, at a two-for-one rate.

==== Back-end rights plan ====
Under this scenario, the target company re-phases all its employees' stock-option grants to ensure they immediately become vested if the company is taken over. Many employees can then exercise their options and then dump the stocks. With the release of the "golden handcuffs", many discontented employees may quit immediately after having cashed in their stock options. This poison pill is designed to create an exodus of talented employees, reducing the corporate value as a target. In many high-tech businesses, attrition of talented human resources may result in a diluted or empty shell being left behind for the new owner.

For instance, PeopleSoft guaranteed its customers in June 2003 that if it were acquired within two years, presumably by its rival Oracle, and product support were reduced within four years, its customers would receive a refund of between two and five times the fees they had paid for their PeopleSoft software licenses. While the acquisition ultimately prevailed, the hypothetical cost to Oracle was valued at as much as US$1.5 billion.

==== Voting plan ====
In a voting plan, a company will charter preferred stock with superior voting rights over that of common shareholders. If an unfriendly bidder acquired a substantial quantity of the target firm's voting common stock, it then still would not be able to exercise control over its purchase. For example, ASARCO established a voting plan in which 99% of the company's common stock would only harness 16.5% of the total voting power.

In addition to these pills, a "dead-hand" provision allows only the directors who introduce the poison pill to remove it (for a set period after they have been replaced), thus potentially delaying a new board's decision to sell a company.

=== Constraints and legal status ===
The legality of poison pills had been unclear when they were first put to use in the early 1980s. However, the Delaware Supreme Court upheld poison pills as a valid instrument of takeover defense in its 1985 decision in Moran v. Household International, Inc. However, many jurisdictions other than the U.S. have held the poison pill strategy as illegal, or place restraints on their use.

==== Canada ====
In Canada, most shareholder rights plans are "chewable," meaning they contain a permitted bid provision. Under such a provision, a bidder that meets the requirements of a permitted bid may acquire the company by take-over bid without triggering a flip-in event.

Canadian plans are also subject to review by provincial securities regulators, and a hostile acquirer may apply to have a plan cease-traded. Regulators have generally set plans aside so that shareholders can decide whether to tender to a bid, though they have at times permitted a plan to remain in place long enough for the target to conduct an auction and seek a white knight.

==== United Kingdom ====
In the United Kingdom, poison pills are not allowed under the Takeover Panel rules. The rights of public shareholders are protected by the Panel on a case-by-case, principles-based regulatory regime. Raids have helped bidders win targets such as BAA plc and AWG plc when other bidders were considering emerging at higher prices. If these companies had poison pills, they could have prevented the raids by threatening to dilute the positions of their hostile suitors if they exceeded the statutory levels (often 10% of the outstanding shares) in the rights plan. The London Stock Exchange itself is another example of a company that has seen significant stakebuilding by a hostile suitor, in this case the NASDAQ. The LSE's ultimate fate is currently up in the air, but NASDAQ's stake is sufficiently large that it is essentially impossible for a third party bidder to make a successful offer to acquire the LSE.

==== Europe ====
Takeover law is still evolving in continental Europe, as individual countries slowly fall in line with requirements mandated by the European Commission. Stakebuilding is commonplace in many continental takeover battles such as Scania AB. Formal poison pills are quite rare in continental Europe, but national governments hold golden shares in many "strategic" companies such as telecom monopolies and energy companies. Governments have also served as "poison pills" by threatening potential suitors with negative regulatory developments if they pursue the takeover. Examples of this include Spain's adoption of new rules for the ownership of energy companies after E.ON of Germany made a hostile bid for Endesa and France's threats to punish any potential acquiror of Groupe Danone.

=== Other takeover defenses ===
Poison pill is sometimes used more broadly to describe other types of takeover defenses that involve the target taking some action. Although the broad category of takeover defenses (more commonly known as "shark repellents") includes the traditional shareholder rights plan poison pill. Other anti-takeover protections include:

- Limitations on the ability to call special meetings or take action by written consent.
- Supermajority vote requirements to approve mergers.
- Supermajority vote requirements to remove directors.
- The target adds to its charter a provision which gives the current shareholders the right to sell their shares to the acquirer at an increased price (usually 100% above recent average share price), if the acquirer's share of the company reaches a critical limit (usually one third). This kind of poison pill cannot stop a determined acquirer, but ensures a high price for the company.
- The target takes on large debts in an effort to make the debt load too high to be attractive—the acquirer would eventually have to pay the debts.
- The company buys a number of smaller companies using a stock swap, diluting the value of the target's stock.
- Classified boards with staggered elections for the board of directors. For example, if a company had nine directors, then three directors would be up for re-election each year, with a three-year term. This would present a potential acquirer with the position of having a hostile board for at least a year after the first election. In some companies, certain percentages of the board (33%) may be enough to block key decisions (such as a full merger agreement or major asset sale), so an acquirer may not be able to close an acquisition for years after having purchased a majority of the target's stock. As of December 31, 2008, 47.05% of the companies in the S&P Super 1500 had a classified board. As of March 31, 2020, 27.1% of the companies in the S&P Super 1500 had a classified board.

=== Shareholder input ===
A minuscule number of companies are giving shareholders a say on poison pills. As of June 15, 2009, 21 companies that had adopted or extended a poison pill had publicly disclosed they plan to put the poison pill to a shareholder vote within a year. That was up from 2008's full year total of 18, and was the largest number ever reported since the early 1980s, when the pill was invented.

== See also ==
- Green mail
