= Andrew G. T. Moore II =

American judge (1935–2018)

Andrew Given Tobias Moore II (November 25, 1935 – December 10, 2018) was an American attorney who was a justice of the Delaware Supreme Court from 1982 to 1994. He died on December 10, 2018.

Moore received a Bachelor of Arts from Tulane University in 1958, and a Juris Doctor from Tulane University School of Law in 1960. He was appointed to the high court of Delaware by Governor Pierre S. du Pont IV. After completing his term on the court and working at an investment bank, he became an attorney with Gibbons, P.C.
