= Atlantic Reporter =

Case law reporter

National Reporter System regions

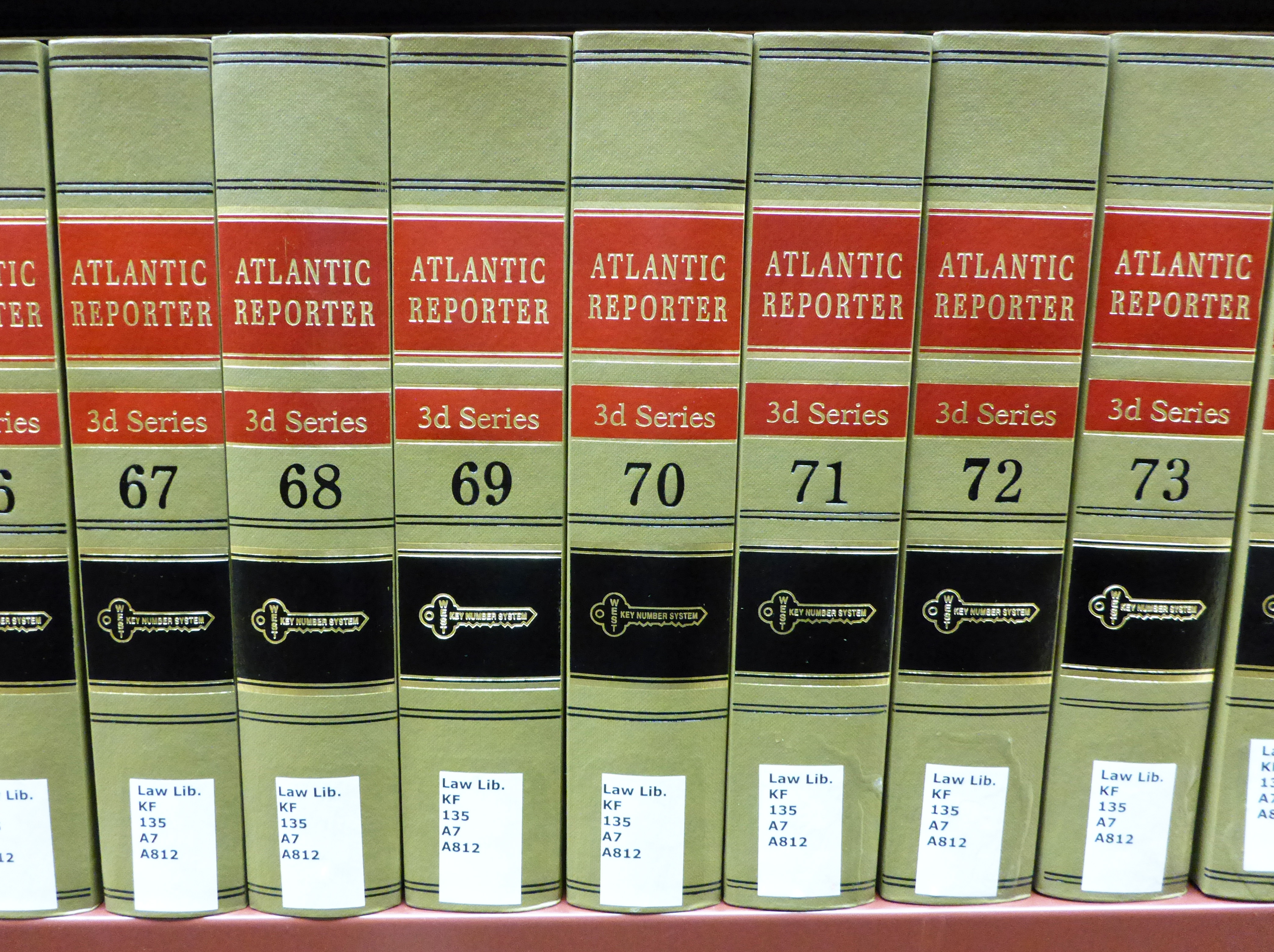
Volumes of the Atlantic Reporter at a law library.

The Atlantic Reporter (ISSN 8750-2631) is a United States regional case law reporter. It is part of the National Reporter System created by John B. West for West Publishing Company, which is now part of Thomson West.

The Atlantic Reporter contains select opinions of state supreme courts and lower appellate courts from the following jurisdictions:

- Connecticut
- Delaware
- District of Columbia
- Maine
- Maryland
- New Hampshire
- New Jersey
- Pennsylvania
- Rhode Island
- Vermont

The first series of the Atlantic Reporter was published from 1886 until 1938, for 200 volumes. The Atlantic Reporter, Second Series, was published from 1939 until 2010, for 999 volumes. The Atlantic Reporter, Third Series, is published from 2010 to the present. The citation forms for these series are A., A.2d, and A.3d respectively.
