= Delaware Supreme Court =

Highest court in the U.S. state of Delaware

Coordinates: 39.743288°N 75.546107°W

- Seal of the Supreme Court of Delaware
- Interactive map of Delaware Supreme Court
- Established: 1841
- Jurisdiction: Delaware, United States
- Location: Wilmington, Delaware
- Authorized by: Delaware Constitution
- Appeals to: Supreme Court of the United States (for matters involving federal law or the U.S. Constitution only)
- Judge term length: 12 years
- Number of positions: 5
- Website: Official website

Chief Justice
- Currently: Collins J. Seitz Jr.
- Since: November 8, 2019

The Delaware Supreme Court is the sole appellate court in the United States state of Delaware. Because Delaware is a popular haven for corporations, the Court has developed a worldwide reputation as a respected source of corporate law decisions, particularly in the area of mergers and acquisitions.

== Jurisdiction ==
The Supreme Court has appellate jurisdiction over direct appeals from the Superior Court, Family Court, and Court of Chancery. Because it is the only appellate court in the state, its jurisdiction over appeals from final orders is mandatory. However, it has discretionary jurisdiction over appeals from interlocutory orders.

The Court has original jurisdiction over writs of mandamus, prohibition, and certiorari. In addition, the Court regulates and has exclusive jurisdiction over matters concerning the admission and discipline of lawyers, the Lawyers' Fund for Client Protection, continuing legal education requirements, and the unauthorized practice of law.

Constitutionally, the Chief Justice is the chief administrative officer of the entire Delaware judicial system and has the responsibility for securing funding for the courts from the Delaware General Assembly.

== Procedure ==
=== Motions ===
Motions are normally handled in chambers by a motions justice. Arguments on motions are uncommon.

=== Oral argument ===
While the Court's appellate jurisdiction is mandatory, it is not required to hear oral argument. Typically between sixty and seventy-five percent of its decisions are rendered on briefs. If a case involves a novel question of law or the justices desire clarification, oral argument is called. Each attorney in oral argument is given 20 minutes to present its side, except for capital cases, in which each side is given 30 minutes.

Most cases are heard by a panel of three justices. In certain cases set forth in Rule 1 of the Court's Rules, the Court will sit en banc. These cases include those where the three justice panel cannot reach a unanimous decision, or where the Court has been asked to modify or overrule existing precedent.

In cases being heard by a three justice panel, the lawyers presenting argument do not know the identity of the justices hearing the argument until the justices enter the courtroom.

Arguments are normally held each Wednesday beginning at 10:00 a.m. in Dover, the state capital. Occasionally, the Court will hear arguments in special locations, such as the Widener University School of Law. The Court has a courtroom in Wilmington, but it is rarely used.

== History ==
The Court in its current form was established by means of a constitutional amendment in 1951. Before that, the Court had operated under the Delaware Constitution of 1897 as a unique "leftover-judge" system, wherein appeals were heard by a panel of three judges who were not involved in the matter on appeal from either the Superior Court or the Court of Chancery. In 1978, the Court's size was expanded from three to five. Prior to 1897, Delaware's highest court was the Court of Errors & Appeals, which operated under a similar "leftover-judge" system.

== Notable cases ==
- Cheff v. Mathes (1964): The first time the Delaware Supreme Court addressed problems of board of directors conflict of interest in a takeover setting. In this case, the court applied intermediate scrutiny to the board of directors' decision to pay a bidder greenmail, stating that directors must have "reasonable grounds to believe a danger to corporate policy and effectiveness existed by [the bidder's] stock ownership. [D]irectors satisfy their burden by showing good faith and reasonable investigation[.]"
- Smith v. Van Gorkom (1985): Expanded the modern doctrine of the business judgment rule to include the duty of care, often called negligence. Under the general business judgment rule, a Delaware court will not second-guess the decisions of a board of directors absent a breach of one of three fiduciary duties: good faith, due care, or loyalty. A plaintiff may overcome the business judgment rule – and receive a more favorable level of scrutiny under the "entire fairness" standard – if the plaintiff can show that the directors' decision lacked any rational basis (sometimes called waste).
- Unocal v. Mesa Petroleum (1985): A board of directors may only try to prevent a take-over where it can be shown that there was a threat to corporate policy and the defensive measure adopted was proportional and reasonable given the nature of the threat.
- Revlon v. McAndrews & Forbes Holdings, Inc. (1986): If a company is up for sale, the board of directors has a duty to maximize the value of that sale for the shareholders' benefit.
- Mills Acquisition Co. v. Macmillan, Inc. (1989): A board of directors may refuse a takeover attempt without submitting the matter to a vote of shareholders.
- Paramount v. QVC (1993): If a board of directors is about to consider selling, dissolving, or transferring control of a corporation, they are prohibited from considering non-shareholder interests and have a duty to maximize shareholder value.
- John Doe No. 1 v. Cahill (2005): An anonymous blogger's IP address will not be revealed via a Doe subpoena directed to his or her Internet service provider in a defamation suit, unless the plaintiff has alleged facts sufficient to overcome summary judgment. This decision has the practical effect of prohibiting SLAPP suits or similar litigation designed to quell dissent or unpopular comment. Cahill was the first suit of its kind in the nation; amicus curiae briefs were filed on behalf of the anonymous blogger by the American Civil Liberties Union and the Electronic Frontier Foundation.
- Unitrin, Inc. v. American General Corp. (1995): Directors' power to block hostile takeovers

== Composition ==
As outlined by Article IV of the Constitution of Delaware, Justices of the Supreme Court are appointed by the Governor of Delaware, subject to confirmation by the Delaware Senate. The governor selects nominees from a shortlist created by a commission. Justices are confirmed for a term of twelve years, and are subject to the same process of re-nomination and re-confirmation upon a term's expiration. Additionally, like all the Courts of Delaware, the Supreme Court is subject to a "bare majority" partisanship rule, where no party can control more than three seats on the Supreme Court.

=== Current justices ===
Composition as of 29 July 2026:

Name	Born	Start	Term ends	Party	Appointer	Law school
Collins J. Seitz Jr., Chief Justice	September 14, 1957 (age 69)	April 14, 2015 (Note: Took office as Chief Justice on November 8, 2019.)	2031	Democratic	John Carney (D) (Note: Originally appointed by Governor Jack Markell (D) as Associate Justice. Subsequently elevated by Governor John Carney (D) as Chief Justice, effective November 8, 2019.)	Villanova
Gary Traynor	August 25, 1956 (age 70)	July 5, 2017	2029	Republican	John Carney (D)	Delaware
Abigail LeGrow	1979 (age 46–47)	May 11, 2023	2035	Democratic	John Carney (D)	Penn State (Dickinson)
N. Christopher Griffiths		May 22, 2023	2035	Democratic	John Carney (D)	Villanova
Morgan Zurn		July 29, 2026	2038	Republican	Matt Meyer (D)	Pennsylvania

== See also ==
- Courts of Delaware
- Delaware Corporate and Commercial Litigation Blog
- State supreme court
