= J. Travis Laster =

American corporate lawyer and judge

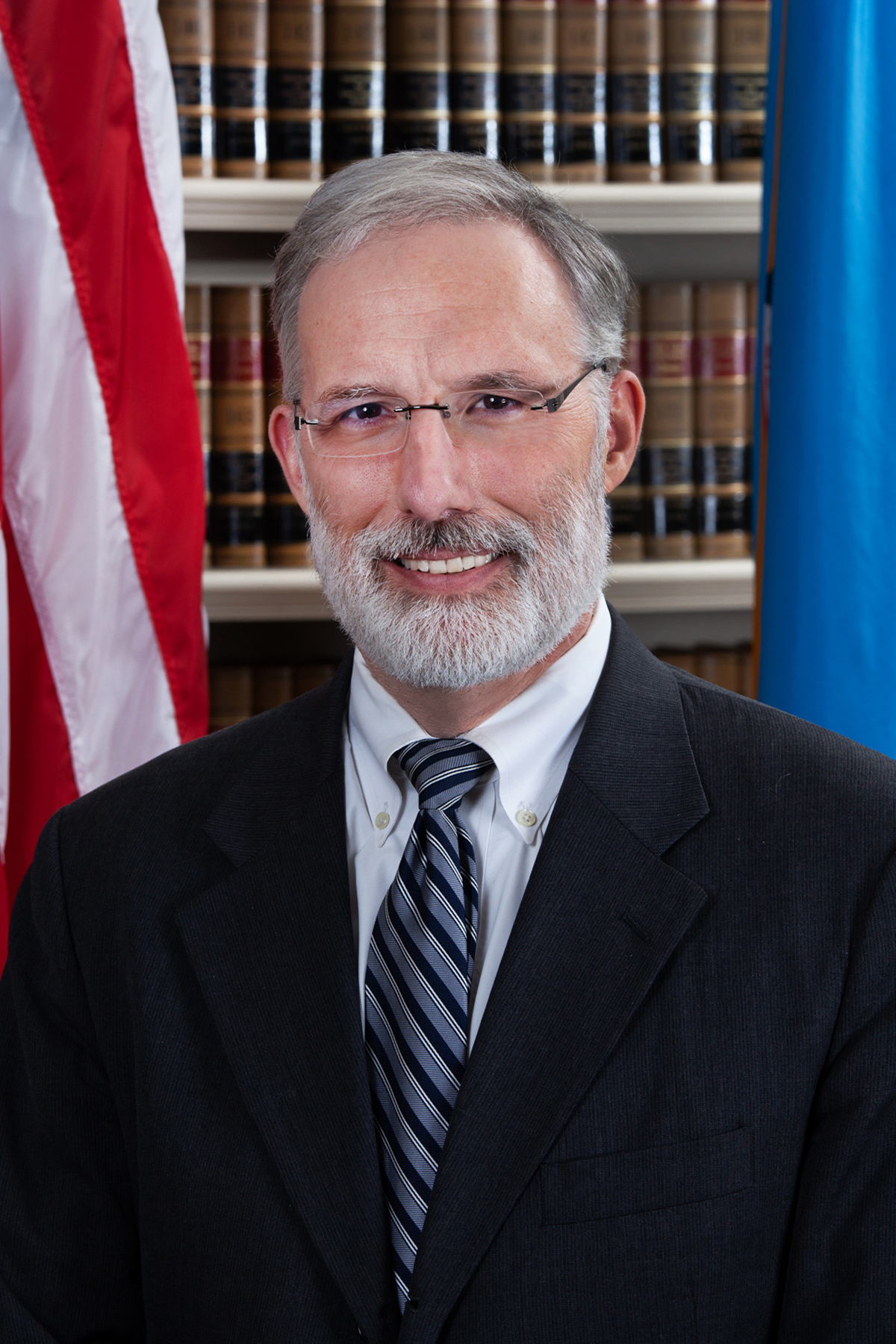
- Official headshot, 2019

Vice Chancellor of the Delaware Court of Chancery
- Incumbent
- Assumed office October 9, 2009
- Appointed by: Jack Markell (first term); John Carney (second term)
- Preceded by: Stephen P. Lamb

Personal details
- Education: Princeton University; University of Virginia School of Law

James Travis Laster is an American corporate lawyer and judge who has served as a Vice Chancellor of the Delaware Court of Chancery since 2009.

== Legal career ==
Laster graduated from Princeton University in 1991 and the University of Virginia School of Law in 1995. He clerked for Judge Jane Richards Roth on the United States Court of Appeals for the Third Circuit, before working in private practice at the Delaware law firm Richards, Layton & Finger. He founded a boutique law firm, Abrams & Laster, in 2005.

== Judicial career ==
In 2009, Governor Jack Markell nominated Laster to the Delaware Court of Chancery. He was confirmed by the Delaware Senate on September 22 and sworn in on October 9 for a 12-year term as Vice Chancellor. He took over the seat formerly held by Stephen P. Lamb.

He was nominated for a second term by Governor John Carney, and the Delaware Senate confirmed his reappointment on October 13, 2021.

=== Notable cases ===
In Akorn Inc. v. Fresenius Kabi AG, a 2018 mergers and acquisitions case, Laster's ruling was the first time that the court ever allowed a buyer to terminate a merger agreement based on a "material adverse effect" contract provision. Laster found that Akorn's business "fell off a cliff" after signing the agreement, and in a "durationally significant" way. He distinguished the case from other cases involving buyers who had "second thoughts after cyclical trends or industrywide effects negatively impacted their own businesses". He concluded that Fresenius was not required to close the deal and had validly terminated it. The Delaware Supreme Court affirmed.

In In re Delaware Public Schools Litigation, a 2020 lawsuit about property taxes and school funding, Laster ruled that all three Delaware counties' use of decades-old property values violated state law and the state constitution. The property tax system violated the state law requirement that property be assessed at "its true value in money", meaning fair market value, and the state constitution's requirement of uniform taxation. The litigation resulted in settlements, agreeing to property reassessments as well as school funding for certain disadvantaged students.

In United Food & Commercial Workers Union v. Zuckerberg, a 2020 lawsuit challenging the approval by the board of directors of Facebook, Inc. of a stock reclassification plan, Vice Chancellor Laster proposed a "refined test" for assessing whether a stockholder derivative plaintiff has satisfied the heightened pleading standards of Court of Chancery Rule 23.1. In a derivative suit, a stockholder plaintiff who meets the requirements of Rule 23.1 causes the corporation to bring a lawsuit against someone who has harmed the corporation, usually a corporate insider. Derivative suits thus "play an important role in policing corporate insider conduct and compliance by directors and controlling stockholders with their fiduciary duties." Rule 23.1 requires that a would-be derivative plaintiff either first demand that the board of directors cause the corporation to bring the lawsuit or plead "with particularity" that the directors could not have impartially considered a litigation demand—for example, if a majority of the board would be liable for the alleged misconduct that is the subject of the derivative lawsuit. In Zuckerberg, Vice Chancellor Laster proposed a new test for derivative actions that "blended" two overlapping standards "into a modern three-part test that accounts for recent developments in Delaware corporation law." In 2021, the Delaware Supreme Court unanimously approved the use of Laster's proposed test as the "universal test" for demand futility.

In AB Stable VIII LLC v. Maps Hotels & Resorts One LLC, a 2020 mergers and acquisitions case, Vice Chancellor Laster issued the first decision in a "busted deal lawsuit" filed after the COVID-19 pandemic disrupted the mergers and acquisitions landscape. The buyer, MAPS Hotels and Resorts One LLC, an affiliate of Mirae Asset Financial Group, contended that the seller, AB Stable VIII LLC, an affiliate of Anbang Insurance Group, violated a covenant to operate its hotel business in the ordinary course of business in the time between the signing of the merger agreement and the closing of the transaction. Laster held that by making "extensive changes to its business because of COVID-19, such as employee layoffs, furloughs and closing amenities," Anbang violated the ordinary course covenant, entitling Mirae to walk away from the $5.8 billion transaction. Laster also found that Anbang's lawyers, Greenberg Traurig and Gibson Dunn, "sadly . . . misled the court" about their investigation into fraudulent deeds to some of the hotels. "Put bluntly, (Anbang and Gibson Dunn) committed fraud about fraud," Laster wrote.

== Publications and Speaking Engagements ==
Vice Chancellor Laster has published numerous scholarly articles and regularly appears as a speaker on topics related to corporate law and the legal profession. He has published articles in The Journal of Corporation Law, the Georgia Law Review, the Texas Law Review See Also, the Delaware Law Review, the Delaware Journal of Corporate Law, the Virginia Law and Business Review, the Fordham Journal of Corporate Law, Judicature, The Business Lawyer, Delaware Lawyer, and the William Mitchell Law Review.

Laster also has commented on developments in corporate law and ethical issues in the legal profession in numerous public speeches, interviews, and panel discussions at fora such as the Rock Center for Corporate Governance at Stanford University, the UC Berkeley School of Law, and the University of Virginia School of Law. In a 2022 speech given to a group of law students and entitled "Big Law Ethics," Vice Chancellor Laster offered insights into ethical lapses by lawyers in several prominent cases he decided in recent years, including the Akorn and AB Stable cases. Laster emphasized that "[o]ur system depends on the integrity of lawyers," that "[f]raud destroys everything," and that "the problem of ethical lapses" at several of the most prestigious law firms in the country "might portend a more widespread problem." Laster discussed "Three Reasons Why Good People May Do Bad Things" and exhorted the students to take a proactive approach to legal ethics, adopt "justice" as their "top priority," and "[r]emember that the coverup is often worse than the behavior" the coverup is intended to hide.
