= Joshua Clayton =

American politician (1744–1798)

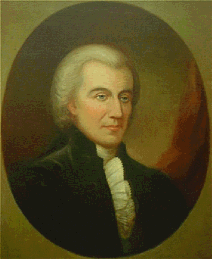

United States Senator from Delaware
- In office January 19, 1798 – August 11, 1798
- Preceded by: John Vining
- Succeeded by: William H. Wells

10th Governor of Delaware
- In office June 2, 1789 – January 19, 1796
- Preceded by: Jehu Davis
- Succeeded by: Gunning Bedford Sr.

Personal details
- Born: July 20, 1744 Wyoming, Delaware Colony, British America
- Died: August 11, 1798 (aged 54) New Castle County, Delaware, U.S.
- Party: Federalist
- Spouse: Rachel McCleary
- Children: 3, including Thomas
- Education: University of Pennsylvania (M.D.)
- Profession: Physician

Military service
- Branch/service: Militia
- Rank: Major
- Battles/wars: American Revolutionary War

Dr. Joshua Clayton (July 20, 1744 – August 11, 1798) was an American physician and politician from Mount Pleasant in Pencader Hundred, New Castle County, Delaware. He was an officer of the Continental Army in the American Revolution, and a member of the Federalist Party, who served in the Delaware General Assembly, as Governor of Delaware and as U.S. Senator from Delaware.

== Early life and education ==
Clayton was born near Wyoming, Delaware, son of John Clayton and Eleanor Edinfield. John Clayton was a miller and the grandson of another Joshua Clayton, a Quaker who came from Lincolnshire, England, in the late 17th century.

The younger Joshua Clayton attended medical school at what is now the University of Pennsylvania in Philadelphia, from 1757 until 1762, and then began a medical practice in Middletown, Delaware. He became close friends with Richard Bassett, and in 1765, married his adopted daughter, Rachael McCleary.

Clayton acquired a portion of Bassett's Bohemia Manor estate, and in 1773 built their home, called Locust Grove. It is now known as the Dickey Farm, and is on the Choptank Road, two miles west of Mount Pleasant in Pencader Hundred, to the northwest of Middletown. There they had three children who lived to adulthood, Richard, James Lawson and Thomas. Their religious affiliation is unclear, but they were almost certainly members of the Bethel Methodist Church by the time of their deaths.

== Career ==
=== American Revolutionary War ===
During the American Revolution, Clayton served in the Bohemia Manor militia, where he had been commissioned a major. He was also an aide and surgeon to General George Washington at the Battle of Brandywine and at Valley Forge.

=== Delaware General Assembly ===
Following this Clayton served in the House of Assembly in the 1778–79 session, and again from the 1780–81 session through the 1783–84 session. He was back again in the 1785–86 session, and the 1787–88 session. He was a candidate in the 1789 and 1790 elections for the U.S. House of Representatives. He was chosen President of Delaware by the Delaware General Assembly on May 30, 1789, and served as President until January 15, 1793. Under the provisions of the new Delaware Constitution of 1792 he became the first popularly elected Governor of Delaware and continued to serve in that capacity until his term ended, January 19, 1796.

This new state Constitution was the major political development of these years. With the new U.S. Constitution in place, it was necessary to revise the somewhat experimental Delaware Constitution of 1776. Under the initial leadership of John Dickinson, delegates provided for a real Governor, elected by popular vote and no longer sharing executive authority with the Privy Council. The other major change was to expand the voting franchise by eliminating the property ownership requirement.

==== A New State House ====
During Clayton's tenure it was determined that a new courthouse was needed in Kent County. Since the General Assembly had moved from New Castle in 1777 it had shared the county courthouse with the county officials. They wished to continue to do so in the new building. The county commissioners responsible for erecting the building agreed, but asked for "an appropriation for the completion of the building." In response, on June 2, 1788, a committee of the General Assembly reported that "in their opinion such is the situation of the treasury, together with loud complaints of public creditors and their duty to constituents, that the prayer of the memorial cannot be complied with at this time."

A few days later, though, "all moneys arising from marriage and tavern licenses were appropriated to completing the court-house," and "on July 29, 1791, a bill introduced by Kensey Johns was passed providing for a lottery to raise one thousand pounds for furnishing the court-house."

However, when the building was nearly complete and being occupied by the General Assembly:

on May 3, 1792, it is said that Sheriff John Clayton, by order of the Levy Court, entered the Assembly rooms with drawn sword, and demanded their use for the workmen. The General Assembly there-upon adjourned to the tavern of Thomas Hale, at Duck Creek Cross-Roads and continued their session.

The next day, the State House adopted the following resolution:

Whereas, John Clayton, who declared he spoke the sentiments of the people of Kent County hath, as one of the Commissioners for completing the Court-House in Dover, insulted the Legislature of this State by denying them the use of the chambers heretofore occupied by the General Assembly for holding their sessions, requiring them to be delivered up for the use of workmen employed about the building, in consequences of which both houses have adjourned the sessions to Duck Creek Cross-Roads; therefore, "Resolved unanimously, That in the opinion of this General Assembly the Legislature of the State ought not to be subject to the caprice of any individual in the State, and that it will not be proper for them to hold their sessions in the town of Dover until the Levy Court of Kent County, or some other proper authority shall, by an explicit act, appropriate to their use the Chambers in the said Court-House agreeable to the intention heretofore expressed. The State Senate failed to concur in the resolution, and pending further action the difficulty was reconciled, and beginning with the next session, November 1792, the General Assembly occupied the State-House, and have continued to the present time (1888).

=== United States Senate ===
Two years after his term ended, Clayton was chosen by the Delaware General Assembly to fill the vacant seat in the United States Senate caused by the resignation of U.S. Senator John Vining. He began his term January 19, 1798, and served until his death on August 11, 1798, while still in office. During this term, he served in the Federalist majority in the 5th Congress, during the administration of U.S. President John Adams.

Delaware General Assembly (sessions while President/Governor)
Year	Assembly	Senate majority	Speaker	House majority	Speaker
1788/89	13th	non-partisan	George Mitchell	non-partisan	Jehu Davis
1789/90	14th	non-partisan	George Mitchell	non-partisan	Jehu Davis
1790/91	15th	non-partisan	George Mitchell	non-partisan	Henry Latimer
1791/92	16th	non-partisan	George Mitchell	non-partisan	Allan McLane
1793	17th	Federalist	Daniel Rogers	Federalist	Stephen Lewis
1794	18th	Federalist	Daniel Rogers	Federalist	Stephen Lewis
1795	19th	Federalist	Daniel Rogers	Federalist	Peter Lowber

== Death and legacy ==
Clayton died at Mount Pleasant in New Castle County after being stricken with yellow fever while at the United States Congress in Philadelphia. He was first buried at the Locust Grove Cemetery in Pencader Hundred, New Castle County. Later his remains were moved into the Bethel Church Cemetery at Chesapeake City, Maryland. They were moved again to another location in the Bethel Church Cemetery in 1965 upon a widening of the nearby Chesapeake and Delaware Canal.

Clayton's son, Thomas Clayton, was a U.S. Senator, and his nephew, John M. Clayton was also a U.S. Senator as well as U.S. Secretary of State. His great-grandson Henry Clayton built Woodside; listed on the National Register of Historic Places in 1985.

== Almanac ==
Elections were held October 1 and members of the General Assembly took office on October 20 or the following weekday. State Assemblymen had a one-year term. The whole General Assembly chose the State President for a three-year term. The General Assembly also chose the U.S. Senators who took office March 4 for a six-year term. In this case he was completing the existing term, the vacancy caused by the resignation of John Vining.

Beginning in 1792 elections were held on the first Tuesday of October and members of the General Assembly took office on the first Tuesday of January. Also in 1792 the State Legislative Council was renamed the State Senate and the State House of Assembly became the State House of Representatives. The State President became the Governor and was popularly elected. He takes office the third Tuesday in January and had a three-year term.

Public offices
Office	Type	Location	Began office	Ended office	Notes
Assemblyman	Legislature	Dover	October 20, 1778	October 20, 1779	
Assemblyman	Legislature	Dover	October 20, 1780	October 20, 1781	
Assemblyman	Legislature	Dover	October 20, 1781	October 21, 1782	
Assemblyman	Legislature	Dover	October 21, 1782	October 20, 1783	
Assemblyman	Legislature	Dover	October 20, 1783	October 20, 1784	
Assemblyman	Legislature	Dover	October 20, 1785	October 20, 1786	
Assemblyman	Legislature	Dover	October 20, 1786	October 20, 1787	
Assemblyman	Legislature	Dover	October 20, 1787	October 20, 1788	
State President	Executive	Dover	May 30, 1789	January 15, 1793	
Governor	Executive	Dover	January 15, 1793	January 13, 1796	
U.S. Senator	Legislature	Philadelphia	January 19, 1798	August 11, 1798	

Delaware General Assembly service
Dates	Assembly	Chamber	Majority	Governor	Committees	District
1778/79	3rd	State House	non-partisan	Caesar Rodney		New Castle at-large
1780/81	5th	State House	non-partisan	Caesar Rodney		New Castle at-large
1781/82	6th	State House	non-partisan	John Dickinson		New Castle at-large
1782/83	7th	State House	non-partisan	John Cook		New Castle at-large
1783/84	8th	State House	non-partisan	Nicholas Van Dyke		New Castle at-large
1785/86	10th	State House	non-partisan	Nicholas Van Dyke		New Castle at-large
1786/87	11th	State House	non-partisan	Thomas Collins		New Castle at-large
1787/88	12th	State House	non-partisan	Thomas Collins		New Castle at-large

United States congressional service
Dates	Congress	Chamber	Majority	President	Committees	Class/District
1797–1799	5th	U.S. Senate	Federalist	John Adams		class 2 (Note: Elected to fill vacancy caused by resignation of John Vining.)

Election results
Year	Office	Subject	Party	Votes	%	Opponent	Party	Votes	%
1792	Governor	Joshua Clayton	Federalist	2,209	48%	Thomas Montgomery; George Mitchell	Republican; Independent Federalist	1,902; 458	42% 10%

== See also ==
- List of members of the United States Congress who died in office (1790–1899)

== Sources ==
- Conrad, Henry C. (1908). History of the State of Delaware. Lancaster, Pennsylvania: Wickersham Company.
- Martin, Roger A. (1984). History of Delaware Through its Governors. Wilmington, Delaware: McClafferty Press.
- Martin, Roger A. (1995). Memoirs of the Senate. Newark, Delaware: Roger A. Martin.
- Munroe, John A. (1954). Federalist Delaware 1775–1815. New Brunswick, New Jersey: Rutgers University. ISBN 978-0-598-92920-4.
- Rodney, Richard S. (1975). Collected Essays on Early Delaware. Wilmington, Delaware: Society of Colonial Wars in the State of Delaware.
- Scharf, John Thomas (1888). History of Delaware 1609–1888. 2 vols. Philadelphia: L. J. Richards & Co. ISBN 0-87413-493-5.
- Wilson, Emerson. (1969). Forgotten Heroes of Delaware. Cambridge, Massachusetts: Deltos Publishing Company.

== Images ==
- Hall of Governors Portrait Gallery Portrait courtesy of Historical and Cultural Affairs, Dover

== Places with more information ==
- Delaware Historical Society; website; 505 North Market Street, Wilmington, Delaware 19801; (302) 655-7161.
- University of Delaware; Library website; 181 South College Avenue, Newark, Delaware 19717; (302) 831–2965.

Party political offices
First	Federalist nominee for Governor of Delaware; 1792	Succeeded by Gunning Bedford Sr.
Political offices
Preceded by Office created	Governor of Delaware; 1793–1796	Succeeded by Gunning Bedford Sr.
U.S. Senate
Preceded by John Vining	U.S. Senator from Delaware; 1798	Succeeded by William H. Wells
