= Bank of New York Mellon v. Realogy Corp. =

- Court: Delaware Court of Chancery
- Decided: December 18, 2008
- Citation: 979 A.2d 1113 (Del. Ch. 2008)

Case history
- Prior action: None
- Subsequent action: None

Questions presented
- Did Realogy’s proposed debt refinancing violate the indenture’s “Permitted Liens” provisions?

Holding
- Realogy's proposed debt exchange offer was not permissible under the terms of the indenture governing its existing debt.

Court membership
- Judge sitting: Leo E. Strine Jr.

Bank of New York Mellon v. Realogy Corporation, 2008 WL 5259732, is a case that was decided in Delaware's Court of Chancery in 2008. The court held that a company's proposed debt exchange offer was not permissible under the terms of the documents governing the company's debt. The case is frequently referenced in banking law and is used in several law school case books.

== Facts ==
Realogy had several outstanding debts and sought to refinance many of its debt notes by offering to exchange the notes for term loans under a new $500 million term loan facility. The new term loans would be issued under the credit facility and would be secured by a second lien on almost all of Realogy's assets.

Because the new term loans were to be secured by second liens under the credit facility, the proposed exchange offer would have allowed the "Senior Fixed Notes" to effectively become senior to the "Senior Toggle Notes" and the "Senior Subordinated Notes" to "leapfrog" in priority over the Senior Toggle Notes.

The trustee under the indenture sued Realogy on behalf of holders of the Senior Toggle Notes, arguing that the exchange offer breached the indenture.

== Opinion ==
The court observed that an interpretation of the exclusion to the definition of "Permitted Refinancing Indebtedness" that required nothing more than compliance with the covenants would add no substance to the definition. The exclusion would then be "mere surplusage."

== Impact ==
Although the Delaware court did not allow Realogy to pursue its proposed refinancing structure and there is always a risk of litigation where one group of creditors may be adversely affected by a proposed transaction, the court’s reasoning may actually facilitate debt exchange offers by companies.
