= Leo E. Strine Jr. =

American judge (born 1964)

Leo Strine

Chief Justice of the Delaware Supreme Court
- In office February 28, 2014 – October 30, 2019
- Preceded by: Myron T. Steele
- Succeeded by: Karen L. Valihura (acting)

Chancellor of the Delaware Court of Chancery
- In office 2011–2014
- Preceded by: William B. Chandler III
- Succeeded by: Andre Bouchard

Vice Chancellor of the Delaware Court of Chancery
- In office 1998–2011
- Preceded by: Bernard Balick
- Succeeded by: Sam Glasscock III

Personal details
- Born: 1964 (age 61–62) Baltimore, Maryland, U.S.
- Party: Democratic
- Education: University of Delaware (BA); University of Pennsylvania (JD)

Leo E. Strine, Jr. (born 1964) is an American attorney and retired judge for the state of Delaware. He served on the Delaware Court of Chancery as vice chancellor from 1998 to 2011 and chancellor from 2011 to 2014, and as the chief justice of the Delaware Supreme Court from 2014 to 2019. Strine joined Wachtell, Lipton, Rosen & Katz in 2020.

== Life and career ==
Born in Baltimore, Strine grew up in Hockessin, Delaware. He graduated from A.I. DuPont High School in 1982. Strine then graduated magna cum laude from the University of Pennsylvania Law School in 1988 with his Juris Doctor, after having received his Bachelor of Arts summa cum laude from the University of Delaware in 1985.

Strine clerked for Judge Walter King Stapleton of the United States Court of Appeals for the Third Circuit and for Chief Judge John F. Gerry of the United States District Court for the District of New Jersey. He was a corporate litigator at the firm of Skadden, Arps, Slate, Meagher & Flom, and then Counsel to Governor Thomas R. Carper.

Strine has taught at several academic institutions including UCLA School of Law, University of Pennsylvania Law School, Vanderbilt University Law School, and Harvard Law School, and lectured at many more. He is currently the Michael L. Wachter Distinguished Fellow in Law and Policy at the University of Pennsylvania Law School. He became Vice Chancellor of the Delaware Court of Chancery on November 9, 1998, and became Chancellor of that court on June 22, 2011. During the 2006–2007 academic year, he served as a special judicial consultant to the American Bar Association's Committee on Corporate Laws. Strine was confirmed as Chief Justice of the Delaware Supreme Court on January 29, 2014.

In October 2018, Strine wrote for the majority when it found that the business judgment rule protected a controlling shareholder even though it did not offer minority shareholder protections until after its initial squeeze-out bid.

In July 2019, Strine announced his retirement from the bench, to be carried out at the end of September or October or upon the confirmation of his successor. Strine retired from active service on October 30, 2019.

In April 2020, the New York-based law firm Wachtell Lipton announced that former Chief Justice Strine would be joining its firm to advise Wachtell’s clients on mergers, litigation and other matters.

In July 2022, Twitter announced it had retained Wachtell Lipton to sue Elon Musk in regards to the termination of Twitter's acquisition by Musk. Strine was announced as part of the team handling the matter.

== Personal life ==
Strine lives in Hockessin, Delaware, with his wife Carrie, an occupational therapist, and their two sons, James and Benjamin.

== Controversy ==
In a 2010 case, Ingres Corp. v. CA Inc., during a breach of contract case, both sides, Ingres Corp and CA Inc, both agreed that Strine erred. Vice Chancellor Strine made a comment that he, "forgot this oral statement and delved only into the voluminous record. As indicated above, this record was confusing and I came away from it with the wrong impression. …I overlooked this deposition testimony and instead focused upon the written documents in the record when drafting the Post-Trial Opinion. In short, I blew it.” Although he acknowledged that his "original factual finding to the contrary was inaccurate," Strine held that his error did not change the outcome of the case.

== Publications ==
Strine has published many academic articles on corporate law and is a frequent commenter on business law, generally. Notably, he has been published by the Yale Law Journal, Harvard Law Review, University of Pennsylvania Law Review, Cornell Law Review, Northwestern University Law Review, Delaware Journal of Corporate Law, and the Journal of Corporation Law. Many of his scholarly writings can be found on his SSRN page.

== See also ==
- Delaware Court of Chancery
- Supreme Court of Delaware
- US corporate law

Legal offices
Preceded by Myron T. Steele	Chief Justice of the Delaware Supreme Court; 2014–2019	Succeeded by Karen L. Valihura; Acting
