= Pipher v. Parsell =

Supreme Court case

- Court: Supreme Court of Delaware
- Full case name: Kristyn Pipher, Plaintiff Below, Appellant, v. Johnathan Parsell, Defendant Below, Appellee.
- Decided: June 19, 2007
- Citation: 930 A.2d 890

Case history
- Appealed from: Delaware Superior Court

Court membership
- Judges sitting: Myron T. Steele, Randy J. Holland, Carolyn Berger, Jack B. Jacobs, John W. Noble (Note: Vice Chancellor of Delaware Court of Chancery, sitting by designation)

Pipher v. Parsell is a case that was decided before the Supreme Court of Delaware. It shows that a minor can be held to an adult standard of care when engaging in inherently dangerous activities such as driving.

== Facts ==
As they were traveling at 55 mph, Beisel unexpectedly seized the steering wheel of the pickup truck, prompting an immediate and dangerous deviation from their path. This initial act of taking control of the wheel was met with surprise by the occupants, yet it was not the last. Despite the initial shock and the laughter that followed what seemed like a jest, the situation escalated. A short while later, Beisel, in a repeat of her earlier action, again grabbed the steering wheel. This time, her actions resulted in the vehicle veering off the road and descending an embankment, ultimately leading to a collision with a tree.

This second, more serious intervention by Beisel had significant consequences. Pipher, the passenger seated in the middle, sustained injuries from the crash and subsequently initiated legal proceedings against the driver, Parsell. In his testimony, Parsell recounted the sequence of events, emphasizing the unexpected nature of Beisel's initial maneuver that led to the truck veering onto the road's shoulder. Despite the initial instance of Beisel's interference, which had placed Parsell on high alert, he confessed to not anticipating a recurrence of her perilous actions.

The incident, marked by Beisel's unexpected actions and the subsequent crash down an embankment, underscored the unforeseen dangers that led to the legal dispute following the injuries Pipher sustained. This detailed account illustrates the critical moments and decisions that precipitated the traffic collision.

== Holding ==
In an opinion written by Justice Holland, the court held that the plaintiff's evidence should have been submitted to the jury because the accident might have been foreseeable.

"In general, where the actions of a passenger that cause an accident are not foreseeable, there is no negligence attributable to the driver. But, when actions of a passenger that interfere with the driver's safe operation of the motor vehicle are foreseeable, the failure to prevent such conduct may be a breach of the driver's duty to either other passengers or to the public. Under the circumstances of this case, a reasonable jury could find that Parsell breached his duty to protect Pipher from Beisel by preventing Beisel from grabbing the steering wheel a second time."

The case was reversed and remanded.

== See also ==
- Duty of care
- Standard of care
- Foreseeability
- Contributory negligence
- Tort law
- Delaware Supreme Court
