= André Bouchard =

André Bouchard may refer to:

- André Bouchard (environmentalist) (1946–2010), Canadian environmentalist
- André Bouchard (policeman) (born 1950), Canadian policeman
- Andre Bouchard (judge), American judge from Delaware
