= Kathaleen McCormick =

American lawyer and judge (born 1979)

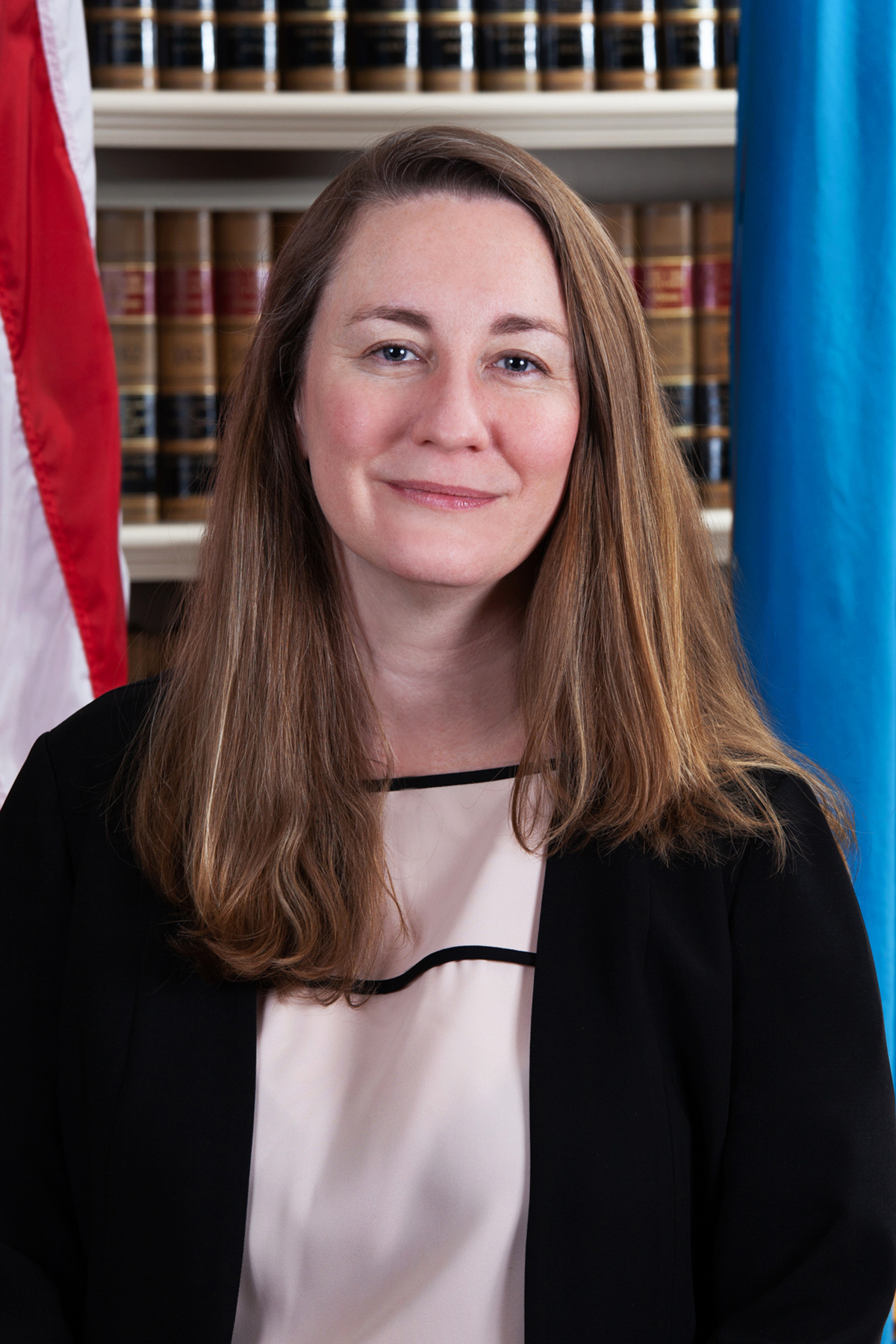
- McCormick in 2019

Chancellor of the Delaware Court of Chancery
- Incumbent
- Assumed office May 6, 2021
- Appointed by: John Carney
- Preceded by: Andre Bouchard

Vice Chancellor of the Delaware Court of Chancery
- In office November 1, 2018 – May 6, 2021
- Appointed by: John Carney
- Preceded by: Seat established
- Succeeded by: Lori W. Will

Personal details
- Born: Kathaleen Saint Jude McCormick; 1979 (age 46–47)
- Education: Harvard University (AB); University of Notre Dame (JD)
- Known for: Twitter v. Musk; Tornetta v. Musk

Kathaleen Saint Jude McCormick (born 1979) is an American lawyer and judge on the Delaware Court of Chancery, first as a vice chancellor from 2018 to 2021 and then as the current chancellor since 2021. She is the first female chancellor in Delaware history.

== Career ==
McCormick was born in Dover, Delaware, and grew up in Smyrna, Delaware. She earned a Bachelor of Arts in philosophy from Harvard University, and her Juris Doctor from Notre Dame Law School in 2004. She began her career as a staff attorney with the Community Legal Aid Society, a legal aid organization. She then went into private practice at Wilmington law firm Young Conaway Stargatt & Taylor, where she became a partner. At Young Conaway, she specialized in corporate and alternative entity law.

In September 2018, Governor John Carney nominated McCormick and Morgan Zurn to two new vice-chancellor positions on the Delaware Court of Chancery. These appointments raised the total number of judicial officers on the court from five to seven, the first such expansion since 1989. Carney noted that McCormick's experience would make her "an immediate asset to the court." She was confirmed by the Delaware Senate on October 3 and took office on November 1.

In April 2021, she was nominated by Delaware Governor John Carney as Chancellor of the Delaware Court of Chancery, after Chancellor Andre Bouchard announced he would step down before the end of his 12-year term. The Delaware Senate confirmed McCormick, and she began her 12-year term on May 6. McCormick is the first woman to lead the court since it was established in 1792.

=== Notable cases ===
On April 30, 2021, McCormick issued a post-trial decision in Snow Phipps Group, LLC v. KCAKE Acquisition, Inc. The case was among the first "busted deal" cases that emerged as mergers and acquisitions buyers sought to avoid closing mergers after the COVID-19 pandemic negatively impacted the businesses of many merger targets. The plaintiffs were Snow Phipps Group, LLC, a private equity firm, and DecoPac Holdings Inc., the parent company of a supplier of cake decorating products to supermarkets. After the COVID-19 pandemic negatively impacted KCake's business, the buyer, Kohlberg & Co. (through its acquisition vehicle KCAKE Acquisition, Inc.), sought to avoid its contractual obligation to complete a $550 million acquisition of DecoPac. McCormick rejected Kohlberg's arguments that the COVID-19 pandemic resulted in a material adverse effect or a breach of the ordinary course of business covenant in the merger agreement by the plaintiffs, then held that Kohlberg had breached its contractual obligation to use its "reasonable best efforts" to obtain financing for the transaction. McCormick then ordered Kohlberg to close the transaction.

On July 13, 2022, McCormick was assigned to adjudicate the merger dispute between Twitter, Inc. and Elon Musk, Twitter v. Musk. Over Musk's objections, McCormick granted Twitter's motion for expedited treatment of the lawsuit and set a trial date for October 2022. Twitter asked the court to enter an order of specific performance, effectively forcing Musk to close the deal. The Associated Press noted that in the KCAKE case in 2021, McCormick had granted the same relief that Twitter sought, forcing the buyer in that case to close the transaction. After multiple legal commentators warned that he had a slim chance of success, Musk told the court in October 2022 that he intended to proceed with the transaction. The deal closed on October 27, 2022. The Associated Press credited McCormick's "no-nonsense approach" with keeping the court fight from becoming "a circus".

In January 2024, McCormick voided Elon Musk's $55.8 billion Tesla pay package in the case of Tornetta v. Musk The lawsuit, filed in 2018 by Tesla shareholder Richard Tornetta, who owned nine shares, alleged that Tesla's board breached its fiduciary duties by approving Musk’s compensation package. The package had been approved by Tesla shareholders in 2018 with about 73% of votes cast, excluding shares owned by Musk and his brother Kimbal, but McCormick found that Musk controlled Tesla for purposes of the transaction, so the plan was reviewed for entire fairness, and that the stockholder vote had not been fully informed because the proxy statement omitted material information, which left the burden on the defendants to prove the plan was fair. She called the compensation "an unfathomable sum" that was unfair to shareholders. In June 2024, following the court decision, Tesla shareholders reapproved the package with about 77% support. However, McCormick reaffirmed her decision in December 2024, rejecting the argument that the second vote ratified the package, in part because a stockholder vote alone cannot ratify a conflicted-controller transaction and the proxy statement contained material misstatements. In connection with the case, the plaintiff's attorneys initially sought a fee award of $5.6 billion, representing 29 million shares of Tesla stock, but McCormick awarded them $345 million, which the defendants could pay in cash or freely tradable Tesla shares. In December 2025, the Delaware Supreme Court reversed McCormick's remedy rescinding Musk's compensation package, reinstating the 2018 plan and awarding $1 in nominal damages, without addressing her liability findings, and cut the plaintiff's attorneys' fee award from $345 million to no more than $54.5 million. After McCormick's January 2024 ruling, Tesla shareholders voted in June 2024 to move the company's incorporation from Delaware to Texas, with about 63% of outstanding shares in favor. Reuters reported in May 2025 that five companies valued at over $1 billion, including Tesla, Dropbox, and Trump Media, had left Delaware since 2024 and that nine more faced shareholder votes on doing so, a trend nicknamed "DExit", and that Delaware had responded in March 2025 with legislation limiting judges' role in reviewing certain corporate deals and narrowing books-and-records requests. Reuters later reported that Andreessen Horowitz had also switched its legal home out of Delaware, and Bloomberg Law wrote that the overhaul was aimed at restoring the Court of Chancery's "foundering reputation with corporate insiders", while retired University of Delaware law professor Charles Elson said the court was "at an inflection point".
