= Delaware Corporate and Commercial Litigation Blog =

Blog

The Delaware Corporate and Commercial Litigation Blog
- Website type: Blog
- Available in: English
- Creator: Francis G.X. Pileggi
- Website: http://www.delawarelitigation.com
- Launched: April 2005
- Current status: online

The Delaware Corporate and Commercial Litigation Blog provides free summaries of Delaware corporate and commercial court decisions from the state's Court of Chancery and Supreme Court. In addition to links to the actual opinions of the court, it provides links to commentary by scholars from around the United States on Delaware corporate law and alternative business entities.

This site is listed on the Harvard Law School Forum on Corporate Governance blogroll. Its reports have been mentioned by The Wall Street Journal online as one of the top national daily law blog stories. It was selected as a "top blog" by LexisNexis.

== See also ==
- Delaware Journal of Corporate Law
- Delaware Supreme Court
- Delaware Court of Chancery
- Delaware General Corporation Law.
