= John Vining =

American politician (1758–1802)

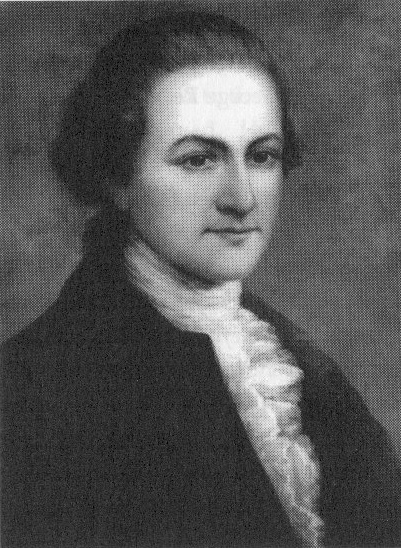

United States Senator from Delaware
- In office March 4, 1793 – January 19, 1798
- Preceded by: Richard Bassett
- Succeeded by: Joshua Clayton

Member of the U.S. House of Representatives from Delaware's at-large district
- In office March 4, 1789 – March 3, 1793
- Preceded by: District established (Note: Under the Delaware Constitution of 1776.)
- Succeeded by: John Patten

Continental Congressman from Delaware
- In office April 8, 1784 – October 27, 1786
- Preceded by: James Tilton
- Succeeded by: Nathaniel Mitchell

Member of the Delaware House of Representatives
- In office January 3, 1799 – January 3, 1800

Member of the Delaware Senate
- In office January 1, 1793 – January 7, 1794
- Preceded by: District established (Note: Under the Delaware Constitution of 1792.)
- Succeeded by: James Sykes
- In office January 3, 1800 – February 1802
- Preceded by: George Cummins
- Succeeded by: George Truitt

Personal details
- Born: December 23, 1758 Dover, Delaware Colony, British America
- Died: February 1802 (aged 43) Dover, Delaware, U.S.
- Party: Federalist
- Spouse: Anna Maria Seton
- Profession: Lawyer
- Nickname: Jack

John Middleton Vining (December 23, 1758 – February 1802) was an American lawyer and politician from Dover, in Kent County, Delaware. He was a Continental Congressman from Delaware, and a member of the Federalist Party, who served in the Delaware General Assembly and as United States Representative and United States Senator from Delaware.

== Early life and family ==
Vining was born in Dover in the Delaware Colony, son of John and Phoebe Wynkoop Vining. His father was a prominent and successful lawyer and landholder, who had been a Speaker of the Colonial Assembly and Chief Justice of Delaware. He was also the good friend of Caesar Rodney, who stood as godfather for his son John, the subject of this article. Vining's father died when his son was eleven years old, and from him John and his sister inherited a large fortune. On November 29, 1790, while he was a U.S. Representative in New York City, he married Anna Maria Seton, a poet, musician, and daughter of William Seton of New York. She fit well into Vining's social circle, and they had four sons, John, William, Benjamin and Charles, but she died prematurely in 1800.

== Political career ==
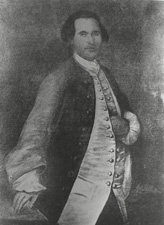

Vining studied law under George Read in New Castle, Delaware, and was admitted to the Delaware Bar in 1782, starting a practice in Dover. Because of his family's wealth and prominence he was elected three times to represent Delaware in the Continental Congress. First elected April 8, 1784, he served until October 27, 1786, although, like many of his contemporaries, his attendance was irregular. He was then elected to the 1787/88 and 1788/89 sessions of the Delaware House of Assembly.

In a special election on January 7, 1789, Vining defeated four other candidates to win election as the only member from Delaware to the 1st U.S. House of Representatives. Two years later he was re-elected to a second term. Although he arrived weeks late for every session, he was an energetic and conscientious legislator, consistently voting in support of the administration, particularly favoring a strong executive. He served on thirty-eight committees in the 1st U.S. House, including the committee considering the first proposed amendments to the Constitution, and the joint committee on rules.

Vining's positions were generally loose-constructionist, or Hamiltonian. Accordingly, he strongly favored the federal assumption of the state's revolutionary war debts. In the debate over the location of a national capital, he sought consideration for Wilmington, Delaware, but once that lost, supported an immediate move to Philadelphia, and the later construction of a city on the Potomac River.

In 1793 he returned to Dover, Delaware as a State Senator, but was soon elected to the U.S. Senate. He served there for five years, from March 4, 1793, until his resignation on January 19, 1798, and subsequent retirement from public life.

== Death and legacy ==
Vining died in Dover and is buried in an unmarked grave in the Christ Episcopal Church Cemetery at Dover.

Vining was a handsome, friendly, and outspoken member of a prominent and wealthy family. He was described as a "colorful", speaker who "brandished a florid metaphor", but also as "verbose" and "not above resorting to inflammatory language". His sister, Mary, who was a frequent companion of Anthony Wayne, lived with Vining, and together they entertained frequently and lavishly. Because of this hospitality and generosity he was known as "the pet of Delaware". But he spent through his fortune and suffering from alcoholism, and the death of his wife, went through a rapid decline on the way to an impoverished and premature death. His sister dedicated herself to raising Vining's four sons, but they died young as well, within a year of her death in 1821.

Elizabeth Montgomery in her Reminiscences in Wilmington wrote: "His brilliant talents, not nourished by application, withered in the bud. Indolence and generosity engendered extravagance that wasted his substance".

== Almanac ==
Elections were held October 1. Members of the General Assembly took office on October 20 or the following weekday. The State Councilmen were elected for a three-year term and the State Assemblymen for a one-year term. They chose the Continental Congressmen for a one-year term. U.S. Representatives took office March 4 and have a two-year term. The General Assembly chose the U.S. Senators, who took office March 4 for a six-year term.

After 1792 elections were moved to the first Tuesday of October and members of the General Assembly took office on the first Tuesday of January. The Legislative Council was renamed the State Senate and the House of Assembly was renamed the State House of Representatives.

Public offices
Office	Type	Location	Began office	Ended office	Notes
Continental Congressman	Legislature	Annapolis	April 8, 1784	June 3, 1784	never served
Continental Congressman	Legislature	Trenton	November 1, 1784	December 24, 1784	
Continental Congressman	Legislature	New York	January 11, 1785	November 4, 1785	
Continental Congressman	Legislature	New York	November 7, 1785	October 27, 1786	
State Assemblymen	Legislature	Dover	October 20, 1787	October 20, 1788	
State Assemblymen	Legislature	Dover	October 20, 1788	October 20, 1789	
U.S. Representative	Legislature	New York	March 4, 1789	March 3, 1791	
U.S. Representative	Legislature	Philadelphia	March 4, 1791	March 3, 1793	
State Senator	Legislature	Dover	January 1, 1793	January 7, 1794	
U.S. Senator	Legislature	Philadelphia	March 4, 1793	January 19, 1798	
State Representative	Legislature	Dover	January 3, 1799	January 3, 1800	
State Senator	Legislature	Dover	January 3, 1800	February 1802	died in office

Delaware General Assembly service
Dates	Assembly	Chamber	Majority	Governor	Committees	District
1787/88	12th	State House	non-partisan	Thomas Collins		Kent at-large
1788/89	13th	State House	non-partisan	Thomas Collins		Kent at-large
1793	17th	State Senate	Federalist	Joshua Clayton		Kent at-large
1799	23rd	State House	Federalist	Richard Bassett		Kent at-large
1800	24th	State Senate	Federalist	Richard Bassett		Kent at-large
1801	25th	State Senate	Federalist	Richard Bassett		Kent at-large
1802	26th	State Senate	Federalist	David Hall		Kent at-large

United States congressional service
Dates	Congress	Chamber	Majority	President	Committees	Class/District	Notes
1789–1791	1st	U.S. House	Pro-Administration	George Washington		at-large	
1791–1793	2nd	U.S. House	Pro-Administration	George Washington		at-large	
1793–1795	3rd	U.S. Senate	Pro-Administration	George Washington		class 2	
1795–1797	4th	U.S. Senate	Federalist	George Washington		class 2	
1797–1799	5th	U.S. Senate	Federalist	John Adams		class 2	(Note: Resigned January 19, 1798,)

Election results
Year	Office	Subject	Party	Votes	%	Opponent	Party	Votes	%	notes
1788	U.S. Representative	John Vining	non-partisan	898	44%	Rhoads Shankland	non-partisan	491	24%	(Note: This was a special election held January 7, 1789. Other candidates were Gunning Bedford Jr. (received 308 votes), Joshua Clayton (272 votes), and Allen McLane (90 votes).)
1790	U.S. Representative	John Vining	non-partisan	252	50%	Joshua Clayton	non-partisan	145	29%	

== Vining family ==
- Captain Benjamin Vining (1685–1735), port collector in Salem and Marblehead, Massachusetts
  - Married first, Ann
  - Married second, Mary Middleton. She married secondly Nicholas Greenberry Ridgely (1674–1755), and were parents of Dr. Charles Greenberry Ridgely
    - John Vining (1724–1770), married Phoebe Wynkoop (Note: Roger Martin, in Delawareans in Congress, names the wife of John Vining Sr. as Rachel Ridgely.)
      - Mary "Polly" Vining (1756–1821)
      - John Middleton Vining (1758–1802), married Anna Maria Seton
        - John Vining (1791–1817), U.S. Navy
        - William Henry Vining (1794–1822), lawyer
        - Benjamin Vining (c. 1796 – 1822) U.S. Army
        - Charles Ridgely Vining (1798–1821)
    - Mary "Polly" Vining (born c. 1730), married the Rev. Charles Inglis
    - Benjamin Vining (c. 1730 – 1785)

== Literature ==
- Martin, Roger A. (1995). Memoirs of the Senate. Newark: Roger A. Martin.
- Martin, Roger A. (2003). Delawareans in Congress: The House of Representatives, Vol. One 1789–1900. Newark: Roger A. Martin. ISBN 0-924117-26-5.
- Munroe, John A. (2004). The Philadelawareans. Newark: University of Delaware Press. ISBN 0-87413-872-8.
- Munroe, John A. (1954). Federalist Delaware 1775-1815. New Brunswick: Rutgers University.
- Wilson, W. Emerson (1969). Forgotten Heroes of Delaware. Cambridge, MA: Deltos Publishing Company.

== Images ==
- Martin, Roger A. (2003). Delawareans in Congress: The House of Representatives, Vol. One 1789–1900. Portrait courtesy of the Delaware Public Archives.
- Biographical Directory of the United States Congress

U.S. House of Representatives
New district	Member of the U.S. House of Representatives from Delaware's at-large congressional district March 4, 1789 – March 4, 1793	Succeeded by John Patten
U.S. Senate
Preceded by Richard Bassett	U.S. senator (Class 2) from Delaware; March 4, 1793 – January 19, 1798; Served alongside: George Read, Henry Latimer	Succeeded by Joshua Clayton
