= 1789 United States House of Representatives election in Delaware =

- January 7, 1789
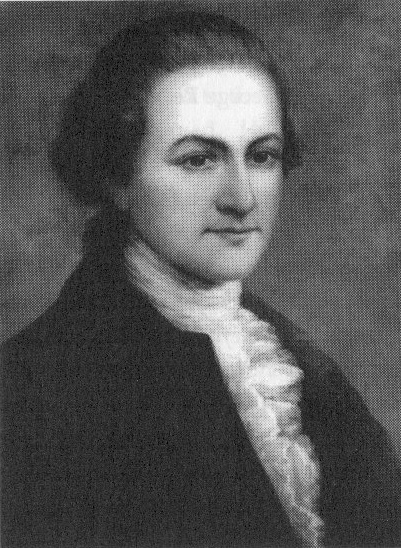

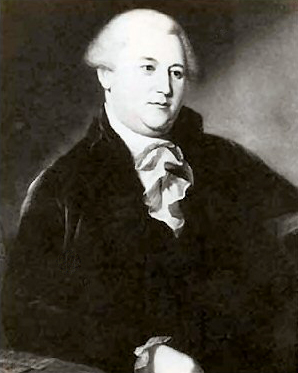

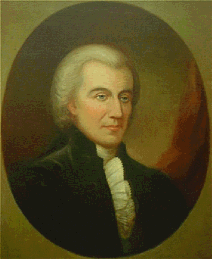
Nominee	John Vining	Rhoads Shankland
Party	Pro-Administration	Anti-Administration
Popular vote	898	491
Percentage	43.61%	23.85%
Nominee	Gunning Bedford Jr.	Joshua Clayton
Party	Pro-Administration	Pro-Administration
Popular vote	308	272
Percentage	14.96%	13.21%
Elected U.S. Representative
John Vining
Anti-Administration

The 1789 United States House of Representatives election in Delaware was held on January 7, 1789. The former Continental Congressman John Vining won the election and became Delaware's first Representative to the House of Representatives.

== Results ==
1789 United States House of Representatives election in Delaware
Party	Candidate	Votes	%
Pro-Administration	John Vining	898	43.61%
Anti-Administration	Rhoads Shankland	491	23.85%
Pro-Administration	Gunning Bedford Jr.	308	14.96%
Pro-Administration	Joshua Clayton	272	13.21
Independent	Allen MacLean	90	4.37%
Total votes		2,059	100%

== See also ==
- 1788–89 United States House of Representatives elections
- List of United States representatives from Delaware
