= 1792 Delaware gubernatorial election =

- October 2, 1792
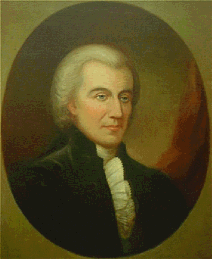

Nominee	Joshua Clayton	Thomas Montgomery	George Mitchell
Party	Federalist	Anti-Federalist	Anti-Federalist
Popular vote	2,352	1,902	458
Percentage	48.35%	41.63%	10.02%
- County results Clayton: 50–60% Montgomery: 60–70%
Governor before election
Joshua Clayton (Note: As president of Delaware)
Federalist
Elected Governor
Joshua Clayton
Federalist

The 1792 Delaware gubernatorial election was held on October 2, 1792. It was the first popular gubernatorial election following ratification of the Delaware Constitution of 1792. The Federalist incumbent president of Delaware Joshua Clayton defeated the Anti-Federalist former delegate to the Delaware constitutional convention Thomas Montgomery and the Anti-Federalist councilor George Mitchell.

== General election ==
=== Results ===
1792 Delaware gubernatorial election
Party	Candidate	Votes	%
Federalist	Joshua Clayton (incumbent)	2,209	48.35
Anti-Federalist	Thomas Montgomery	1,902	41.63
Anti-Federalist	George Mitchell	458	10.02
Total votes		4,569	100.00
Federalist hold			

=== Results by county ===
1792 Delaware gubernatorial election by county
County	John Clayton Federalist		Thomas Montgomery Anti-Federalist		George Mitchel Anti-Federalist		Margin (Note: In Kent and New Castle counties, the margin is the vote for Clayton minus the vote for Montgomery. In Sussex County, where Mitchel ran ahead of Montgomery by 73 votes, the margin is the vote for Clayton minus the vote for Mitchel.)		Total
County	#	%	#	%	#	%	#	%	Total
Kent	945	57.3	702	42.5	3	0.2	243	14.8	1,650
New Castle	382	31.8	819	68.1	1	0.1	-437	-36.3	1,202
Sussex	882	51.4	381	22.2	454	26.4	428	25.0	1,717
TOTAL	2,209	48.3	1,902	41.6	458	10.0	307	6.7	4,569

== Bibliography ==
- Dubin, Michael J. (2003). United States Gubernatorial Elections, 1776-1860: The Official Results by State and County. Jefferson, NC: McFarland and Company. ISBN 978-0-7864-1439-0.
- Lampi, Philip J. (2012). "Delaware 1792 Governor". A New Nation Votes. American Antiquarian Society.
