= Hanby =

Hanby may refer to:

- Benjamin Hanby, American composer
- Florence Wood Hanby, American politician
- Hanbi, a mythological god of evil
- Hanby, Lincolnshire, a hamlet on the line of the Roman Road called King Street
