= 1790 United States House of Representatives election in Delaware =

- November 8, 1790
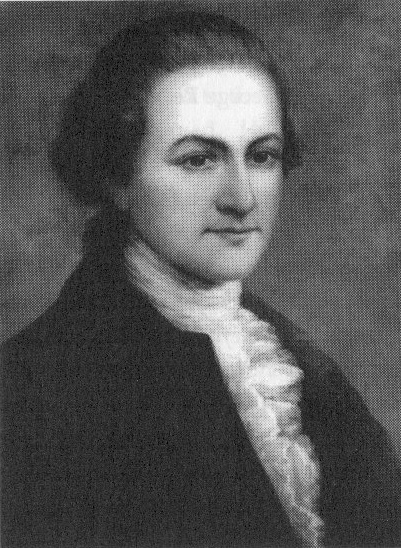

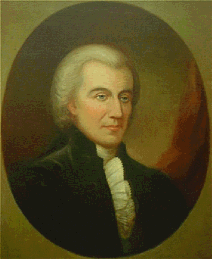

Nominee	John Vining	Joshua Clayton
Party	Pro-Administration	Pro-Administration
Popular vote	252	145
Percentage	49.70%	28.60%
Nominee	Thomas Duff
Party	Independent
Popular vote	104
Percentage	20.51%
U.S. Representative before election
John Vining
Pro-Administration
Elected U.S. Representative
John Vining
Pro-Administration

The 1790 United States House of Representatives election in Delaware was held on November 8, 1790. The former Continental Congressman John Vining won reelection.

== Results ==
1790 United States House of Representatives election in Delaware
Party	Candidate	Votes	%
Pro-Administration	John Vining (incumbent)	252	49.70%
Pro-Administration	Joshua Clayton	145	28.60%
Independent	Thomas Duff	104	20.51%
Independent	John Banning	2	0.39%
Pro-Administration	Nathaniel Mitchell	2	0.39%
Independent	John Gordon	1	0.20%
Independent	William Perry	1	0.20%
Total votes		507	100.00%
