= Kensey Johns (judge) =

American judge (1759–1848)

Kensey Johns III
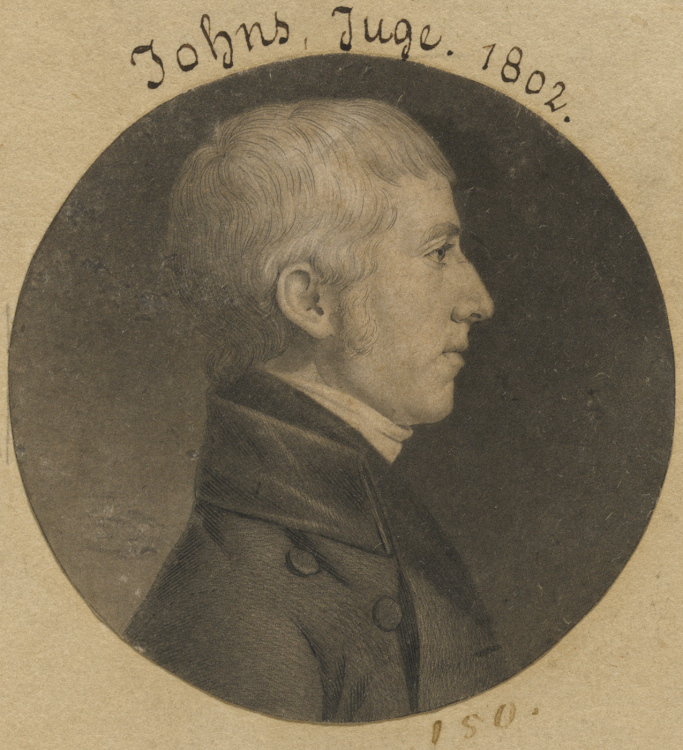
- Supreme Court Chief Justice of Delaware

Chief Justice of Delaware Supreme Court
- In office 1798–1830
- Preceded by: Richard H. Bayard
- Succeeded by: Samuel M. Harrington

Chancellor of Delaware
- In office 1830–1832
- Preceded by: Nicholas Ridgely
- Succeeded by: Kensey Johns Jr.

Personal details
- Born: June 14, 1759 Sudley, Anne Arundel County, Maryland
- Died: December 21, 1848 (aged 89) New Castle, Delaware
- Resting place: Immanuel Church, New Castle, Delaware
- Spouse: Nancy Ann Van Dyke
- Children: Kensey Johns Jr., John Johns

Kensey Johns III (June 14, 1759 – December 21, 1848) was a lawyer, politician, jurist and plantation owner from Delaware.

== Early life and family ==
Johns was born at Sudley Plantation in Anne Arundel County, Maryland, on June 14, 1759, the son of Kensey Johns II and Susannah Galloway. . In his early years, he participated as a minuteman in the American Revolution and studied law with Samuel Chase and George Read.

In 1784, Johns married Ann Van Dyke, the daughter of Nicholas Van Dyke, the Governor of Delaware. George Washington was a guest at the wedding, and the home in which they were wed is preserved as a museum house in New Castle. Their children included Ann Johns (1787–1874), Susannah Johns Stewart (1789–1862), Kensey Johns (1791–1857), Rt. Rev. John Johns (1796–1876) and Rev. Henry Van Dyke Johns (1803–1859).

== Career ==
He was admitted to the Delaware bar and practiced law for over a decade before being appointed an associate judge of the Delaware Court of Appeals (which later became the Delaware Supreme Court. In 1792, he was a member of the Delaware Constitutional Convention.

== Senate appointment and rejection ==
On September 18, 1793, Read resigned his seat in the United States Senate. The Delaware General Assembly deadlocked on the appointment of a replacement. Finally, with the state legislature still in session but still deadlocked, Governor Joshua Clayton appointed Johns to fill the seat on March 19, 1794. He presented his credentials to Congress on March 24, 1794. Less than a month before, the Republicans in the Senate had seen one of their favorites, Albert Gallatin, unseated as failing to meet the minimum nine years citizenship constitutionally required of a U.S. senator, and they took the opportunity for revenge. Johns's credentials were immediately questioned and referred to committee. The United States Constitution permitted a state governor to fill a vacancy, but only when the state legislature was in recess. Since this was not the case, the committee reported back two days later that Johns was not qualified to take a seat in the Senate, and two days after that, the full Senate agreed and denied Johns a seat.

== Later judicial career ==
When Read died in 1798, Johns succeeded him as chief justice of Delaware. He held that office until 1828 or 1830, when he became chancellor of Delaware. He held that post until the 1832 Constitution of Delaware became operative, at which point he was succeeded by his son, Kensey Johns Jr.

== Death and legacy ==
Johns died in New Castle, Delaware, on December 21, 1848, and his son Kensey Johns would also die before the American Civil War, and be buried in the family plot at Immanuel Episcopal Church on the Green in New Castle, Delaware. His son John Johns, the elder of the two sons who became Episcopal priests (whereas Kensey Jr. was a Presbyterian), would become a bishop in Virginia and supporter of the Confederate States of America. The Johns family lost their slaves after the war ended, but Delaware did not secede from the Union. Their ancestral home, Sudley, was listed on the National Register of Historic Places in 1973.

== Almanac ==
Public offices
Office	Type	Location	Began office	Ended office	Notes
Chief Justice	Judiciary	Dover	January 3, 1799	June 21, 1830	State Supreme Court
Chancellor	Judiciary	Dover	June 21, 1830	June 18, 1832	State Chancery Court

== See also ==
- Sudley
