= Sudley (Deale, Maryland) =

Historic house in Maryland, United States

- U.S. National Register of Historic Places
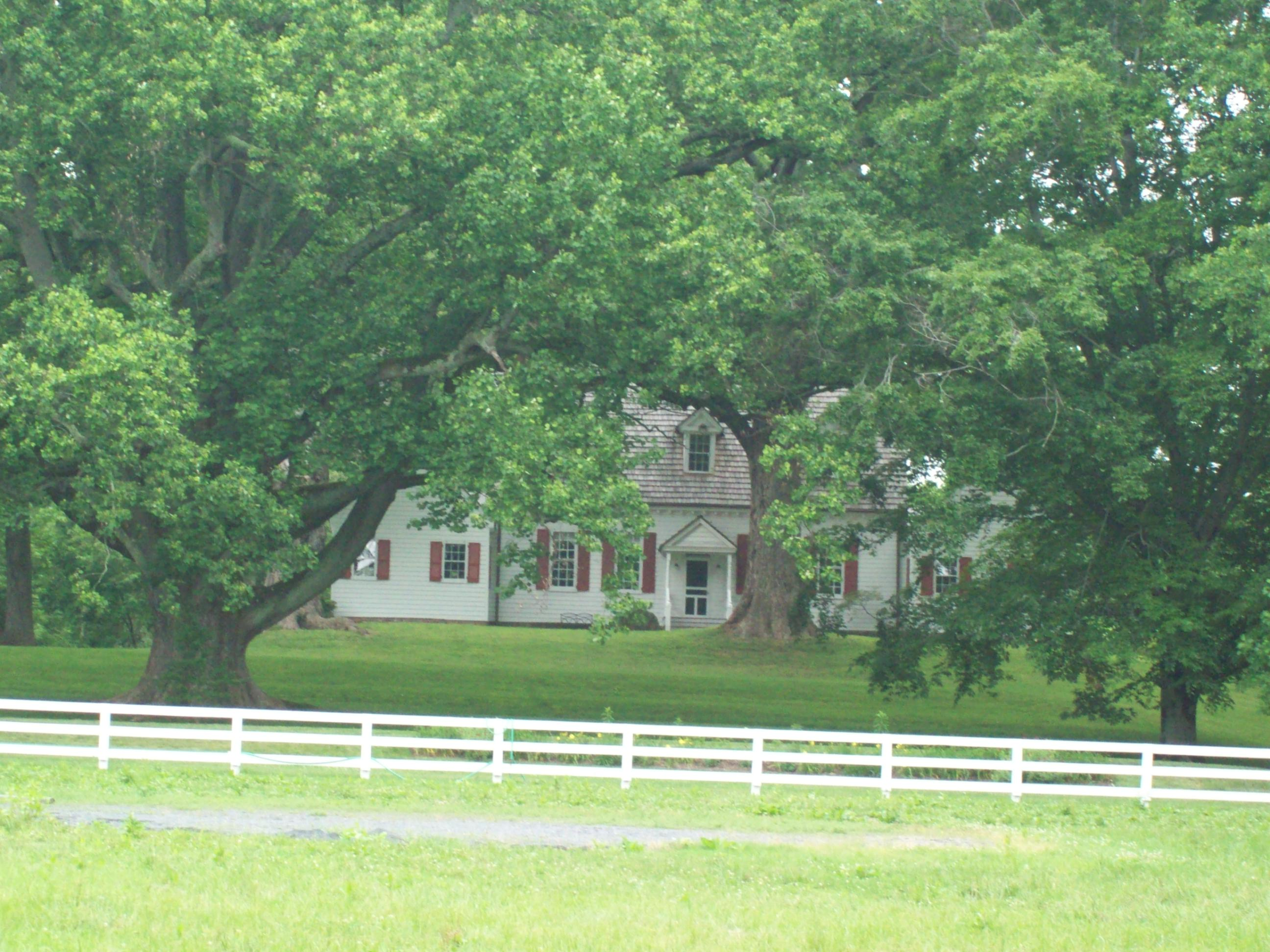
- Sudley, May 2010

- Location within Maryland Location within the United States
- Nearest city: Deale, Maryland, U.S.
- Coordinates: 38°49′15″N 76°34′18″W
- NRHP reference No.: 73000895
- Added to NRHP: June 18, 1973

Sudley is a historic home at Deale, Anne Arundel County, Maryland. It is a 1 1/2-story frame house with shorter perpendicular wings added. It is a grand hall-chamber house of the 1720–1730 period and retains a great deal of early finish. The house is typical of the Medieval Transitional style of architecture, and has undergone three significant renovations, one in the third quarter of the 18th century of Georgian-style, one about 1800, and finally a restoration in 1945.

The house is associated with Kensey Johns, Chief Justice of the Delaware Supreme Court, chancellor of Delaware, and a delegate to the Delaware Constitutional Convention from New Castle County, Delaware; John Johns, Bishop of Virginia and President of The College of William and Mary in Williamsburg, Virginia; the ancestors of Johns Hopkins, the Baltimore benefactor; and families associated generally with the county's Quaker heritage.

It was listed on the National Register of Historic Places in 1973.
