= Woodside (Mt. Pleasant, Delaware) =

Historic house in Delaware, United States

- U.S. National Register of Historic Places
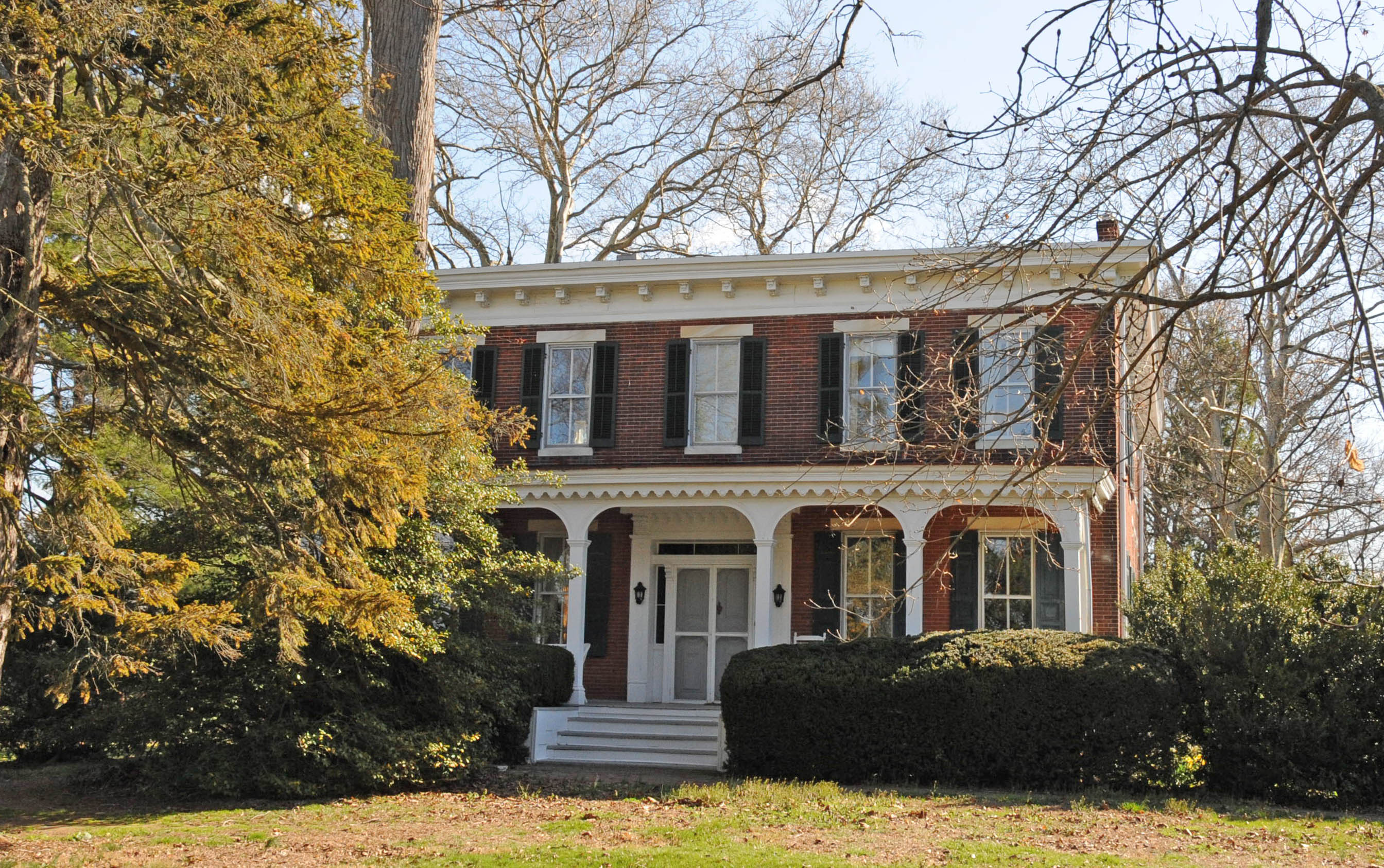

- Location within Delaware Location within the United States
- Location: 1358 Choptank Road, Mt. Pleasant, Delaware
- Coordinates: 39.506385°N 75.750375°W
- Area: 4 acres (1.6 ha)
- Built: c. 1860
- Architectural style: Greek Revival, Italianate, Federal
- MPS: Rebuilding St. Georges Hundred 1850-1880 TR
- NRHP reference No.: 85002119
- Added to NRHP: September 13, 1985

Woodside is a historic home located at Mt. Pleasant, New Castle County, Delaware. It was built about 1860, and is a two- to three-story, five-bay, L-shaped brick dwelling with a center passage plan with a full-width front porch. It features hipped roof with widely overhanging eaves and elaborate brackets in the Italianate style. Also on the property are a contributing stable, granary, cattle/dairy barn, equipment shed and water tower. It was built by Henry Clayton, whose great-grandfather was Governor Joshua Clayton, president and governor of Delaware.

It was listed on the National Register of Historic Places in 1985.
