= Lori W. Will =

American judge from Delaware

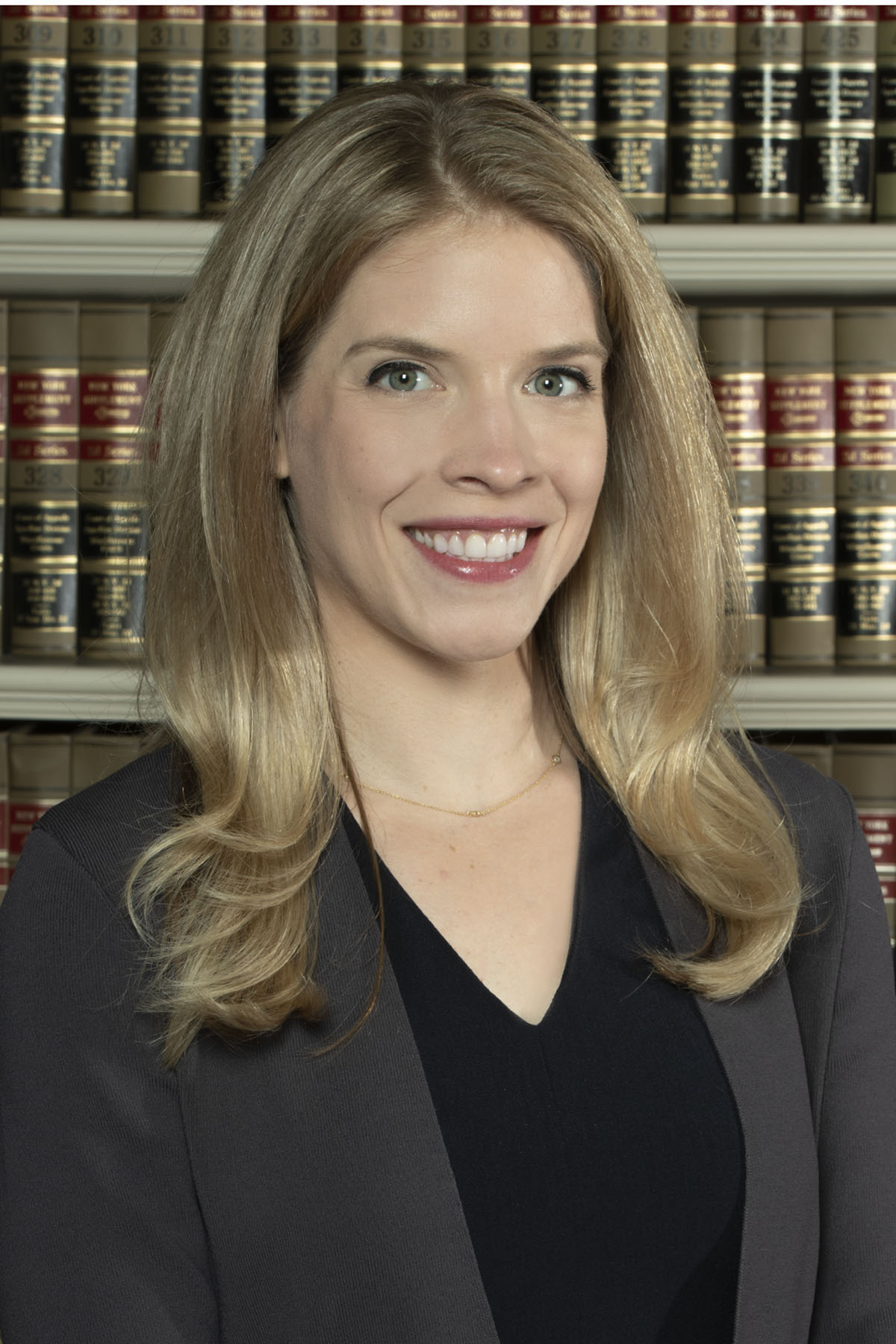

Vice Chancellor of the Delaware Court of Chancery
- Incumbent
- Assumed office May 26, 2021
- Appointed by: John Carney
- Preceded by: Kathaleen McCormick

Personal details
- Education: Lafayette College (B.A.); University of Pennsylvania Law School (JD)

Lori W. Will is an American lawyer and judge on the Delaware Court of Chancery.

== Career ==
Will received a Bachelor of Arts degree in history and government & law from Lafayette College and received her J.D. from the University of Pennsylvania Law School. She began her career as an associate at Skadden, Arps, Slate, Meagher & Flom before joining Wilson Sonsini Goodrich & Rosati as a partner.

In April 2021, Governor John Carney nominated Will to replace Vice Chancellor Kathaleen McCormick, whom Carney had nominated to serve as Chancellor. Vice Chancellor Will was sworn in on May 26, 2021.

=== Notable Cases ===
Will has presided over two influential cases involving SPACs. In January 2022, "in a case of first impression" under Delaware corporate law, she "held that the stockholders stated a plausible claim for breach of fiduciary duty, thus impairing stockholders' right to make an informed decision on whether to redeem their shares" in the de-SPAC transaction. She also held that the de-SPAC transaction was subject to "the entire fairness standard of review—and not the more lenient business judgment rule," citing "inherent conflicts between the SPAC's fiduciaries and the public stockholders in the context of a value-decreasing transaction." In January 2023, in "a ruling substantiating well-publicized contentions of Stanford Law Professor Michael Klausner about SPACs' structural flaws," Will again denied a motion to dismiss by defendants who were directors of a SPAC. Commentators questioned whether the decision would produce a "gold rush" of stockholder challenges to de-SPAC transactions.

In June 2023, Will dismissed a shareholder lawsuit over the Walt Disney Co.’s public opposition to legislation in Florida. She explained that Delaware law gives directors “significant discretion” to guide corporate strategy, including on social and political issues. Commentators described the decision as providing important guidance on the directors’ duties when considering corporate actions on social and political issues.

In April 2025, Will issued a warning about AI-generated pleadings, strongly cautioning a litigant about the use of generative AI that produced fictitious citations and a "hallucinated" legal authority. She noted that a motion to compel discovery contained a number of incorrect or fabricated case citations. The GenAI tool created fictitious quotes and merged elements of different cases. Will warned the litigant that submitting filings with fictitious citations could be sanctioned and went on to say that, while the use of GenAI is not forbidden, the misuse of these tools is serious. Will ordered that any future filings prepared using GenAI must include a sworn certification disclosing: that AI was used, identifying the tool and the sections of pleadings where it was used, and confirm that a human reviewed the output for accuracy.
