= Delaware Court of Chancery =

Court of equity in Delaware, United States

- Established: 1792
- Authorised by: Delaware Constitution art. IV
- Appeals to: Delaware Supreme Court
- Judge term length: 12 years
- Number of positions: 7
- Website: Official website

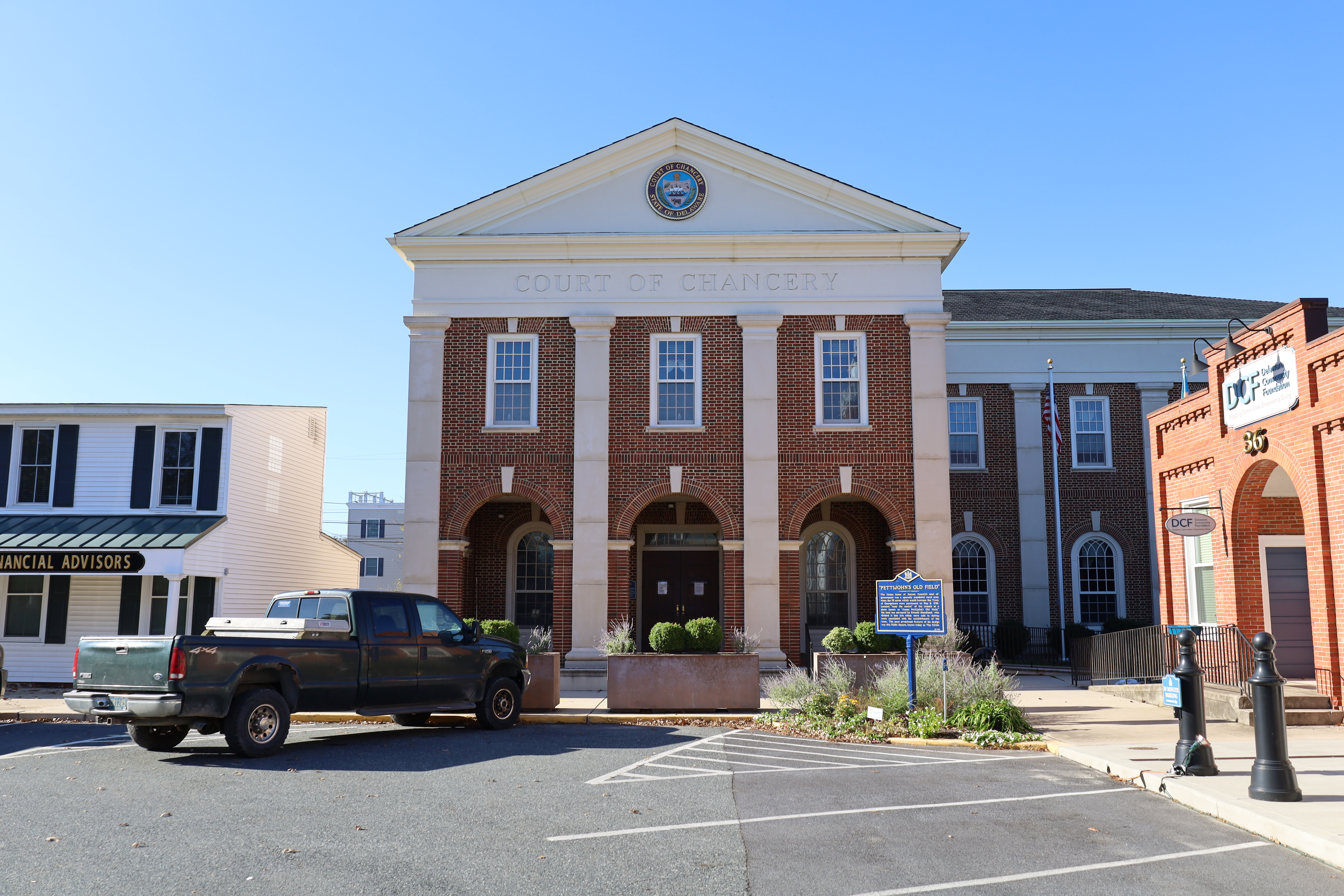
Courthouse in Georgetown, Delaware, one of the court's three locations

The Delaware Court of Chancery is a court of equity in the U.S. state of Delaware. It is one of Delaware's four constitutional courts, along with the Supreme Court, Family Court, and Superior Court. Until 1939, the court consisted of a single chancellor. Since 2018, the court has consisted of a chancellor and six vice-chancellors, with a 4-3 "major-party" rule. The court of equity was first established in 1792, in a constitution heavily influenced by the ideas of John Dickinson and George Read. The court sits without a jury, with cases tried before a chancellor or vice-chancellor. The court is known for being a hub for corporate governance litigation in the United States, as two-thirds of Fortune 500 companies are incorporated in Delaware. It is among the preeminent business courts in the world, with a more developed body of case law than other states.

== Connection to corporate law ==
Many companies prefer to incorporate in Delaware because of the state's corporate-friendly tax system and the court's historical expertise in business litigation. The court's judges tend to be longtime members of the Delaware State Bar Association who have spent their careers doing corporate litigation.

Because of the extensive experience of the Delaware courts, Delaware has a better-developed body of case law than other states, which serves to give corporations and their counsel greater guidance on matters of corporate governance and transaction liability issues. More than two-thirds of Fortune 500 companies are incorporated in the state. Delaware is the home to more than 1.8 million corporations, which is more than the number of residents in the state.

The Court of Chancery handles corporate internal affairs litigation (such as shareholder disputes and merger disputes) according to equitable powers under the Constitution and the Delaware General Corporation Law, the statute governing corporations in Delaware. As a result, it is a hub for corporate litigation in the United States.

== Judges ==
The chief judge is called the chancellor, and the other six judges are called vice-chancellors. The chancellor and vice-chancellors are nominated by the governor and confirmed by the state senate for 12-year terms. The court is subject to the "major-party" rule in the Delaware constitution. Also known as the political balance requirement, this requires that the bare majority of the court "shall be of one major political party" and the other judges "shall be of the other major political party". As a result, any person not affiliated with either the Republican or Democratic Party was formerly unable to serve on the court, until a consent decree ending a lawsuit by an unaffiliated judicial applicant led to the termination of the rule.

== Jurisdiction ==
The Court's jurisdiction is a hybrid of constitutional provisions, statutes, and case law.

According to the Delaware Judicial Information Center:

The Court of Chancery has jurisdiction to hear and determine all matters and causes in equity. The general equity jurisdiction of the Court is measured in terms of the general equity jurisdiction of the High Court of Chancery of Great Britain as it existed prior to the separation of the American colonies. The General Assembly may confer upon the Court of Chancery additional statutory jurisdiction. In today's practice, the litigation in the Court of Chancery consists largely of corporate matters, trusts, estates, and other fiduciary matters, disputes involving the purchase and sale of land, questions of title to real estate, and commercial and contractual matters in general. When issues of fact to be tried by a jury arise, the Court of Chancery may order such facts to trial by issues at the Bar of the Superior Court of Delaware. (10 Del. C., 369).

Article IV, Section 10 of the Delaware Constitution establishes the Court and provides that it "shall have all the jurisdiction and powers vested by the laws of this State in the Court of Chancery."

=== Equitable jurisdiction ===
Title 10, Section 341 of the Delaware Code states that the Court "shall have jurisdiction to hear and determine all matters and causes in equity." Subsequent decisions have held that the Court's equitable jurisdiction is "coextensive with, and in most respects, conformable" to that of the English High Court of Chancery at the time of American independence in 1776.

The Court's most significant power is its ability to issue preliminary and permanent injunctions and temporary restraining orders. This is frequently exercised in the context of disputes involving mergers and acquisitions or sales of corporations, wherein a corporate suitor or a shareholder will attempt to enjoin—that is, prevent—the sale or merger of a corporation, claiming that their stock value has been diluted or that they have superior rights to purchase the corporation. In a typical sale or merger dispute, a plaintiff will seek a temporary restraining order, sometimes on an ex parte basis, to prevent the transaction from taking place and preserve the status quo. If the Court grants that relief, the plaintiff will then seek a preliminary injunction to maintain the current state of affairs until a trial can take place.

Title 10, Section 342 of the Delaware Code provides that the Court shall not hear any matters for which an adequate remedy exists at law or which can be heard by any other Delaware court. As a practical matter, this means that the Court cannot grant relief in the form of money damages to compensate a party for a loss or where another court has coterminous jurisdiction. However, under the rules of equity, the court can grant monetary relief in the form of restitution by ruling that another party has unjustly gained money that belongs to the plaintiff.

Apart from its general equitable jurisdiction, the Court has jurisdiction over a number of other matters. First, the Court has sole power to appoint guardians of the property and person for mentally or physically disabled Delaware residents. Similarly, the Court may also appoint guardians for minors, although the Family Court has coterminous jurisdiction over such matters. Will contests and disputes over interpretations of trusts are also heard by the Court.

In 1952, the Court of Chancery and the Supreme Court held in Gebhart v. Belton, the only Brown court case filed in a state court, that the operation of segregated school systems in Delaware was unlawful, two full years before the U.S. Supreme Court would do so in Brown v. Board of Education.

== Procedure ==
The Chancellor is responsible for appointing a judge on the court to preside over a case.

The Court sits without a jury. All issues of fact are determined by the presiding Chancellor or Vice Chancellor. The Court has the discretion to appoint an advisory jury if it so desires, but this power is practically never exercised.

The Court of Chancery's decision can be appealed to the Delaware Supreme Court, whose decision is final unless appealed to the Supreme Court of the United States.

== History ==
The history of the Court of Chancery dates back to the English common law system, in which separate courts were established to hear law and equity matters. English law courts included the Court of King's Bench (or Queen's Bench when the monarch was female), the Court of Common Pleas, and the Court of the Exchequer. The sole English court of equity was the Court of Chancery.

Along with the remainder of the original Thirteen Colonies, Delaware imported the English concept of common law. This included establishing a separate Court of Chancery. As the legal system evolved in England, the English Court of Chancery was eventually abolished by the Judicature Acts of 1873 and 1875, and its powers were merged into what was then called The Supreme Court of Judicature (comprising the High Court and the Court of Appeal), which exercised jurisdiction in both common law and equity. This was prompted in part by similar reforms which had taken place elsewhere, notably the abolition of the New York Court of Chancery in 1847. Most American jurisdictions followed the reforms in New York and England.

In its first Constitution, the Delaware Constitution of 1776, there was no special provision for a court of equity. However, when the constitution was revised in the Delaware Constitution of 1792, a separate Court of Chancery was established. This constitution was heavily influenced by the thinking of John Dickinson and George Read. William T. Quillen and Michael Hanrahan, in their Short History of the Delaware Court of Chancery, repeat the "folklore of the Delaware bench and bar, saying that the impetus for creating a Court of Chancery was to provide a new judicial seat for Delaware's first Chancellor, William Killen." Killen was the elderly and highly respected incumbent Chief Justice of Delaware. When George Read was considered for the role of new Chief Justice, he refused unless adequate provisions were made for Killen. A separate Court of Chancery under Killen was the solution.

=== Constitution of 1792 ===
There was one chancellor, appointed by the governor for life.

Chancellors of Delaware
Name	Took office	Left office	Residence	Party
William Killen	October 6, 1793	December 6, 1801	Kent County	Democratic-Republican
Nicholas Ridgely	December 6, 1801	April 1, 1830	Kent County	Democratic-Republican
Kensey Johns Sr.	June 21, 1830	January 18, 1832	New Castle County	Whig

=== Constitution of 1831 ===
There was one chancellor, appointed by the governor for life.

Chancellors of Delaware
Name	Took office	Left office	Residence	Party
Kensey Johns Jr.	January 18, 1832	March 28, 1857	New Castle County	Whig
Samuel M. Harrington	May 4, 1857	November 28, 1865	Kent County	Democratic
Daniel M. Bates	December 12, 1865	October 1873	New Castle County	Democratic
Willard Saulsbury Sr.	November 14, 1873	April 6, 1892	Sussex County	Democratic
James L. Wolcott	May 5, 1892	September 5, 1895	Kent County	Democratic
John R. Nicholson	September 5, 1895	June 10, 1897	Kent County	Democratic

=== Constitution of 1897 ===
There is one chancellor, appointed by the governor for a 12-year term. There were also created over the years, additional vice chancellors, the first in 1939, a second in 1961, a third in 1984, and a fourth in 1989. Since 2018, there are six vice chancellors. They are also appointed by the governor for a 12-year term. They are required to be equally divided between the major political parties, so that among all the chancellors no party has a majority of more than one person.

Chancellors of Delaware
Name	Took office	Left office	Residence	Party
John R. Nicholson	June 10, 1897	June 10, 1909	Kent County	Democratic
Charles M. Curtis	June 10, 1909	July 2, 1921		Republican
Josiah O. Wolcott	July 2, 1921	November 11, 1938	Kent County	Democratic
William W. Harrington	December 7, 1938	1950		
Daniel F. Wolcott	1950	1951		Democratic
Collins J. Seitz	1951	July 17, 1966		
William Duffy	July 17, 1966	1973		
William T. Quillen	1973	1976		
William Marvel	September 1976	May 1, 1982		
Grover C. Brown	1982	1985		
William T. Allen	1985	1997		
William B. Chandler, III	1997	2011	Sussex County	Republican
Leo E. Strine Jr.	2011	2014	New Castle County	Democratic
Andre Bouchard	2014	2021		Democratic
Kathaleen McCormick	May 6, 2021	present		

Vice chancellors of Delaware
Name	Took office	Left office	Residence	Party	Seat
George B. Pearson Jr.	1939	1946			1st
Collins J. Seitz	1946	1951			1st
Howard W. Bramhall	1951	1954			1st
William Marvel	1954	1976			1st
Maurice A. Hartnett	1976	1994			1st
Myron T. Steele	1994	2000			1st
John W. Noble	November 2000	February 2016	Kent County	Democratic	1st
Joseph R. Slights III	March 28, 2016	2022	Kent County	Democratic	1st
Nathan A. Cook	July 21, 2022	present			1st
Isaac D. Short	1961	1973			2nd
Grover C. Brown	1973	1982			2nd
Joseph J. Longobardi	1982	1984			2nd
Joseph T. Walsh	1984	1985			2nd
Jack B. Jacobs	1985	2003			2nd
Donald F. Parsons	2003	2015		Democratic	2nd
Tamika Montgomery-Reeves	November 2015	November 2019	New Castle County	Democratic	2nd
Paul Fioravanti Jr.	January 15, 2020	present			2nd
Carolyn Berger	1984	1994			3rd
Bernard S. Balick	1994	1998			3rd
Leo E. Strine Jr.	1998	2011	New Castle County	Democratic	3rd
Sam Glasscock III	2011	2025	Sussex County	Republican	3rd
Bonnie David	2025	present	Sussex County		3rd
William B. Chandler III	1989	1997	Sussex County	Republican	4th
Stephen P. Lamb	1997	2009	New Castle County		4th
J. Travis Laster	October 9, 2009	present	New Castle County	Republican	4th
Morgan Zurn	October 4, 2018	2026	New Castle County	Republican	5th
Kathaleen McCormick	November 1, 2018	May 6, 2021	New Castle County	Democratic	6th
Lori W. Will	May 26, 2021	present			6th

The Court also employs three full-time Magistrates in Chancery (formerly known as Masters in Chancery), appointed by the Chancellor under Court of Chancery Rule 144. The Magistrates adjudicate cases assigned to them by the Court, with a particular focus on "the people's concerns in equity," such as guardianships, property disputes, and trust and estate matters. The current Magistrates in Chancery are Selena E. Molina, and Loren Mitchell.

== See also ==
- Court of equity
- Courts of Delaware
- Delaware corporation
- The Delaware Journal of Corporate Law
- Delaware Corporate and Commercial Litigation Blog
- New York Court of Chancery
- Michigan Court of Chancery
