= Kensey Johns Jr. =

American politician (1791–1857)

Kensey Johns IV
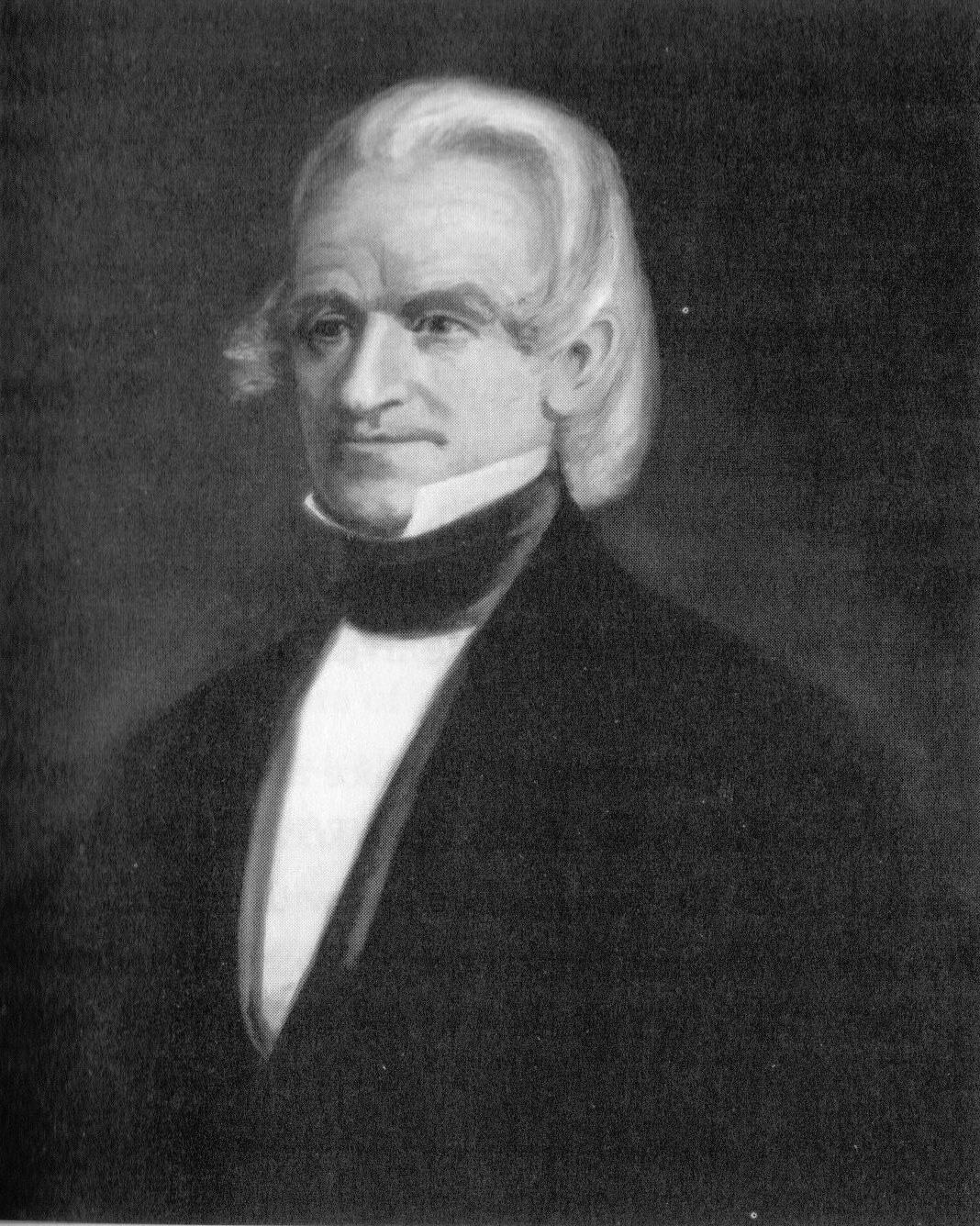

Chancellor of Delaware
- In office January 18, 1832 – March 28, 1857
- Preceded by: Kensey Johns
- Succeeded by: Samuel M. Harrington

Member of the U.S. House of Representatives from Delaware's at-large district
- In office October 2, 1827 – March 3, 1831
- Preceded by: Louis McLane
- Succeeded by: John J. Milligan

Personal details
- Born: December 10, 1791 New Castle, Delaware, U.S.
- Died: March 28, 1857 (aged 65) New Castle, Delaware, U.S.
- Party: Federalist; Whig
- Spouse: Maria
- Education: Princeton College
- Profession: Lawyer

Kensey Johns IV (December 10, 1791 – March 28, 1857) was an American lawyer and politician from Delaware. He was a member of the Federalist Party and later the Whig Party who served as U.S. Representative from Delaware.

== Early life and education ==
Johns was born in New Castle, Delaware, son of Delaware jurist and Chancellor Kensey Johns III and Nancy Anne Van Dyke, daughter of Nicholas Van Dyke, Governor (President) of Delaware. Growing up, he pursued classical studies and graduated from Princeton College in 1810.

He studied law with his uncle, Nicholas Van Dyke, and at the Litchfield Law School, was admitted to the Delaware Bar in 1813 and commenced the practice of law in New Castle.

== Career ==
Johns was elected to the 20th Congress to fill the vacancy caused by the appointment of Louis McLane to the U.S. Senate and McLane's consequent resignation. He was reelected to the 21st Congress and served from October 2, 1827, to March 3, 1831. (Note: The Sunday Morning Star erroneously claims that Johns "had served the state in both houses of Congress", but there is no record of his supposed service in the United States Senate.)

After the death of his father, he was appointed to take his place as Chancellor of Delaware in 1832. He served in this capacity for 25 years, until his own death in 1857. He also served as Presiding Judge of the Orphan's Court and Court of Errors and Appeals.

== Personal life ==
His wife was Maria Johns and his mother was Nancy Ann Van Dyke Johns, the daughter of former Delaware President Nicholas Van Dyke. They were members of the Presbyterian Church at New Castle. He was a slaveholder.

== Death and legacy ==
Johns died unexpectedly in New Castle, Delaware, while in office. He was buried in the Presbyterian Cemetery in New Castle.

He is said to have been "painstaking and laborious to a degree in his careful examination of questions, but was also notably prompt in making his decisions." He was known to have been a lawyer who would be "referring every case to some well-settled principle of law, rather than seeking to support it upon mere case authority. He not only laboriously, but conscientiously, sought to adjudge every case thus submitted, but also to draw upon therefrom well defined principles and rules of equity." Nevertheless, he was "notably prompt in making his decisions, seldom permitting the term to pass in making his determination."

== Almanac ==
Elections were held the first Tuesday of October. U.S. Representatives took office March 4 and have a two-year term.

Public offices
Office	Type	Location	Began office	Ended office	Notes
U.S. Representative	Legislature	Washington	October 2, 1827	March 3, 1831	
Chancellor	Judiciary	Dover	January 18, 1832	March 28, 1857	State Chancery Court

United States congressional service
Dates	Congress	Chamber	Majority	President	Committees	Class/District
1827–1829	20th	U.S. House	Democratic	John Quincy Adams		class 1
1829–1831	21st	U.S. House	Democratic	Andrew Jackson		class 1

Election results
Year	Office	Subject	Party	Votes	%	Opponent	Party	Votes	%
1828	U.S. Representative	Kensey Johns IV	Federalist	4,769	52%	James A. Bayard Jr.	Republican	4,347	48%

== Bibliography ==
- Martin, Roger A. (2003). Delawareans in Congress: The House of Representatives, Vol. One 1789-1900. Newark: Roger A. Martin. ISBN 0-924117-26-5.
- Martin, Roger A. (1995). Memoirs of the Senate. Newark: Roger A. Martin.
- Munroe, John A. (2004). The Philadelawareans. Newark: University of Delaware Press. ISBN 0-87413-872-8.
- Munroe, John A. (1954). Federalist Delaware 1775-1815. New Brunswick: Rutgers University.
- Ward, Christopher (1941). The Delaware Continentals. Wilmington, DE: Historical Society of Delaware. ISBN 0-924117-21-4.
- Wilson, W. Emerson (1969). Forgotten Heroes of Delaware. Cambridge, MA: Deltos Publishing Company.

U.S. House of Representatives
Preceded by Louis McLane	Member of the U.S. House of Representatives from Delaware's at-large congressional district October 2, 1827 – March 3, 1831	Succeeded by John J. Milligan
