= Delaware Compensation Commission =

The Delaware Compensation Commission submits recommendations regarding the base salaries of judges, lawmakers and other top government officials to the Delaware General Assembly at four yearly intervals. The General Assembly subsequently accepts or rejects these recommendations.

The commission was created in 1984 by legislation signed by then Governor Pierre S. du Pont, IV. Since its creation, the commission has submitted six reports with salary recommendations to the General Assembly with the following outcomes:

- 1985 report—accepted 1 February 1985
- 1989 report—accepted 1 February 1989
- 1993 report—recommendations rejected; salary adjustment legislation passed by General Assembly in April 1993
- 1997 report—accepted 1 February 1997
- 2001 report—accepted 1 February 2001
- 2005 report—accepted 1 February 2005
