= Andre Bouchard (judge) =

American judge from Delaware

Andre G. Bouchard

Chancellor of the Delaware Court of Chancery
- In office May 5, 2014 – May 6, 2021
- Appointed by: Jack Markell
- Preceded by: Leo E. Strine Jr.
- Succeeded by: Kathaleen McCormick

Personal details
- Education: Boston College (BA); Harvard University (JD)

Andre G. Bouchard is an American attorney and retired judge for the state of Delaware. He graduated from Salesianum School in Wilmington, Delaware in 1979 and was inducted into the school's hall of fame in 2021.

== Career ==
Bouchard began his legal career as a corporate litigator in the Wilmington, Delaware office of Skadden, Arps, Slate, Meagher & Flom in 1986.

In 1996, Bouchard founded the law firm of Lamb & Bouchard with now-former Vice Chancellor Stephen P. Lamb. The firm later rebranded as Bouchard, Margules & Friedlander with Bouchard as its managing partner. While in private practice, Bouchard also served as Chair of Delaware's Judicial Nominating Commission, "which screens judicial candidates for the governor."

In March 2014, Delaware governor Jack Markell nominated Bouchard to serve as Chancellor of the Delaware Court of Chancery. The Delaware Senate unanimously confirmed Bouchard's appointment on April 9, 2014, and Bouchard was sworn in as Chancellor on May 5, 2014.

In In re Trulia, Inc. Stockholder Litigation, Bouchard created a new standard to govern judicial approval of settlements in mergers and acquisitions lawsuits premised on alleged disclosure violations by corporate fiduciaries. Commentators interpreted the decision as a response to the profusion of "disclosure-only settlements," where a stockholder plaintiff who alleges that the merger proxy statement contains legally insufficient information about the transaction, then agrees to settle the litigation in exchange for supplemental disclosures. In Trulia, Bouchard noted that "[s]cholars have criticized disclosure settlements, arguing that non-material supplemental disclosures provide no benefit to stockholders and amount to little more than deal 'rents' or 'taxes,' while the liability releases that accompany settlements threaten the loss of potentially valuable claims related to the transaction in question." To solve this problem, Bouchard created a new standard under which the Court of Chancery will approve a disclosure-only settlement only if the supplemental disclosures obtained by the plaintiff are "plainly material," meaning they "must correct a material misrepresentation or omission." Analysts credited the Trulia decision with a significant reduction in the volume of stockholder challenges to mergers and acquisitions.

In December 2020, Bouchard announced that he would retire from the bench in April 2021. In October 2021, Bouchard joined the law firm of Paul, Weiss, Rifkind, Wharton & Garrison as a litigation partner in the firm's Wilmington, Delaware office.
