= Delaware Constitution of 1831 =

The Delaware Constitution of 1831 was the third governing document for the U.S. state of Delaware, replacing the Delaware Constitution of 1792, and was in effect from its adoption on December 2, 1831, until replaced on June 4, 1897, by the present state Constitution.

The Convention convened on November 8, 1831, and adjourned December 2, 1831. Members of the Delaware Constitutional Convention of 1831 included:

- Charles Polk Jr. (President)
- Thomas Adams
- John Caulk
- John M. Clayton
- Peter L. Cooper
- Thomas Deakyne
- Edward Dingle
- William Dunning
- John Elliott
- James Fisher
- Willard Hall
- Thomas W. Handy
- John Harlan
- Charles H. Haughey
- Hughitt Layton
- James C. Lynch
- James B. Macomb
- Joseph Maull
- Elias Naudain
- Wiliam Nicholls
- Samuel Ratcliff
- John Raymond
- George Read Jr.
- Henry F. Rodney
- James Rodgers
- William Seal
- Pressley Spruance Jr.
- William D. Waples

== See also ==
- Delaware Constitution of 1776
