= William B. Chandler III =

American judge

William Burton Chandler III is a former judge in the U.S. state of Delaware. He served as a resident judge on the Delaware Superior Court and as a Vice Chancellor and then Chancellor on the Delaware Court of Chancery.

Chandler received his undergraduate degree from the University of Delaware and his law degrees from the University of South Carolina School of Law and the Yale Law School. He was an associate with Morris, Nichols, Arsht & Tunnell and served as Legal Counsel to former Governor Pete duPont. Chandler taught commercial law, legislative process, and remedies for two years at the University of Alabama School of Law. He is a member of the American Law Institute and the Delaware Bar Association.

He served as Resident Judge of the Delaware Superior Court from 1985 to 1989. He was then appointed Vice Chancellor of the Delaware Court of Chancery in 1989 and Chancellor in 1997.

On June 17, 2011, he retired as Chancellor and became a partner of the law firm of Wilson Sonsini Goodrich & Rosati, P.C., and the managing partner of their new office in Georgetown, Delaware.

== Almanac ==
Public Offices
| Office | Type | Location | Began office | Ended office | notes |
|---|---|---|---|---|---|
| Resident Judge | Judiciary | Sussex County | 1985 | 1989 | Delaware Superior Court |
| Vice Chancellor | Judiciary | Sussex County | 1989 | 1997 | Delaware Court of Chancery |
| Chancellor | Judiciary | Sussex County | 1997 | 2011 | Delaware Court of Chancery |
