= Material adverse change =

Change reducing the value of a company

In the fields of mergers and acquisitions and corporate finance, a material adverse change (abbreviated MAC), material adverse event (MAE), or material adverse effect (also MAE) is a change in circumstances that significantly reduces the value of a company. A contract to acquire, invest in, or lend money to a company often contains a term that allows the acquirer, investor, or lender to cancel the transaction if a material adverse change occurs. Where an acquiring company uses its own shares as part of the consideration paid to acquire another company, or in a merger of two companies, the contract may provide that either party to the transaction can cancel it if a material adverse change significantly reduces the value of the other party.

Large transactions often require a long period of time between the signing of a contract and completion of the transaction. For example, time may be required to obtain approval of the transaction by government agencies, shareholders, labor unions, lenders, or others. Until the transaction is completed, the companies involved go on about their business and are subject to risks.

Contract terms that deal with material adverse changes are carefully negotiated by the parties and take into account the relevant circumstances of each party. Thus, the definition of material adverse changes is unique to each contract.

When a party to a contract claims that a material adverse change had occurred and refuses to complete the transaction on that ground, the other party may disagree and litigation may ensue. One notable example of this was the planned acquisition of SLM Corporation (formerly known as Sallie Mae) by a group including Bank of America and JPMorgan Chase. In the United States, much of this litigation occurs in the Delaware Court of Chancery because many large American companies are organized under Delaware law. According to a precedent of that court, the party that seeks to avoid completion of a transaction must prove that a material adverse change as defined by the parties' contract has occurred.
