= Florence Wood Hanby =

American politician

Member of the Delaware House of Representatives from the Brandywine Hundred district
- In office 1924–?

Personal details
- Born: April 18, 1870
- Died: February 22, 1963 (aged 92)
- Party: Republican

Florence Wood Hanby (April 18, 1870 – February 22, 1963) was a politician representing New Castle County, Delaware, United States.

Hanby was the first woman elected to the Delaware General Assembly, winning a seat in the Delaware House of Representatives in 1924.

== Career ==
Hanby was a Republican representing Brandywine Hundred in New Castle County.

Hanby was greeted cordially by her fellow assembly members. Upon arriving at the State House in January 1925, two floral bouquets were on her desk, to which she remarked, "it looks like a second wedding".

While in office, Hanby advocated to help victims of tuberculosis, and introduced the "Hope Farm Bill" to provide funding for an anti-tuberculosis hospital at Hope Farm, near Marshallton.
