= Myron T. Steele =

American judge

Chief Justice of the Delaware Supreme Court
- In office 2004–2014
- Appointed by: Ruth Ann Minner
- Preceded by: E. Norman Veasey
- Succeeded by: Leo E. Strine Jr.

Justice of the Delaware Supreme Court
- In office 2000–2014
- Appointed by: Tom Carper
- Preceded by: Maurice A. Hartnett III

Personal details
- Born: July 28, 1945 (age 81) Taunton, Massachusetts, U.S.
- Education: University of Virginia (BA, JD, LLM)
- Occupation: Judge, professor

Myron Thomas Steele (born July 28, 1945) is the former Chief Justice of the Delaware Supreme Court. First appointed to the court in 2000, Steele was elevated to the position of Chief Justice in 2004.

Steele received a J.D. from the University of Virginia School of Law in 1970, and an LL.M. from the same institution in 2005. He served as adjunct professor of law at University of Pennsylvania Law School from 2009 to 2013.
