= The Journal of Corporation Law =

- Discipline: Law review
- Language: English

Publication details
- History: 1974-present
- Publisher: University of Iowa College of Law (United States)
- Frequency: Quarterly

Standard abbreviations
- Bluebook: J. Corp. L.
- ISO 4: J. Corp. Law

Indexing
- ISSN: 0360-795X

Links
- Journal homepage

The Journal of Corporation Law (JCL), at the University of Iowa College of Law, is the nation's oldest student-published periodical specializing in corporate law. It published its first issue in 1975. Its current adviser is Sean Sullivan, who joined the College of Law faculty in 2017. The journal is routinely cited by scholars, practitioners, and courts, including the United States Supreme Court.

== Membership ==
Students apply for membership after completing their first year of legal study. The application consists of several short assignments meant to test an applicant's writing and editing ability. Each summer, the editorial board reviews these applications and invites 30 to 35 applicants to become student writers for the following academic year.

As student writers, JCL members write a Note discussing a relevant topic in corporate law. Excellent Notes are selected for publication. In addition, student writers are expected to complete 35 secondary hours per semester. This includes time spent at authority checks or on other journal-related projects that the editorial board assigns. Student writers improve their writing and editing skills.

Each spring, members of the outgoing editorial board select the next year's board members from the pool of student writers.

== Rankings ==
JCL is widely regarded as one of the premier journals in its field. In a 2005 ranking of corporate law journals by the ExpressO Law Review Submission Guide, JCL was the highest ranked journal in the field on the basis of total manuscripts submitted through Express0. According to the Washington and Lee Law Journal Rankings, JCL is the second highest ranked corporate law journal in the country, and the sixtieth highest ranked overall law journal.
