= Delaware General Assembly =

Legislative branch of the state government of Delaware

Type
- Type: Bicameral
- Houses: Senate; House of Representatives

Leadership
- Senate President: Kyle Evans Gay (D) since January 21, 2025
- Senate President pro tempore: David Sokola (D) since November 4, 2020
- House Speaker: Melissa Minor-Brown (D) since January 14, 2025

Structure
- Seats: 62
- Senate political groups: Democratic (15); Republican (6)
- House of Representatives political groups: Democratic (27); Republican (14)

Elections
- Last Senate election: November 5, 2024
- Last House of Representatives election: November 5, 2024
- Next Senate election: November 3, 2026
- Next House of Representatives election: November 3, 2026

Meeting place
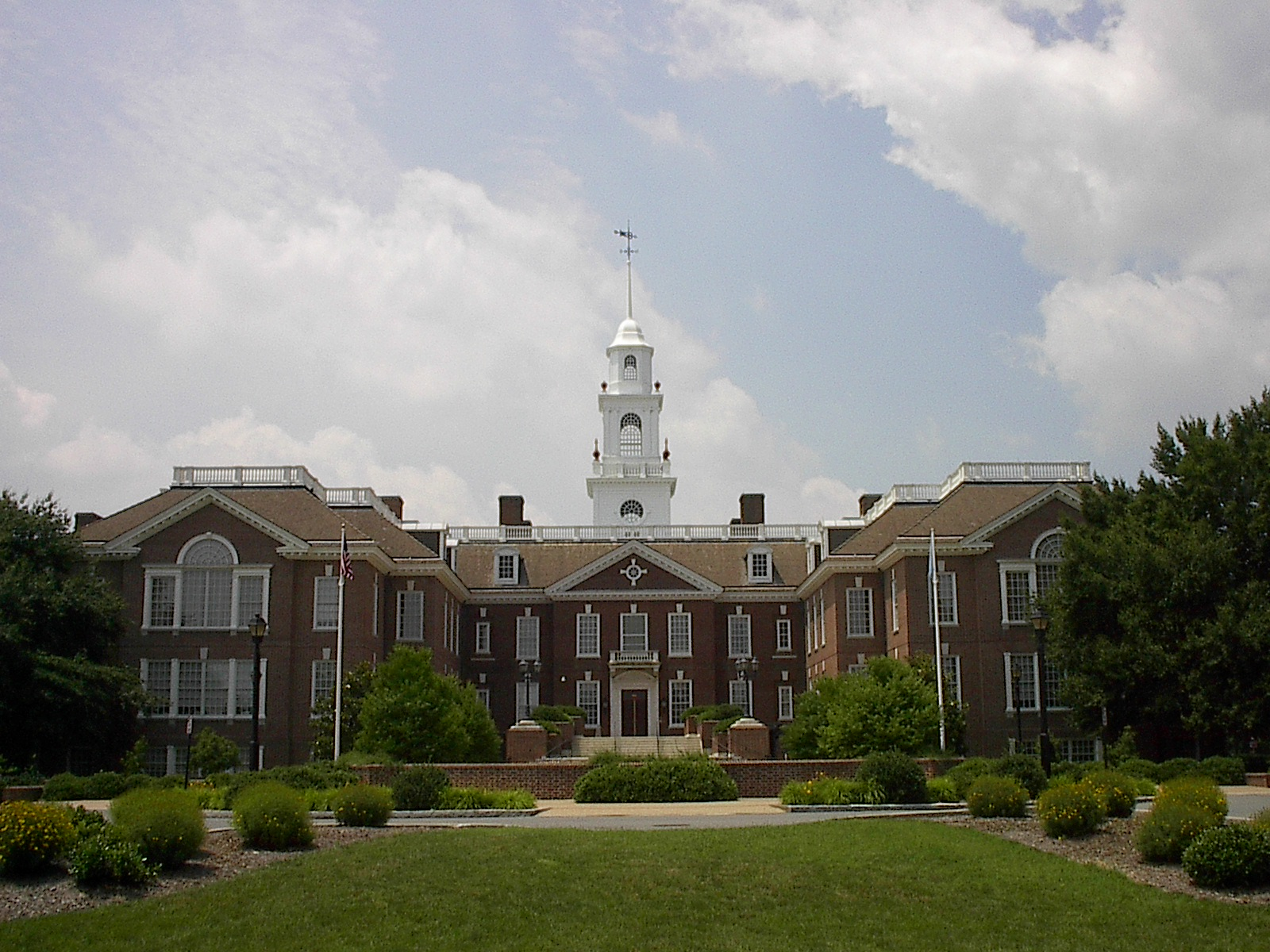
- Legislative Hall; Dover

Website
- Delaware General Assembly

Constitution
- Constitution of Delaware

The Delaware General Assembly is the legislature of the U.S. state of Delaware. It is a bicameral legislature composed of the Delaware Senate with 21 senators and the Delaware House of Representatives with 41 representatives. It meets at Legislative Hall in Dover, convening on the second Tuesday of January of odd-numbered years, with a second session of the same Assembly convening likewise in even-numbered years. Normally the sessions are required to adjourn by the last day of June of the same calendar year. However, the Governor can call a special session of the legislature at any time.

Members are elected from single-member districts, all apportioned to roughly equal populations after each decennial Census. Elections are held on the Tuesday after the first Monday in November and approximately half of the Senate is elected every two years to a four-year term, and the entire House of Representatives is elected every two years to a two-year term. Vacancies are filled through special elections. There are no term limits for either chamber.

With 62 seats, the Delaware General Assembly is the second-smallest bicameral state legislature in the United States – ahead of Alaska (60 seats) and behind Nevada (63).

== History ==
The Delaware General Assembly was one of the thirteen legislatures that participated in the American War of Independence. Created by the Delaware Constitution of 1776, its membership and responsibilities have been modified by the Delaware Constitution of 1792, the Delaware Constitution of 1831, the Delaware Constitution of 1897, and Supreme Court of the United States decision in Reynolds v. Sims in 1965.

Significant actions of the General Assembly include the calling of the constitutional convention which became the first to ratify the United States Constitution in 1787 (which led to Delaware's state nickname, "the First State"), and its rejection of secession from the Union on January 3, 1861, even though Delaware was a slave state. Also significant was its repeated refusal to legislate the end of slavery or voting rights for women, requiring federal law to enforce those changes.

Until 1898, the General Assembly was apportioned by county: a total of 30 members elected at-large by county with equal numbers from each of the three counties. After 1898, the total membership was increased to 52 and they were elected from districts, mostly corresponding to the geographical boundaries of hundreds within the counties. However, there was little recognition of disparities in population, except for the addition of two extra senators and five extra representatives elected from much more populous New Castle County. After the Supreme Court decision in Reynolds v. Sims in 1965, the General Assembly was forced to redistrict so that all members of both houses were elected from districts of equal population. By 1972, the total membership had increased to its present 62.

In 1924, Florence Wood Hanby became the first woman elected to the Delaware General Assembly, winning a seat in the Delaware House of Representatives.

It is the only legislature with the power to unilaterally amend its constitution without requiring a referendum or any other approval.

== See also ==
- List of Delaware General Assembly sessions
- Delaware Compensation Commission
