= Stephen P. Lamb =

American judge

Stephen P. Lamb is an American attorney and retired judge for the state of Delaware. He served as a vice chancellor on the Delaware Court of Chancery from 1997 to 2009.

After his twelve-year judicial term expired in 2009, Lamb returned to private practice with the firm Paul, Weiss, Rifkind, Wharton & Garrison where he is of counsel in the Corporate and Litigation Departments.

== Education ==
- J.D., Georgetown University Law Center, 1975
- B.A., University of Pennsylvania, 1971
