= Constitution of Delaware =

American state constitution

Constitution of the State of Delaware

Overview
- Jurisdiction: Delaware, United States
- Ratified: June 4, 1897
- Date effective: June 10, 1897; 128 years ago
- Chambers: Two (bicameral Delaware General Assembly)
- Executive: Governor of Delaware
- Judiciary: Judiciary of Delaware

History
- Amendments: 100+
- Signatories: 30 delegates

The Constitution of the State of Delaware of 1897 is the fourth and current governing document for Delaware state government and has been in effect since June 10 of that year.

== Executive ==
The Governor is the executive officer of the State, and is chosen by the qualified electors of the State, once every four years, at the general election. The term of the Governor is for four years, from the third Tuesday in January following the election. A person may be elected Governor only twice. The Governor must be thirty years old, a citizen and inhabitant of the United States for twelve years before the day of the election, and for the last six years of that time an inhabitant of Delaware.

The Governor is commander-in-chief of the state armed forces including the militia and, with the consent of the State Senate, appoint the Secretary of State to serve at the pleasure of the Governor.

Legislation approved by the General Assembly is submitted to the Governor for approval. In the event approval is not given, the legislation is returned to the General Assembly, reconsidered, and may become law without the Governor's approval only if three-fifths of each House of the General Assembly approve it.

Members of the Delaware Constitutional Convention of 1897. The Convention convened in December 1896 and adjourned June 4, 1897.

- John Biggs, President, Democrat from New Castle County
- Edward G. Bradford
- Martin B. Burris
- William A. Cannon
- Paris T. Carlisle Jr.
- Wilson T. Cavender
- David S. Clark
- J. Wilkins Cooch
- Ezekiel W. Cooper
- Robert W. Dasey
- Joshua A. Ellegood
- Charles B. Evans
- James B. Gilchrist
- Robert G. Harman
- Edward D. Hearne
- John W. Hering
- Andrew J. Horsey
- Andrew L. Johnson
- Woodburn Martin
- Elias N. Moore
- George H. Murray
- William P. Orr Jr.
- Nathan Pratt
- Charles F. Richards
- Lowder L. Sapp
- William Saulsbury
- William T. Smithers
- William C. Spruance, Republican from New Castle County
- Isaac K. Wright

== Amendment procedure ==
The Delaware Constitution is unusual in that the legislature has authority to amend it without a referendum. Article XVI, Section 1, of the Delaware Constitution provides that.

Any amendment or amendments to this Constitution may be proposed in the Senate or House of Representatives; and if the same shall be agreed to by two-thirds of all the members elected to each House, such proposed amendment or amendments shall be entered on their journals, with the yeas and nays taken thereon, and the Secretary of State shall cause such proposed amendment or amendments to be published three months before the next General Election in at least three newspapers in each county in which such newspapers shall be published; and if in the General Assembly next after the said election such proposed amendment or amendments shall upon yea and nay vote be agreed to by two-thirds of all the members elected to each House, the same shall thereupon become part of the Constitution.

The people are notified of the proposed amendment through the newspaper publications and may make their views known, and give effect to their desires, by voting for or against those legislators who are seeking to amend the constitution.

== History ==
Delaware held a convention in 1853 regarding slavery, producing a constitution that was rejected by voters.

== See also ==
- Delaware Constitution of 1776
- Delaware Constitution of 1792
- Delaware Constitution of 1831
