= The Delaware Journal of Corporate Law =

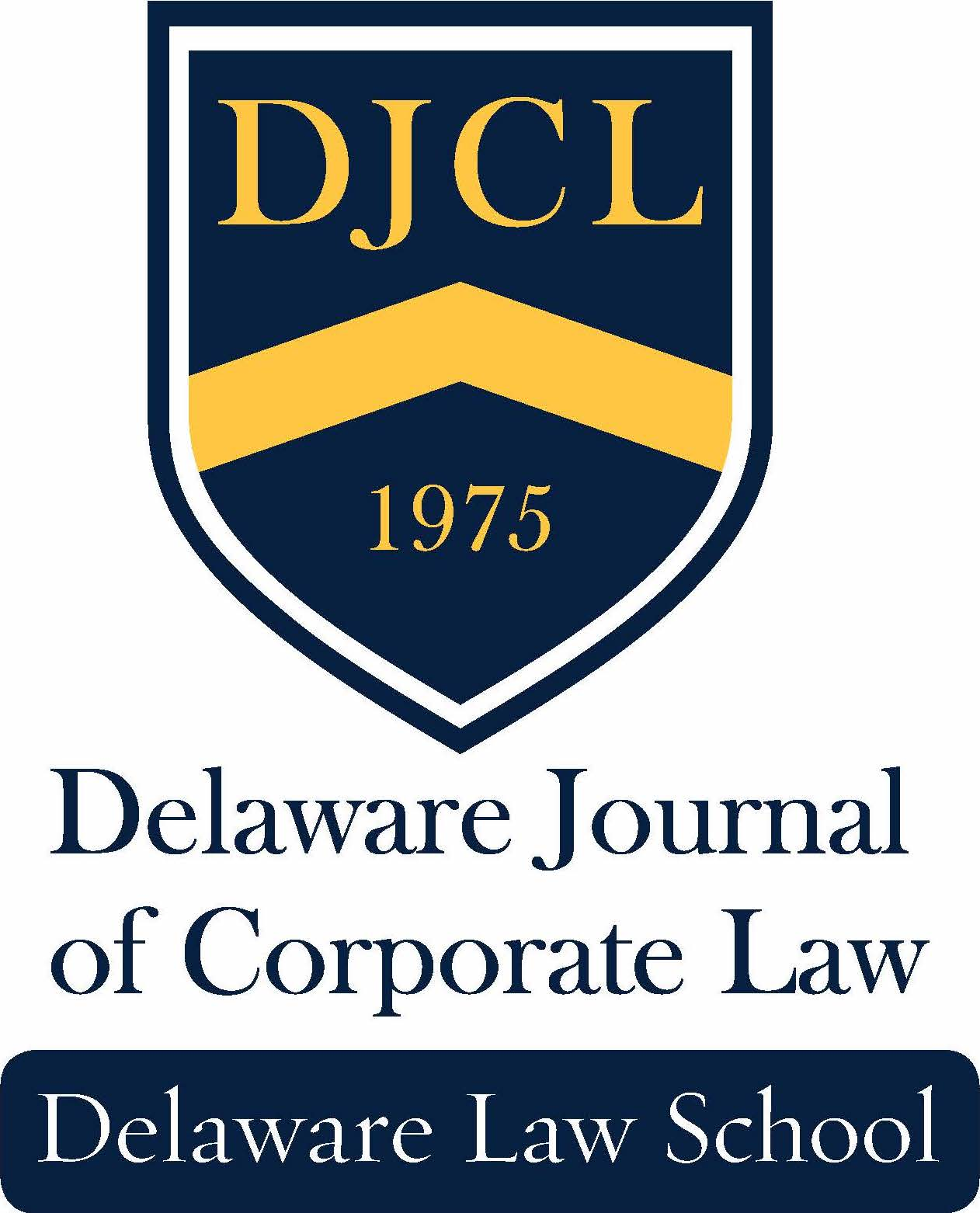
- Language: English
- Edited by: Kenneth P. DiFilippo

Publication details
- History: 1975-present
- Publisher: Widener University School of Law (United States)
- Frequency: Triannually
- Open access: Yes

Standard abbreviations
- Bluebook: Del. J. Corp. L.
- ISO 4: Del. J. Corp. Law

Indexing
- ISSN: 0364-9490
- LCCN: 76648400
- OCLC no.: 2696675

Links
- Journal homepage; Online access; Online archive

The Delaware Journal of Corporate Law is Widener University Delaware Law School's corporate law review. The Journal was established in 1975 and celebrated its 50th anniversary in 2025. The Journal publishes three issues per annual volume. In addition to scholarly articles, the Journal publishes opinions from the Delaware Court of Chancery that are not otherwise printed in a regional reporter. In 2022, the Journal began including student-authored case summaries to preface these opinions. It ranks among the top specialized legal journals in the United States based on the number of citations from federal and state courts. In 2008, the Journal ranked 10th out of 411 specialized journals based on citations in state and federal court opinions, and 1st among student-edited journals in the category "Corporate Law and Business Law."

== Francis G. Pileggi Distinguished Lecture in Law ==
The Journal hosts the annual Francis G. Pileggi Distinguished Lecture in Law. Held in Wilmington, Delaware, this lecture series is presented to the Delaware Bench and Bar and focuses on emerging corporate law issues. Notable past Pileggi lecturers include Ralph K. Winter, Jr. (1986-1987), Louis Loss (1987-1988), Joel Seligman (1997-1998), Lynn A. Stout (2001-2002), Robert B. Thompson (2003-2004), Melvin A. Eisenberg (2004-2005), Stephen Bainbridge (2005-2006), Mark J. Roe (2007-2008), Lisa Fairfax (2023-2024), Lawrence A. Cunningham (2024), and Arthur E. Wilmarth (2025).

== Membership selection ==
The Journal offers three methods for obtaining membership. First, those students whose academic performance has placed them in the top 5% of their respective class after completing first or second semester for regular division students or third semester for evening division students are invited to join. Second, students who have completed their first or second year in the regular division or second or third year in the evening division may obtain membership through the Summer or Winter Writing Competitions. These competitions take into consideration both the student's competition paper and grades. Finally, students, after completing their second year regular division or third year extended division, may submit a paper on a pre-approved topic as part of the Superior Authorship Competition, which takes place each summer. Participation in this competition is also subject to a minimum GPA requirement.

== See also ==
- Widener Law Review the law school's general interest publication.
