= Delaware Constitution of 1792 =

The Delaware Constitution of 1792 was the second governing document for Delaware state government. The Constitution was in effect from its adoption, on June 12, 1792, until it was replaced, on December 2, 1831, by a new Constitution.

The Constitution is known for establishing the Delaware Court of Chancery, the world preeminent business court.

Members of the Delaware Constitutional Convention of 1792. The Convention convened in 1792 and adjourned June 12, 1792.

- Thomas Montgomery, President
- Robert Armstrong
- Andrew Barratt
- Richard Bassett
- John W. Batson
- Isaac Beauchamp
- John M. Clayton
- Isaac Cooper
- Robert Coram
- John Dickinson
- Benjamin Dill
- Manlove Emerson
- Robert Haughey
- Kensey Johns
- William Johnson
- George Mitchell
- Henry Molleston
- George Monro
- James Morris
- Daniel Polk
- Nicholas Ridgely
- Edward Roche
- Rhoads Shankland
- Thomas White

== See also ==
- Delaware Constitution of 1776
- Delaware Constitution of 1831
- Delaware Constitution of 1897, current
