= Delaware Constitution of 1776 =

First governing document for the state of Delaware

The Delaware Constitution of 1776 was the first governing document for Delaware state government and was in effect from its adoption in September 1776 until its replacement by the 1792 constitution.

== Background ==
On June 15, 1776, at the urging of Patriot leader Thomas McKean, the General Assembly "suspended government under the Crown", effectively ending the Proprietary government in the Lower Counties, as Delaware was then known. After the passage of the United States Declaration of Independence, the General Assembly met in July 1776 and enacted legislation calling for the August 1776 election of a State Constitutional Convention. There were to be ten members from each county.

The convention met in New Castle on August 27, 1776. George Read was elected its President and Thomas McKean was a major contributor to the content of the finished product. The writing was quickly finished and put into effect upon its adoption September 20, 1776, by the convention, less than a month later. It was never submitted for popular approval and was the first state constitution written by a convention elected for that purpose subsequent to the Declaration of Independence. The convention dissolved itself after it had drafted the constitution, unlike previous states whose convention became the legislature.

The members of the convention were generally moderates or conservatives who sought to keep the government as close to the existing one as possible. The major change was the replacement of the Proprietary Governor with an executive privy council, chaired by a president. A second house of the legislature was created as well. Both measures were meant to restrict the perceived arbitrary exercise of executive authority.

The first independent General Assembly was elected and convened in October 1776, and elected the Privy Council and its President in January 1777.

== Provisions ==
=== Name ===
The name was to be The Delaware State. It replaced the old awkward, The Counties of New Castle, Kent and Sussex upon Delaware, and its more common informal abbreviation, the Lower Counties of Delaware.

=== Legislature ===
The Legislature was called the General Assembly of Delaware and was to meet at least once every year. Only freeholders were eligible for election.

The upper house of the General Assembly was called The Legislative Council, and consisted of nine persons, three persons from each county, popularly elected every third year by the freeholders of the county. They served for a term of three years, except that two of the first persons chosen from each county were chosen for shorter terms to establish the cycle. As a result, there was to be one term expiring each year in each county.

The lower house of the General Assembly was called the House of Assembly, and consisted of twenty-one persons, seven persons from each county, popularly elected each year by the freeholders of the county. They served for a term of one year.

Each House was given rights to organize itself by choosing its Speaker and officers, judging qualifications and elections of its members, establishing its own procedures and rules for filling vacancies. Anticipating what was to come in the U.S. Constitution of 1787, all money bills were to originate only in the House of Assembly.

Delegates to the Congress of the Confederation were chosen annually by joint ballot of both Houses of the General Assembly, meaning a majority of thirty persons would win the election.

=== Executive ===
The executive authority of the state was vested in a President or Chief Magistrate. The President was chosen by joint ballot of both Houses of the General Assembly. In the event of a tie, The Legislative Council would have an additional vote and break the tie. The President was to have a term of three years and no longer, and was to be eligible for reelection only after three more years had passed from when he was last in office.

The President was to be paid and had authority, with the concurrence of the Privy Council, to lay embargoes, grant pardons in certain circumstances, and exercise other unspecified executive powers of government. He was also Commander in Chief of the armed forces of the state and had the authority to call the General Assembly into session, but could not prorogue, adjourn or dissolve it. In the event of a vacancy, the Speaker of the House of Assembly was to assume the powers of the President until the General Assembly could select a new person.

A four-member Privy Council shared the executive authority with the President. The President always acted with their advice and consent. The Privy Council was elected by the General Assembly, two members from The Legislative Council, and two members from the House of Assembly. Officers of the Continental Army were ineligible for election and should a member of the General Assembly be elected to the Privy Council, they were required to give up their seat in the legislature. Each year each House of the General Assembly filled vacancies, replacing at least one of the Privy Counsellors they had selected. A Privy Counsellor was to serve no more than three years at a time, and was to be eligible for reelection only after three more years had passed from when he was last in office.

=== Judiciary ===
The President and General Assembly, by joint ballot elected the judges listed below. They were to hold no other office, except the militia, be paid, and allowed to serve "during good behavior." In the event of a deadlock in the selection vote, the President was to have an additional vote.

- Three Justices of the Supreme Court, one being named Chief Justice.
- One Judge of Admiralty.
- Four Justices of the Courts of Common Pleas & Orphan Courts for each county, one in each county being named Chief Justice.

The House of Assembly nominated twenty-four persons from each county as Justice of the Peace, with the President and Privy Council appointing twelve of these for a term of seven years. The members of The Legislative Council and Privy Council were also Justices of the Peace for the whole state. The Justices of the Courts of Common Pleas were Conservators of the Peace in their respective counties.

The Clerk of the Supreme Court were appointed by the Chief Justice of the Supreme Court and the three county Recorder of Deeds were appointed by the Justices of the Courts of Common Pleas, all for a term of five years.

A Court of Appeals served as a final appeal from decisions of the Supreme Court. It consisted of the President and three persons appointed by The Legislative Council and three persons appointed by the House of Assembly. The Secretary of State was clerk of this Court.

=== Constitutional offices ===
The President and Privy Council appointed the officers listed below for a term of five years:

- Secretary of State
- Attorney General
- Register of Wills for each county.
- Register in Chancery for each county.
- Clerk of the Peace for each county.
- Clerk of the Court of Common Pleas and Orphan Courts for each county.

A Sheriff and Coroner were selected annually for each county by the President and Privy Council. The Sheriff was not permitted to serve more than three years without spending three years out of office.

The President and Privy Council appointed persons to fill vacancies in all these offices until a new election could be held.

Provision was made for the impeachment and prosecution of the President and other officials by the House of Assembly before The Legislative Council.

All officials were required to take an oath of allegiance to Delaware and declare their faith in God, Jesus Christ, the Holy Ghost, and acknowledge the Holy Bible to be given by divine inspiration.

=== Other provisions ===
Provision was made for continuance of all laws in effect in May 1776 unless altered, temporary or otherwise removed.

Provision was made for the continuance of the English Common Law.

Provision was made to prohibit the entry of anyone from Africa or elsewhere for the purpose of holding them in slavery.

The establishment of any denomination was prohibited and no active clergymen of any denomination were allowed to hold any office, including membership in the General Assembly.

The Constitution could be amended only by five/sevenths of the House of Assembly and seven Members of The Legislative Council.

=== Elections and terms of office ===
The first election was to be held October 21, 1776, at the various Court Houses at which time Sheriffs and Coroners and members of the General Assembly were to be elected. The General Assembly was to meet October 28, 1776, and continue in office until October 1, 1777. Subsequent elections were to take place annually on the first of October, with the General Assembly meeting the twentieth of October.

No armed persons or militia were allowed within one mile of polling places within a day of elections.

== See also ==
- Delaware Constitution of 1792
- Delaware Constitution of 1831
- Delaware Constitution of 1897, current
