= RKO Pictures =

American film and distribution company

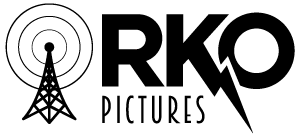
- Company logo as of 2026
- Formerly: RKO Productions, Inc. (1929–30); RKO Radio Pictures, Inc. (1930–57); RKO Pictures Inc. (1978–89); RKO/Pavilion (1989–91); RKO Pictures LLC. (1991–present)
- Type: Subsidiary
- Industry: Film
- Predecessors: Keith-Albee-Orpheum Corporation; Film Booking Offices of America
- Founded: January 25, 1929; 97 years ago (original; as RKO Productions, Inc.); 1978; 48 years ago (relaunch; as RKO Pictures, Inc.)
- Founder: David Sarnoff
- Defunct: 1958; 68 years ago (original)
- Headquarters: LA Office: 11301 West Olympic Blvd., Suite 510, Los Angeles, CA 90064; NY Office: 750 Lexington Ave., Suite 2200, New York, NY 10022
- Key people: Sophia Dilley (co-president); Mary Beth O'Connor (co-president)
- Owner: Concord Originals (BMG)
- Parent: Radio-Keith-Orpheum Corp. (1929–50); RKO Pictures Corp. (1950–55); RKO Teleradio Pictures (1955–58); RKO General (1978–87); RKO/Six Flags Entertainment Inc. (1987–89); Concord Originals (2025–present)
- Divisions: RKO Stage Productions; RKO Radio
- Website: www.rko.com

RKO Pictures, commonly known as simply RKO, is an American film, television and stage production company owned by Concord Originals, a division of BMG. In its original incarnation, as RKO Radio Pictures, Inc., it was one of the "Big Five" film studios of Hollywood's Golden Age. The business was formed after the Keith-Albee-Orpheum theater chain and Joseph P. Kennedy's Film Booking Offices of America studio were brought together under the control of the Radio Corporation of America (RCA) in October 1928. RCA executive David Sarnoff engineered the merger to create a market for the company's sound-on-film technology, RCA Photophone, and in early 1929 production began under the RKO name (an initialism of Radio-Keith-Orpheum). Two years later, another Kennedy concern, the Pathé studio, was folded into the operation. By the mid-1940s, RKO was controlled by investor Floyd Odlum.

RKO has long been renowned for its cycle of musicals starring Fred Astaire and Ginger Rogers in the mid- to late 1930s. Actors Katharine Hepburn and, later, Robert Mitchum had their first major successes at the studio. Cary Grant was a mainstay for years, with credits including touchstones of the screwball comedy genre with which RKO was identified. The work of producer Val Lewton's low-budget horror unit and RKO's many ventures into the field now known as film noir have been acclaimed, largely after the fact, by film critics and historians. The studio produced two of the most famous films in motion picture history: King Kong and producer/director/star Orson Welles' Citizen Kane. RKO was also responsible for notable coproductions such as It's a Wonderful Life and Notorious, and it distributed many celebrated films by animation pioneer Walt Disney and leading independent producer Samuel Goldwyn. Though it often could not compete financially for top star and director contracts, RKO's below-the-line personnel were among the finest, including composer Max Steiner, cinematographers Nicholas Musuraca and Gregg Toland, and designer Van Nest Polglase.

Maverick industrialist Howard Hughes took over RKO in 1948. After years of disarray and decline under his control, the studio was acquired by the General Tire and Rubber Company in 1955. It soon broke new business ground as the first major studio to sell the bulk of its film library's TV rights. The original RKO Pictures ceased production in 1957 and was effectively dissolved two years later. In 1978, broadcaster RKO General, the corporate heir, launched a production subsidiary, RKO Pictures Inc., which revived the film production brand with its first theatrical releases three years later. In 1989, this business, with its remaining assets, including the studio trademarks and the remake rights to many classic RKO films, was sold to new owners. It was re-established as the production company RKO Pictures LLC., which operated independently for 35 years until it was acquired by Concord Originals in 2025.

== Origin ==
In October 1927, Warner Bros. released The Jazz Singer, the first feature-length talking picture. Its success prompted Hollywood to convert from silent to sound film production en masse. The Radio Corporation of America (RCA) controlled an advanced optical sound-on-film system, Photophone, recently developed by General Electric, RCA's parent company. Its path to joining the anticipated boom in sound movies had a major hurdle: Warner Bros. and Fox, Hollywood's other vanguard sound studio, were already financially and technologically aligned with ERPI, a subsidiary of AT&T's Western Electric division. The industry's two largest companies, Paramount and Loew's/MGM, along with First National Pictures—third of the silent era "Big Three" major studios, but by then in marked decline—and Universal Pictures, were poised to contract with ERPI and its Vitaphone and Movietone systems for sound conversion as well.

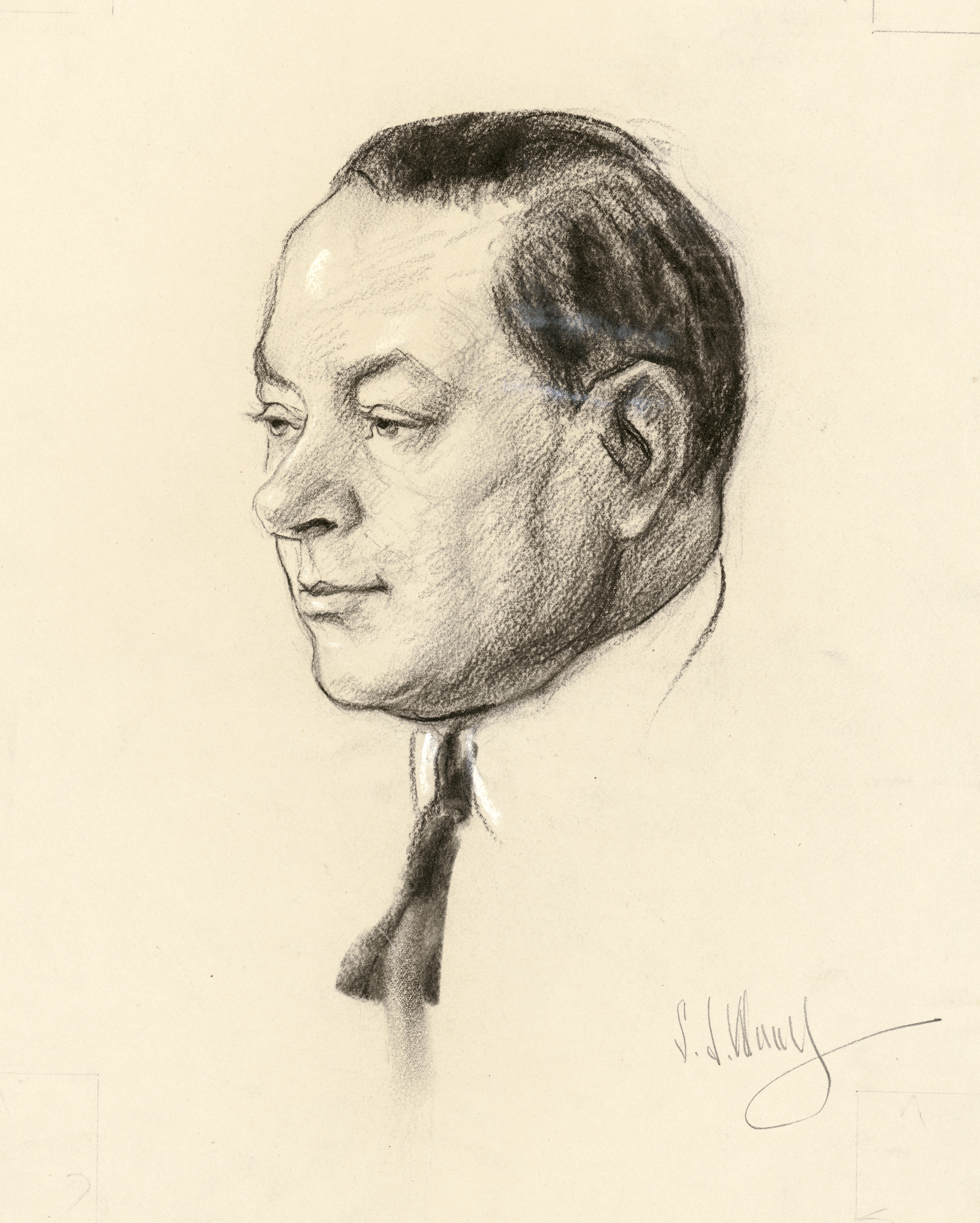
David Sarnoff (1929), by Samuel Johnson Woolf, National Portrait Gallery

Seeking a customer for Photophone, then general manager of RCA David Sarnoff approached financier Joseph P. Kennedy in late 1927 about using the system for his Film Booking Offices of America (FBO). A Kennedy-led investment group had acquired the modest-sized, low-budget-focused studio the previous year, and he had turned it into a steady profit maker. Negotiations resulted in RCA acquiring a substantial interest in FBO; Sarnoff had apparently already conceived of a plan for the studio to attain a central position in the film industry, maximizing Photophone revenue. Next was securing a string of exhibition venues like those the leading Hollywood production companies owned. Kennedy began investigating the possibility of such a purchase.

At that same time, the allied Keith-Albee and Orpheum theater circuits, built around the then fading medium of live vaudeville, were pursuing a transition into the movie business. In 1926 the exhibitors had acquired a 50 percent stake in the holding company of Producers Distributing Corporation (PDC), a smaller studio than FBO but more prestigious. Famed director Cecil B. DeMille—PDC studio chief and owner of its Culver City production facility—had been draining the company's resources for his well-appointed productions, and it had been finding little success in getting its films into first-run theaters, which were largely tied up by the majors. In early 1927, despite months of DeMille's strenuous objections, an agreement was reached to merge PDC into Pathé, a lower-level studio known for its newsreel and churn out of cheap shorts. Investment banker Elisha Walker, whose Blair & Co. firm owned the controlling interest in Pathé, brought on Keith-Albee general manager John J. Murdock as studio president. In January 1928, a less tense merger, engineered by Murdock, was finalized, establishing the Keith-Albee-Orpheum (KAO) theater chain. With Pathé's finances in a ditch, Murdock, at Walker's prodding, turned to Kennedy for help in reorganizing the studio and consolidating it with PDC. The two men found that they had mutual interests, in particular, removing Edward Albee, the "Czar of Vaudeville" and Murdock's nominal boss, from the picture. Sarnoff's vision of a new big-league studio was coming into focus—and both Kennedy and Walker had similar notions.^{[a]}

Radio-Keith-Orpheum logo, 1929

Assisted by Murdock and with Blair & Co.'s backing, Kennedy quickly maneuvered to interlock KAO and FBO, selling the exhibitor a substantial stake in his studio while buying up copious amounts of KAO stock. Within months, he had installed himself as chairman of the theater chain's new board of directors. When Albee, still KAO president, visited his office, Kennedy reportedly asked, "Didn't you know, Ed? You're washed up. You're through." DeMille departed with a large payout in April and later in the year signed a three-picture deal with MGM. Sarnoff and Kennedy began talks about setting up a holding company funded by RCA cash and KAO securities, but plans stalled as Sarnoff grew frustrated with Kennedy's reluctance to pay for the Photophone work proceeding, if slowly, at FBO and Pathé. An attempt by Kennedy to reorganize yet another studio that had turned to him for help, now ERPI-aligned First National, further strained his relationship with Sarnoff and raised the threat that Photophone would be locked out of the industry entirely. Though Kennedy's deal with First National collapsed within weeks, the RCA executive saw that it was time to make his move.

In September, while Kennedy was traveling in Europe, Sarnoff began negotiations with Walker, whose firm was now heavily invested in KAO, to merge the exhibition circuit with Film Booking Offices under RCA control. Soon after Kennedy's return at the end of the month, he closed the deal, arranging to sell off his FBO and KAO shares, options, and convertibles at enormous profit. On October 23, 1928, RCA announced the creation of the Radio-Keith-Orpheum Corp. holding company, with Sarnoff as board chairman. The new administration made clear that Kennedy's services were no longer needed and he stepped down from his board and executive positions in the merged businesses, leaving him with co-ownership and management of Pathé and the PDC assets that it had absorbed.^{[b]} RCA owned the governing stock interest in RKO, 22 percent (in the early 1930s, its stake rose as high as 60 percent). On January 25, 1929, the new company's production arm, presided over by former FBO vice-president Joseph I. Schnitzer, was unveiled as RKO Productions Inc. A week later, it filed for the trademark "Radio Pictures".

== History ==
=== Early years ===
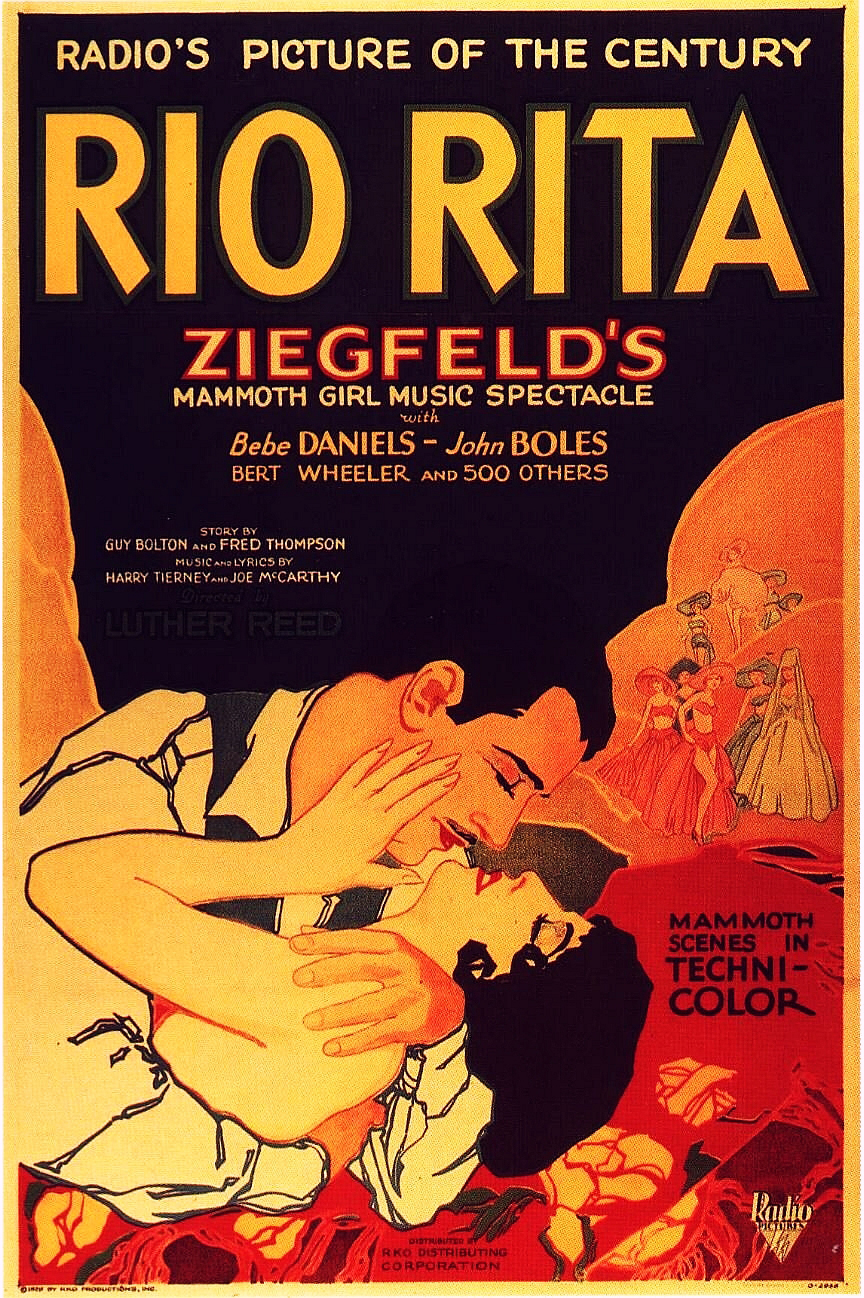
Rio Rita (1929), first smash hit for RKO (then releasing films under the "Radio Pictures" banner)

While the main FBO studio in Hollywood was refitted for sound, production of shorts began in New York at the RKO Gramercy studio Sarnoff had just opened. RCA's radio network, NBC, began broadcasting a weekly variety show, The RKO Hour, that became a prime promotional vehicle for the studio's films. The first two features released by the new company were musicals: The melodramatic Syncopation, which actually completed shooting before FBO was reincorporated as RKO, premiered on March 29, 1929. The comedic Street Girl debuted July 30. This was billed as RKO's first "official" production and its first to be shot in Hollywood.^{[c]} As with many early RKO films, the producer was studio chief William LeBaron, who had held the same position at FBO. A few nonsinging pictures followed, but RKO's first major hit was again a musical. The studio spent heavily on the lavish Rio Rita, including a number of Technicolor sequences. Opening in September to rave reviews, it was named one of the ten best pictures of the year by Film Daily. Cinema historian Richard Barrios credits it with initiating the "first age of the filmed Broadway musical". By the end of the year, RKO was making use of an additional production facility—five hundred acres had been acquired near Encino in the San Fernando Valley as a movie ranch for exteriors and large-scale standing sets.

With RKO Productions' films handled by sibling subsidiary RKO Distributing Corp., the studio released a limited slate of twelve features in its first year; in 1930, the figure more than doubled to twenty-nine. That July, RKO Productions Inc. was renamed RKO Radio Pictures Inc. RKO Pictures Ltd. was set up to handle British distribution. Encouraged by Rio Rita's success, RKO produced several costly musicals incorporating Technicolor sequences, among them Dixiana and Hit the Deck, both scripted and directed, like Rio Rita, by Luther Reed. Following the example of the other major studios, RKO had planned to create its own musical revue, Radio Revels. Promoted as the studio's most extravagant production to date, it was to be photographed entirely in Technicolor. The project was abandoned, as the public's taste for musicals temporarily subsided. From more than sixty Hollywood musicals in 1929 and over eighty the following year, the number dropped to eleven in 1931.

Rio Rita star Bebe Daniels, who had joined the new studio as its top female name after the final months of her contract at Paramount were bought out, fell victim to the shifting market. Her big musical follow-up, Dixiana, had been a big money loser, and in January 1931 her contract was sold to Warner Bros. RKO, meanwhile, was in a contractual bind that it could not get out of: it was committed to producing two more features with Technicolor's system, even as audiences had come to associate color with the momentarily out-of-favor musical genre. Fulfilling its obligations, RKO produced two all-Technicolor pictures, The Runaround and Fanny Foley Herself (both 1931), containing no musical sequences. Neither was a success.

Despite these issues—and the foundering U.S. economy—RKO had gone on a spending spree, buying up theater after theater to add to its exhibition chain. In October 1930, the company purchased a 50 percent stake in the New York Van Beuren studio, which specialized in cartoons and live shorts. Looking to get out of the film business, Kennedy arranged for RKO to purchase Pathé, in a deal that protected his associates' bond investments while it crushed many small stockholders who had bought in at artificially high prices. (Indeed, Kennedy, who had previously sold all of his Pathé holdings, started buying back bonds, which he turned around for substantial gains.) The deal was secured on January 29, 1931, and the studio, with its contract players, well-regarded newsreel operation, and DeMille's old Culver City studio and backlot, became the semiautonomous RKO Pathé Pictures Inc. The acquisition, though a defensible investment in the long term for Pathé's physical facilities, was yet another major expense borne by the fledgling RKO, particularly as the reliably avaricious Kennedy had masked Pathé's considerable financial woes, just as he had with FBO and KAO.

There was an undeniable plus side to the merger: when Pathé's Constance Bennett, Ann Harding, and Helen Twelvetrees joined the Radio family in early 1931, they were bigger box office draws than anyone on the RKO roster. The studio's production schedule surpassed forty features a year, released under the names "Radio Pictures" and, until late 1932, "RKO Pathé". Cimarron (1931) became the only RKO production to win the Academy Award for Best Picture; it cost a profligate $1.4 million, however, and lost nearly half that on its first release.^{[d]} Cimmaron's female principal, Irene Dunne, was the studio's one major homegrown star of this early pre-Code era; having made her screen debut as the lead in the 1930 musical Leathernecking, she would headline at the studio for the entire decade, under contracts that gave her an unusual amount of power. Other significant actors of the period included Joel McCrea, Ricardo Cortez, Dolores del Río, and Mary Astor. Richard Dix, Oscar-nominated for his performance in Cimarron, would serve as RKO's standby B-movie leading man until the early 1940s, while Tom Keene was top-billed in twelve low-budget Westerns between 1931 and 1933. The comedy team of Bert Wheeler and Robert Woolsey, often wrangling over ingenue Dorothy Lee, was a bankable constant for almost a decade.

=== Success under Selznick ===
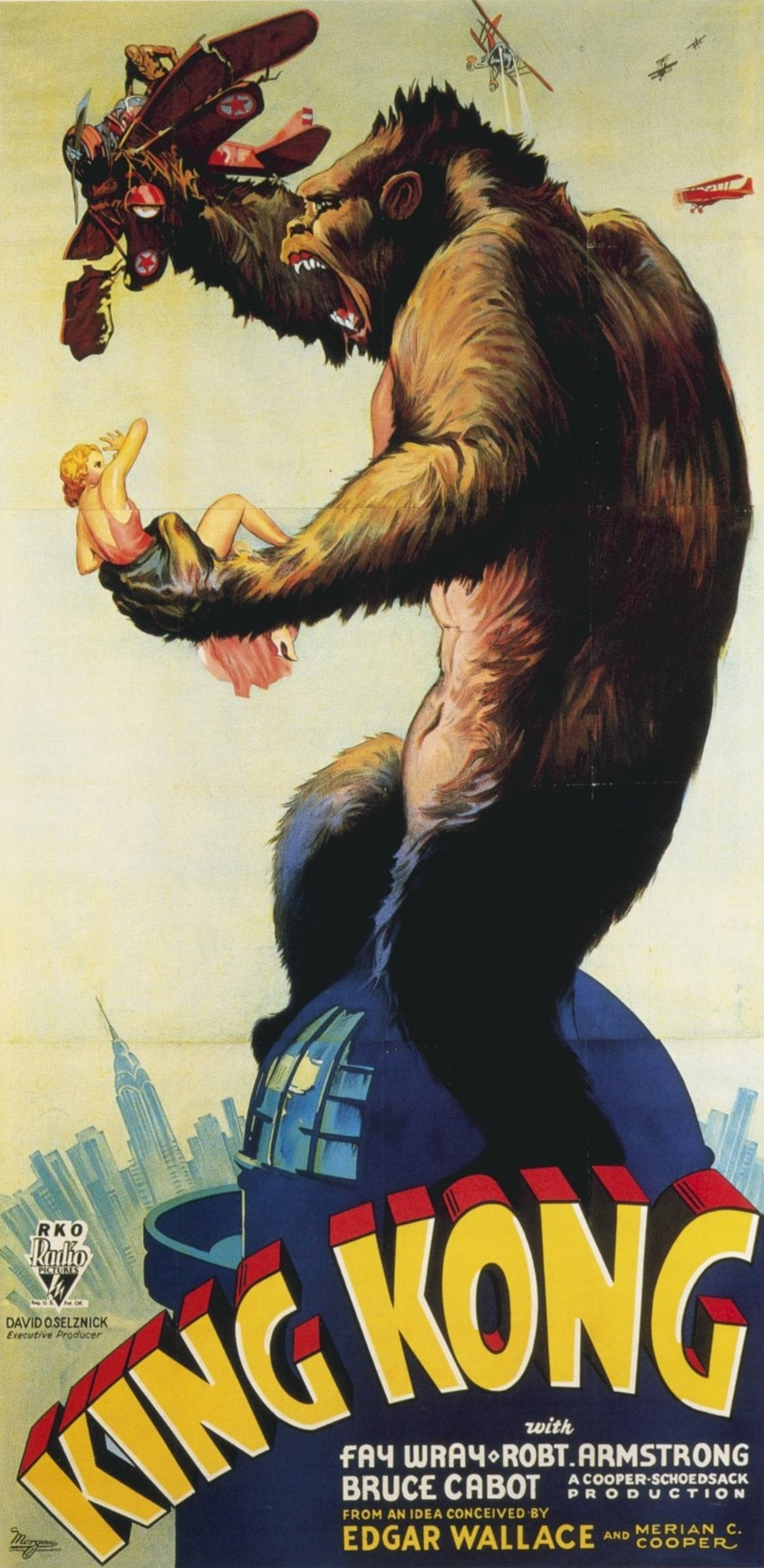
King Kong (1933), one of Hollywood's great spectacles

Exceptions like Cimarron and Rio Rita aside, RKO's product was largely regarded as mediocre, so in October 1931 Sarnoff hired twenty-nine-year-old David O. Selznick to replace LeBaron as production chief. In addition to implementing rigorous cost-control measures, Selznick championed the unit production system, which gave the producers of individual movies much greater independence than they had under the prevailing central producer system. "Under the factory system of production you rob the director of his individualism", said Selznick, "and this being a creative industry that is harmful to the quality of the product made." Instituting unit production, he predicted, would also result in cost savings of 30–40 percent. To make films under the new system, Selznick recruited prize behind-the-camera personnel, such as director George Cukor and producer/director Merian C. Cooper, and gave producer Pandro S. Berman, aged twenty-six, increasingly important projects. Selznick discovered and signed a young actress who would quickly become one of the studio's big stars, Katharine Hepburn. John Barrymore was also enlisted for a few memorable performances.

In November 1931, just as Selznick was assuming his new post, the separate Pathé distribution network was folded into RKO's. After less than a year of largely independent operation out of Culver City, the Pathé feature film division soon followed (due to exhibition contracts, features from the division continued to come out under the combined brand until the following November). RKO Pathé was now effectively the studio's newsreel-and-shorts subsidiary. In January 1932, Variety named Constance Bennett as one of the industry's top six female "money stars". From September, the start of the industry's exhibition season, print advertising for the company's features displayed the revised name "RKO Radio Pictures".^{[e]} The New York City–based corporate headquarters moved into the new RKO Building, an Art Deco skyscraper that was one of the first Rockefeller Center structures to open. Hollywood on the Air, an RKO-produced program for NBC radio that promoted films from multiple studios, sparked independent exhibitors' ire at the free access to cinema stars it gave listeners—especially in the middle of prime moviegoing Friday night. Toward the end of 1932, all of the Hollywood studios except for RKO seemingly bowed to the theater owners and prohibited radio appearances by their contract actors. The ban soon crumbled.

Selznick spent a mere fifteen months as RKO production chief, resigning over a dispute with new corporate president Merlin Aylesworth concerning creative control. One of his last acts at RKO was to approve a screen test for a thirty-three-year-old, balding Broadway song-and-dance man named Fred Astaire. In a memo, Selznick wrote, "I feel, in spite of his enormous ears and bad chin line, that his charm is ... tremendous". Selznick's tenure was widely considered masterful: In 1931, before he arrived, the studio had produced forty-two features for $16 million in total budgets. In 1932, under Selznick, forty-one features were made for $10.2 million, with clear improvement in quality and popularity. He backed several major successes, including A Bill of Divorcement (1932), with Cukor directing Hepburn's debut, and the monumental King Kong (1933)—largely Merian Cooper's brainchild, brought to life by the astonishing special effects work of Willis O'Brien. Still, the shaky finances and excesses that marked the company's pre-Selznick days had not left RKO in shape to withstand the Depression. Most of the other major studios were in similar straits. In January 1933, both RKO and Paramount were forced into receivership, from which the latter would emerge in mid-1935; RKO would not until 1940.

=== Cooper at the helm ===
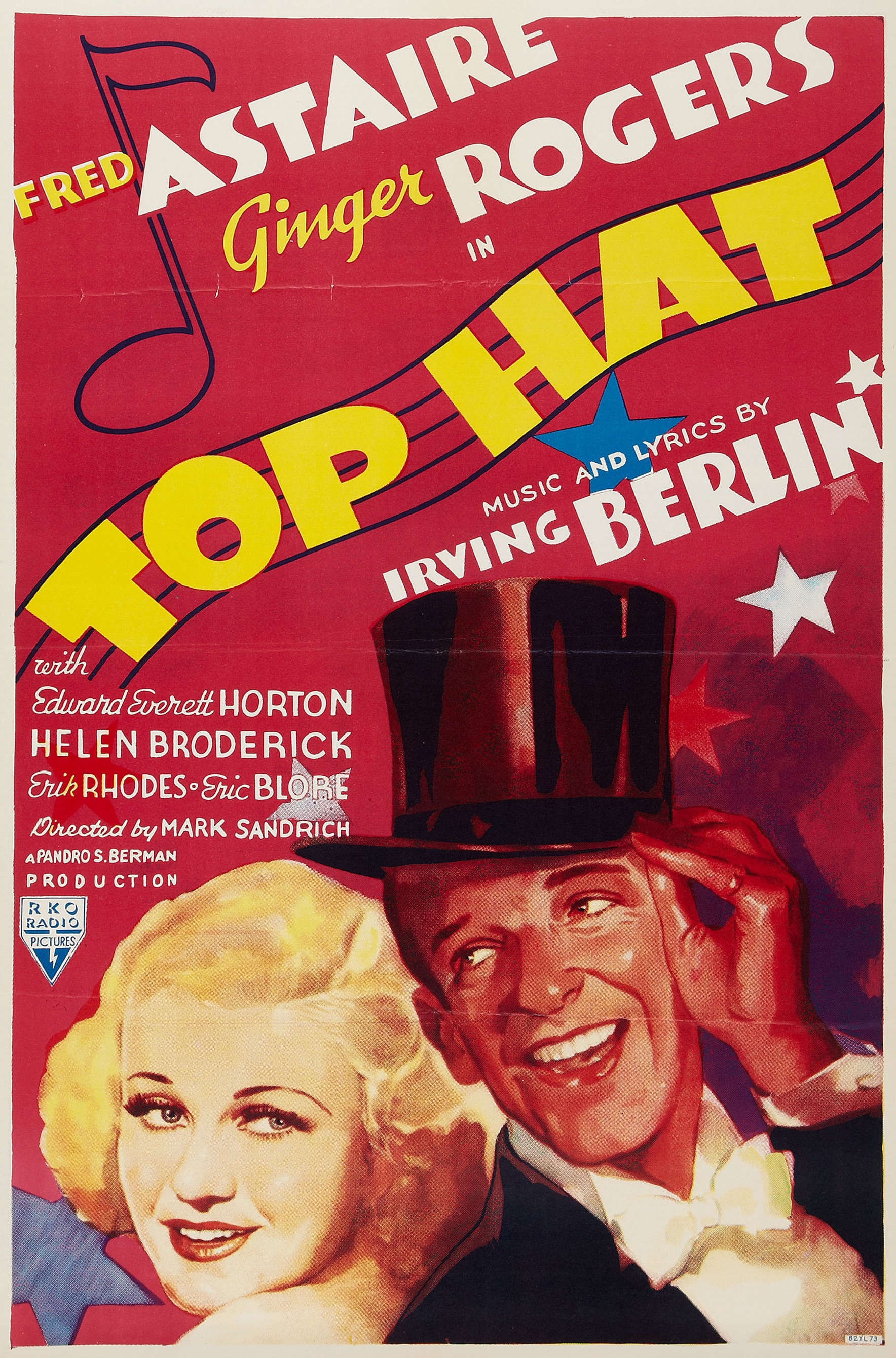
Fred Astaire and Ginger Rogers made the annual list of top ten box office stars from 1935 to 1937. Top Hat (1935) was the third of the eight RKO films featuring the duo as co-leads.

Cooper took over as production head after Selznick's departure and oversaw two hits starring Hepburn: Morning Glory (1933), for which she won her first Oscar, and Little Women (1933), director Cukor's second collaboration with the actress. Among the studio's in-house productions, the latter was the biggest box-office success of the decade. Cooper sought to more tightly align costs and prospective grosses, impacting the budgets for "programmers" such as the Wheeler and Woolsey comedies: under Selznick, Hold 'Em Jail and Girl Crazy (both 1932) had cost an average of $470,000; under Cooper, Diplomaniacs (1933) was shot for just $242,000. Ginger Rogers had already made several minor films for RKO when Cooper signed her to a seven-year contract and cast her in the big-budget musical Flying Down to Rio (1933). Rogers was paired with Fred Astaire, making his second film. Billed fourth and fifth respectively, the picture turned them into stars. Hermes Pan, assistant to the film's dance director, became one of Hollywood's leading choreographers through his subsequent work with Astaire.

Along with Columbia Pictures, RKO became one of the primary homes of the screwball comedy. As film historian James Harvey describes, compared to their richer competition, the two studios were "more receptive to experiment, more tolerant of chaos on the set. It was at these two lesser 'majors' ... that nearly all the preeminent screwball directors did their important films—[Howard] Hawks and [Gregory] La Cava and [Leo] McCarey and [George] Stevens." The relatively unheralded William A. Seiter directed the studio's first significant contribution to the genre, The Richest Girl in the World (1934). The drama Of Human Bondage (1934), directed by John Cromwell, was Bette Davis' first great success. Stevens' Alice Adams and director John Ford's The Informer were each nominated for the 1935 Best Picture Oscar—the Best Director statuette won by Ford was the only one ever given for an RKO production. The Informer's star, Victor McLaglen, also took home an Academy Award; he would appear in a dozen movies for the studio over two decades. From soon after its debut in early 1935 until July 1942, Louis de Rochemont's innovative documentary series The March of Time was distributed by RKO; at its peak in the late 1930s and early 1940s, over twenty million filmgoers saw its two-reelers each month in eleven thousand US and foreign theaters.

Lacking the financial resources of industry leaders MGM, Paramount, and Fox, RKO turned out many pictures during the era that belied their economies with high style in an Art Deco mode, exemplified by such Astaire–Rogers musicals as The Gay Divorcee (1934), their first pairing as leads, and Top Hat (1935). One of the figures most responsible for that style was another Selznick recruit: Van Nest Polglase, supervisor of RKO's highly regarded design department for almost a decade. Film historian James Naremore has described RKO as "chiefly a designer's studio. It never had a stable of important actors, writers, or directors, but ... it was rich in artists and special-effects technicians. As a result, its most distinctive pictures contained a strong element of fantasy—not so much the fantasy of horror, which during the thirties was the province of Universal, but the fantasy of the marvelous and adventurous."

As a group, the studio's craft divisions were among the strongest in the industry. Costumer Walter Plunkett, who worked with the company from the close of the FBO era through the end of 1939, was known as the top period wardrobist in the business. Sidney Saunders, innovative head of the studio's paint department, was responsible for significant progress in rear projection quality. On June 13, 1935, RKO premiered the first feature film shot entirely in advanced three-strip Technicolor, Becky Sharp. The movie was coproduced with Pioneer Pictures, founded by Cooper—who departed RKO after two years helming production—and John Hay "Jock" Whitney, who brought in his cousin Cornelius Vanderbilt Whitney; Cooper had successfully encouraged the Whitneys to purchase a major share of the Technicolor business as well. Although judged by critics a failure as drama, Becky Sharp was widely lauded for its visual brilliance and technical expertise. RKO also employed some of the industry's leading artists and craftsmen whose work was never seen. From the studio's earliest days through late 1935, Max Steiner, regarded by many historians as the most influential composer of the early years of sound cinema, made music for over 100 RKO films. His score for The Informer brought Steiner his third Oscar nomination and first win. Murray Spivack, head of the studio's audio special effects department, made important advances in the use of rerecording technology first heard in King Kong.

=== Briskin and Berman ===
In October 1935, the ownership team expanded, with financier Floyd Odlum leading a syndicate that bought 50 percent of RCA's stake in the company; the Rockefeller brothers, also major stockholders, increasingly became involved in the business. While RKO kept missing the mark in building Hepburn's career, other actors became regular headliners for the studio. Ann Sothern played the lead in seven RKO films between 1935 and 1937, paired five times with Gene Raymond. Stars Barbara Stanwyck and Cary Grant each signed on for several pictures. Both were sound-era trendsetters, working as freelancers under nonexclusive studio deals. Stanwyck had appeared in major studio films since 1929 without a binding long-term contract, as subsequently would several other top-billed women, including Dunne, Bennett, and Harding. When Grant went freelance after wrapping up his Paramount contract in late 1936, it was still rare for a leading man to do so while his star was on the rise.^{[f]} He ultimately appeared in fourteen RKO releases between 1937 and 1948.

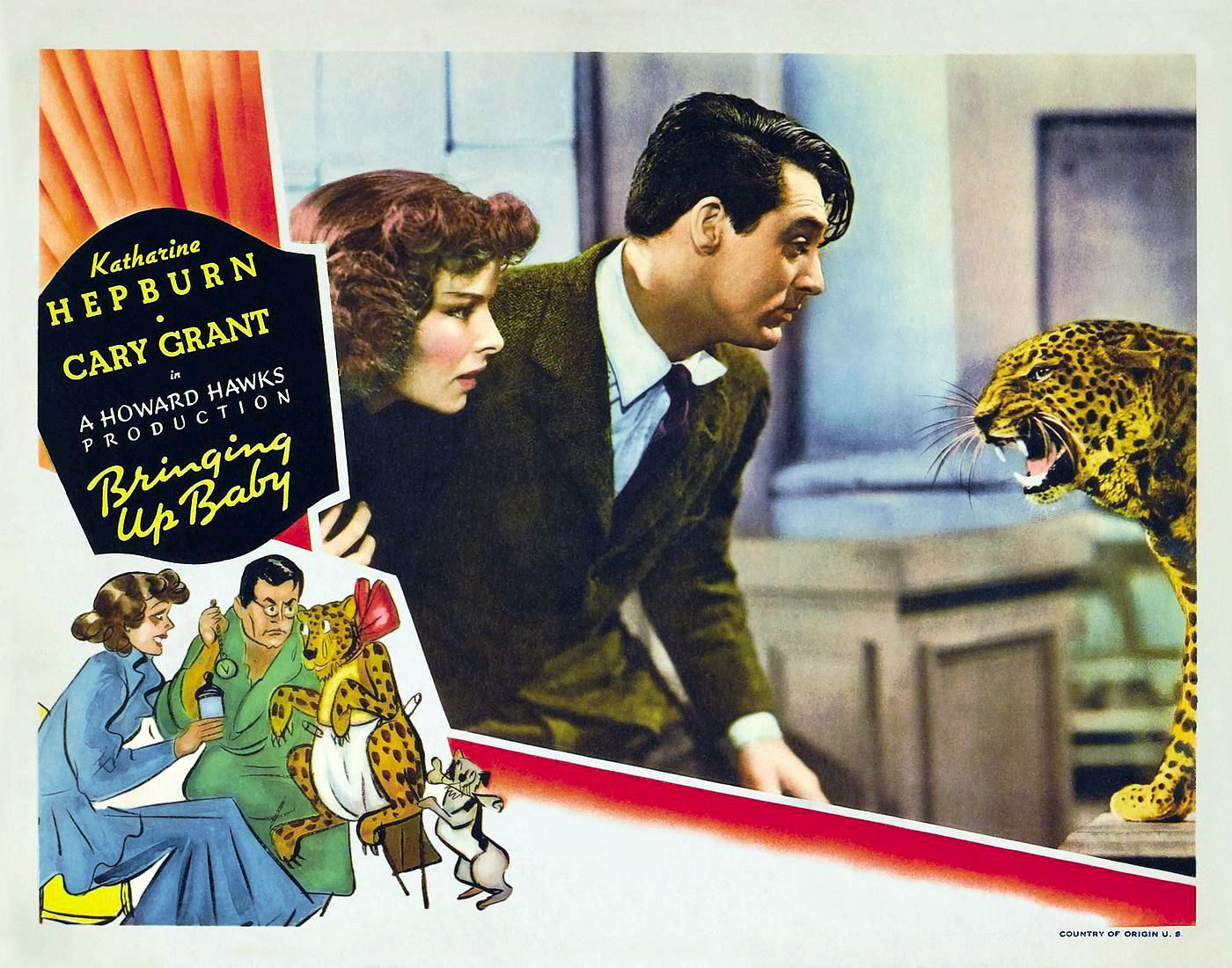
Katharine Hepburn's last film for RKO, Bringing Up Baby (1938), was a bomb. Today it is regarded as one of Hollywood's finest screwball comedies.

Soon after the appointment of a new production chief, Samuel Briskin, in late 1936, RKO entered into an important distribution deal with animator Walt Disney (Van Beuren consequently folded its cartoon operations). For nearly two decades, the studio released his company's features and shorts; Snow White and the Seven Dwarfs (1937) was the highest-grossing movie in the period between The Birth of a Nation (1915) and Gone with the Wind (1939). The theater operation excepted, on December 31, 1936, most of the domestic RKO subsidiaries, including RKO Distributing Corp. and its exchanges, were folded into RKO Radio Pictures Inc. Following the shift in print advertising a few years earlier, the screen brand on RKO's output, aside from the RKO Pathé line of newsreels and shorts, was likewise changed from "Radio Pictures" to "RKO Radio Pictures". In February 1937, Selznick, now a leading independent producer, took over RKO's Culver City studio and Forty Acres, as the backlot was known, under a long-term lease. Gone with the Wind, his coproduction with MGM, was largely shot there.^{[g]} In addition to its central Hollywood studio, RKO production now revolved around its Encino ranch. While the Disney association was beneficial, RKO's own product was widely seen as declining in quality and Briskin was gone by the end of the year.

Pandro Berman—who had filled in on three previous occasions—accepted the position of production chief on a noninterim basis. He left the job before the decade's turn, but his brief tenure resulted in some of the most notable films in studio history, including Gunga Din, with Grant and McLaglen; Love Affair, starring Dunne and Charles Boyer; and The Hunchback of Notre Dame (all 1939). Charles Laughton, who gave a now fabled performance as Quasimodo in the latter, returned periodically to the studio, headlining six more RKO features. For Maureen O'Hara, who made her American screen debut in the film, it was the first of ten pictures she made for RKO through 1952. Carole Lombard signed freelance deals for headlining roles in four films between 1939 and 1941—the last of her pictures to come out before her death in a plane crash. After costarring with Ginger Rogers for the eighth time in The Story of Vernon and Irene Castle (1939), Fred Astaire departed the studio.

The studio's B Western star of the period was George O'Brien, who made eighteen RKO pictures, sixteen between 1938 and 1940. The Saint in New York (1938) successfully launched a B detective series featuring the character Simon Templar that ran through 1943. The Wheeler and Woolsey comedy series ended in 1937 when Woolsey became ill (he died the following year). RKO filled the void by releasing independently produced features such as the Dr. Christian series and the Laurel and Hardy comedy The Flying Deuces (1939). The studio soon had its own new B comedy stars in Lupe Vélez and Leon Errol: The Girl from Mexico (1939) was followed by seven frantic installments of the Mexican Spitfire series between 1940 and 1943. The studio's technical departments maintained their reputation as industry leaders; Vernon Walker's special effects unit became famous for its sophisticated use of the optical printer and lifelike matte work, an art that reached its apex with 1941's Citizen Kane.

=== Kane and Schaefer's troubles ===
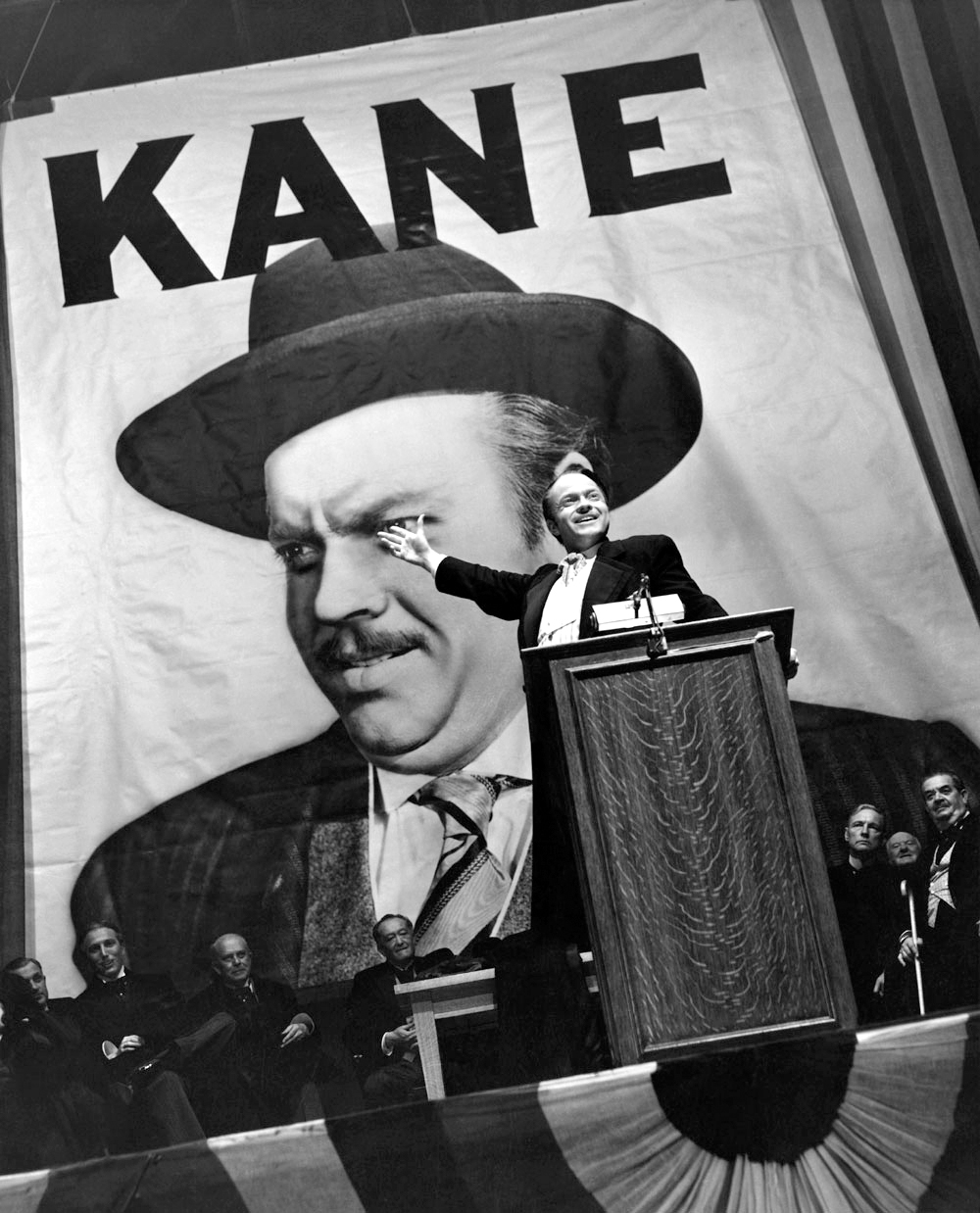
Orson Welles in the title role of Citizen Kane (1941), often cited as the greatest film of all time.

Pan Berman had received his first screen credit in 1925 as a nineteen-year-old assistant director on FBO's Midnight Molly. He departed RKO in December 1939 after policy clashes with studio president George J. Schaefer, handpicked the previous year by the Rockefellers and backed by Sarnoff. With Berman gone, Schaefer became in effect production chief, though other men—including the former head of the industry censorship board, Joseph I. Breen—nominally filled the role. Schaefer, announcing his philosophy with a new studio slogan, "Quality Pictures at a Premium Price", was keen on signing up independent producers whose films RKO would distribute. In 1941, the studio landed one of the most prestigious independents in Hollywood when it arranged to handle Samuel Goldwyn's productions. The first two Goldwyn pictures released by the studio did excellent box office: The Little Foxes, directed by William Wyler and starring Bette Davis, and the Howard Hawks–directed Ball of Fire also garnered four Oscar nominations apiece; the latter was Barbara Stanwyck's biggest hit under the RKO banner. However, Schaefer agreed to terms so favorable to Goldwyn that it was next to impossible for the studio to make money with his films. David O. Selznick loaned out his leading contracted director for two RKO pictures in 1941: Alfred Hitchcock's Mr. and Mrs. Smith, the final release of Carole Lombard's lifetime, was a modest success and Suspicion a substantial one, with an Oscar-winning turn by Joan Fontaine.^{[h]}

That May, having granted twenty-five-year-old star and director Orson Welles virtually complete creative control over the film, RKO released Citizen Kane.^{[i]} While it opened to strong reviews and went on to be hailed as one of the greatest films ever made, it lost money at the time and brought down the wrath of the Hearst newspaper chain on RKO. The next year saw the commercial failure of Welles' The Magnificent Ambersons—like Kane, critically lauded and overbudget—and the expensive embarrassment of his aborted documentary It's All True. The three Welles productions combined to drain $2 million from the RKO coffers, major money for a corporation that had reported an overall deficit of $1 million in 1940 and a nominal profit of a bit more than $500,000 in 1941.^{[j]} Many of RKO's other artistically ambitious pictures were also dying at the box office and it was losing its last exclusive deal with a major star as well. Rogers, after winning an Oscar in 1941 for her performance in the previous year's Kitty Foyle, held out for a freelance contract like Lombard's or Grant's. No star appeared in more RKO films than Rogers: thirty between 1931 and 1943, then one-offs in 1946 and 1956. On June 17, 1942, Schaefer tendered his resignation. He departed a weakened and troubled studio, but RKO was about to turn the corner. Propelled by the box-office boom of World War II and guided by new management, RKO made a strong comeback over the next half-decade.

=== Rebound under Koerner ===
By the end of June 1942, Floyd Odlum had taken over a controlling interest in the company via his Atlas Corporation, edging aside the Rockefellers and Sarnoff. Charles Koerner, former head of the RKO theater chain and allied with Odlum, had assumed the title of production chief some time prior to Schaefer's departure. With Schaefer gone, Koerner could actually do the job. Announcing a new corporate motto, "Showmanship in Place of Genius: A New Deal at RKO", a snipe at Schaefer's artistic ambitions in general and his sponsorship of Welles in particular, Koerner brought the studio much-needed stability until his death in February 1946. The change in RKO's fortunes was virtually immediate: corporate profits rose from $736,241 in 1942 (the theatrical division compensating for the studio's $2.34 million deficit) to $6.96 million the following year. The Rockefellers sold off their stock and, early in 1943, RCA dispensed with the last of its holdings in the company as well, cutting David Sarnoff's ties to the studio that was largely his conception. A new RKO Pathé "news magazine" series, This Is America, had been launched the previous October to take the place of The March of Time after Time Inc. switched its distribution to Twentieth Century-Fox. In June 1944, a subsidiary, RKO Television Corporation, was established to produce content for the fledgling medium. Talk Fast, Mister, an hour-long drama shot at the RKO Pathé studio in Manhattan and broadcast by the DuMont Laboratories–owned New York station WABD on December 18, 1944, was the first made-for-TV movie. In collaboration with Mexican businessman Emilio Azcárraga Vidaurreta, RKO established Estudios Churubusco in Mexico City in 1945.

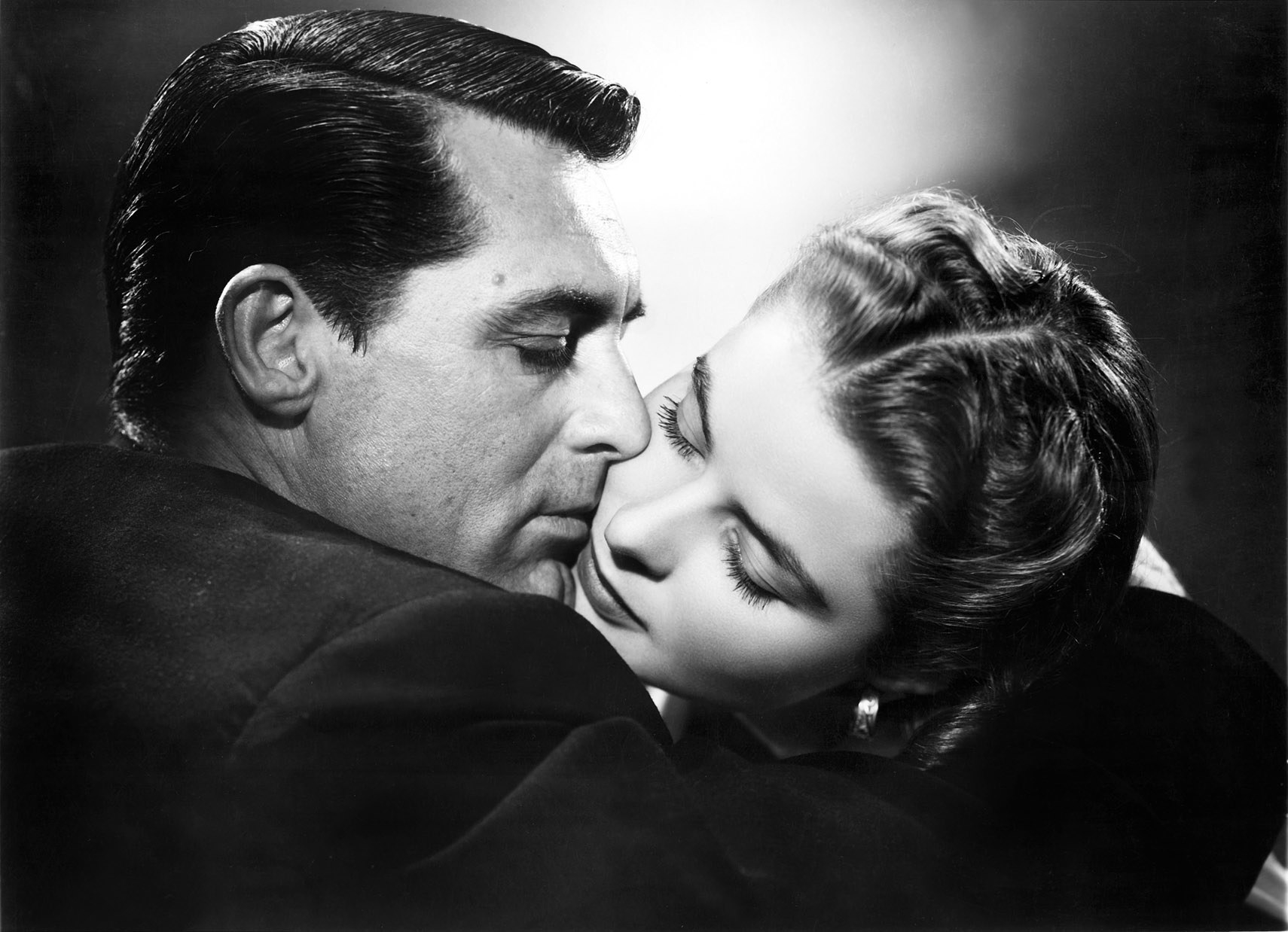
Cary Grant and Ingrid Bergman in Notorious (1946). RKO made over $1 million profit on the coproduction with David O. Selznick's Vanguard Films.

With RKO on increasingly secure ground, Koerner sought to increase its output of handsomely budgeted, star-driven features. However, the studio's only remaining major stars with anything like extended deals were Grant, whose services were shared with Columbia Pictures, and O'Hara, shared with Fox. Lacking in-house stars, Koerner and his successors under Odlum arranged with the other studios to loan out their biggest names or signed one of the growing number of freelance performers to short-term, "pay or play" deals. Thus RKO pictures of the mid- and late forties offered Bing Crosby, Henry Fonda, and others who were out of the studio's price range for extended contracts. John Wayne appeared in 1943's A Lady Takes a Chance while on loan from Republic Pictures; he was soon working regularly with RKO, making nine more movies for the studio. Gary Cooper appeared in RKO releases produced by Goldwyn and, later, the startup International Pictures, and Claudette Colbert starred in a number of RKO coproductions. Ingrid Bergman, on loan out from Selznick, starred opposite Bing Crosby in The Bells of St. Mary's (1945), a coproduction with director Leo McCarey. The top box-office film of the year, it turned a $3.7 million profit for RKO, the most in the company's history. Bergman returned in the coproductions Notorious (1946) and Stromboli (1950), and in the independently produced Joan of Arc (1948). Freelancing Randolph Scott appeared in one major RKO release annually from 1943 through 1948.

In similar fashion, many leading directors made one or more films for RKO during this era, including Alfred Hitchcock once more, with Notorious, and Jean Renoir, with This Land Is Mine (1943), reuniting Laughton and O'Hara, and The Woman on the Beach (1947). RKO and Orson Welles had an arm's-length reunion via The Stranger (1946), an independent production he starred in as well as directed. Welles later called it his worst film, but it was the only one he ever made that turned a profit in its first run. In December 1946, the studio released Frank Capra's It's a Wonderful Life; while it would eventually be recognized as one of the greatest films of Hollywood's Golden Age, at the time it lost more than half a million dollars for RKO. John Ford's The Fugitive (1947) and Fort Apache (1948), which appeared right before studio ownership changed hands again, were followed by She Wore a Yellow Ribbon (1949) and Wagon Master (1950); all four were coproductions between RKO and Argosy, the company run by Ford and RKO alumnus Merian C. Cooper. Of the directors under long-term contract to RKO in the 1940s, the best known was Edward Dmytryk, who first came to notice with the remarkably profitable Hitler's Children (1943). Shot on a $205,000 budget, placing it in the bottom quartile of Big Five studio productions, it was one of the ten biggest Hollywood hits of the year.^{[k]} Another low-cost war-themed film directed by Dmytryk, Behind the Rising Sun, released a few months later, was similarly profitable.

=== Focus on B movies ===
Film art at low budget: I Walked with a Zombie (1943), produced by Val Lewton and directed by Jacques Tourneur.

Much more than the other Big Five studios, RKO relied on B pictures to fill up its schedule. Of the thirty-one features released by RKO in 1944, for instance, ten were budgeted below $200,000, twelve were in the $200,000 to $500,000 range, and only nine cost more. In contrast, a clear majority of the features put out by the other top four studios were budgeted at over half a million dollars. A focus on B pictures limited the studio's financial risk; while it also limited the potential for reward (Dmytryk's extraordinary coups aside), RKO had a history of making better profits with its run-of-the-mill and low-cost product than with its A movies. The studio's low-budget films offered training opportunities for new directors, as well, among them Mark Robson, Robert Wise, and Anthony Mann. Film editors Robson and Wise received their first directing assignments with producer Val Lewton, whose specialized B horror unit also included the more experienced director Jacques Tourneur. The Lewton unit's moody, atmospheric work—represented by films such as Cat People (1942), I Walked with a Zombie (1943), and The Body Snatcher (1945)—is now highly regarded. Richard Dix concluded his lengthy RKO career with the 1943 Lewton production The Ghost Ship.

Tim Holt, who succeeded George O'Brien as RKO's cowboy star, appeared in forty-six B Westerns and more than fifty movies altogether for the studio, beginning in 1940. That same year, Chester Lauck and Norris Goff brought their famous comic characters Lum and Abner from radio to the screen for the first of six independently produced RKO releases. Between 1943 and 1946, the studio teamed contract actors Wally Brown and Alan Carney for comedies that openly mimicked the work of the wildly popular Abbott and Costello; Brown and Carney's eight pairings did not approach their prototypes' success. The Falcon detective series began in 1941; the Saint and the Falcon were so similar that Saint creator Leslie Charteris sued RKO. The Falcon was first played by George Sanders, who had appeared five times as the Saint. He bowed out after four Falcon films and was replaced by his brother, Tom Conway. Conway had a nine-film run in the part before the series ended in 1946. Johnny Weissmuller starred in six RKO Tarzan pictures for producer Sol Lesser between 1943 and 1948 before being replaced by Lex Barker for five more. Producer Herman Schlom oversaw a pair of four-film series, the comedic Great Gildersleeve (1943–44) and noirish Dick Tracy (1945–47).

Film noir, to which lower budgets lent themselves, became something of a house style at the studio; indeed, the RKO B Stranger on the Third Floor (1940) is widely seen as initiating noir's classic period. Its cinematographer, Nicholas Musuraca, who began at FBO in the 1920s and stayed with RKO through 1954, is a central figure in creating the look of classic noir. Design chief Albert D'Agostino—another long-termer, who succeeded Van Nest Polglase in 1941—and art director Walter Keller, along with others in the department, such as art directors Carroll Clark and Jack Okey and set decorator Darrell Silvera, are similarly credited. The studio's 1940s list of contract players was filled with noir regulars: Robert Mitchum (who graduated to major star status) and Robert Ryan each made no fewer than ten film noirs for RKO. Gloria Grahame, Jane Greer, and Lawrence Tierney were also notable studio players in the field. Freelancer George Raft starred in two noir hits: Johnny Angel (1945) and Nocturne (1946). Tourneur, Musuraca, Mitchum, and Greer, along with D'Agostino's design group, joined to make the A-budgeted Out of the Past (1947), now considered one of the greatest of all film noirs. Nicholas Ray began his directing career with the noir They Live by Night (1948), the first of a number of well-received films he made for RKO.

=== HUAC and Howard Hughes ===
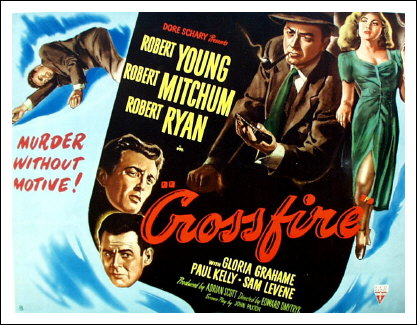
Crossfire (1947) was a hit, but no American studio would hire blacklisted director Edward Dmytryk again until he named names to HUAC in 1951. Producer Adrian Scott did not get another screen credit for two decades. He died before he could see it.

RKO, and the movie industry as a whole, had its most profitable year ever in 1946. A Goldwyn production released by RKO, The Best Years of Our Lives, was the most successful Hollywood film of the decade and won the Academy Award for Best Picture. But the legal status of the industry's reigning business model was increasingly being called into doubt: the U.S. Supreme Court ruled in Bigelow v. RKO that the company was liable for damages under antitrust statutes for having denied an independent movie house access to first-run films—a common practice among all of the Big Five. With profits at a high point, Floyd Odlum cashed in by selling off about 40 percent of his shares in the company to a group of investment firms. After Koerner's death, Radio-Keith-Orpheum president N. Peter Rathvon and RKO Radio Pictures president Ned E. Depinet had exchanged positions, with Depinet moving to the corporate offices in New York and Rathvon relocating to Hollywood and doubling as production chief while a permanent replacement was sought for Koerner. On the first day of 1947, producer and Oscar-winning screenwriter Dore Schary, who had been working at the studio on loan from Selznick, took over the role.

RKO appeared in good shape to build on its recent successes, but the year brought a number of unpleasant harbingers for all of Hollywood. The British government imposed a 75 percent tax on films produced abroad; along with similarly confiscatory taxes and quota laws enacted by other countries, this led to a sharp decline in foreign revenues. The postwar attendance boom peaked sooner than expected and television emerged as a competitor for audience interest. Across the board, profits fell—a 27 percent drop for the Hollywood studios from 1946 to 1947. In July, RKO Pathé's signature newsreel was sold to Warner Bros. for a reported $4 million. The phenomenon later called McCarthyism was building strength, and in October, the House Un-American Activities Committee (HUAC) began hearings into Communism in the motion picture industry. Two of RKO's top talents, Dmytryk and producer Adrian Scott, refused to cooperate. As a consequence, they were fired by RKO per the terms of the Waldorf Statement, the major studios' pledge to "eliminate any subversives". Scott, Dmytryk, and eight others who also defied HUAC—dubbed the Hollywood Ten—were blacklisted across the industry. Ironically, the studio's major success of the year was Crossfire, a Scott–Dmytryk film. Odlum concluded it was time to exit the film business, and he put Atlas' remaining RKO shares—approximately 25 percent of the outstanding stock—on the market. For her performance in The Farmer's Daughter (1947), a coproduction with Selznick's Vanguard Films, Loretta Young won the Best Actress Oscar the following March. It was the last major Academy Award for an RKO picture.

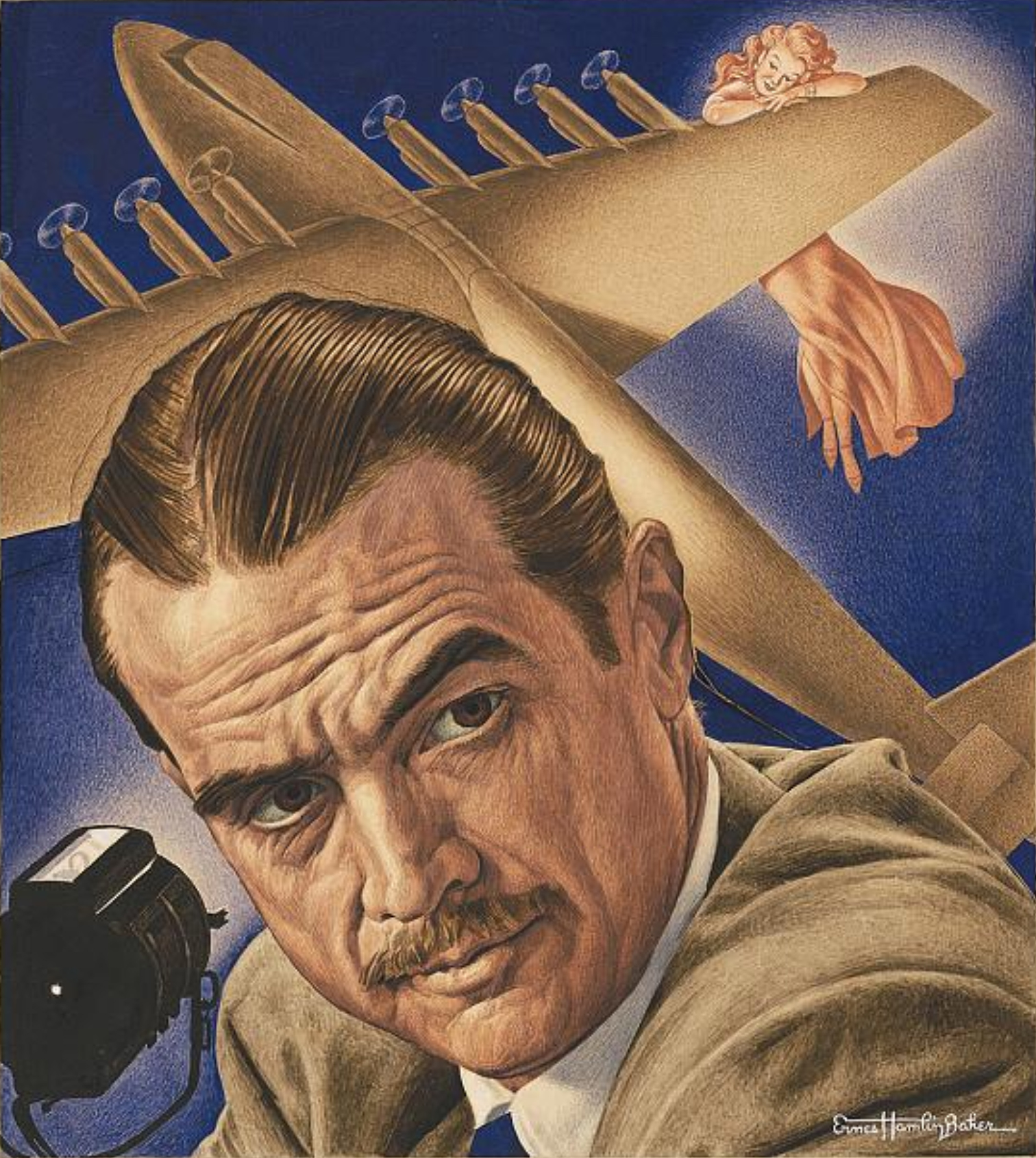
Howard Hughes, as depicted by Ernest Hamlin Baker for the cover of the July 19, 1948, issue of Time.

In May 1948, eccentric aviation tycoon and occasional movie producer Howard Hughes spent $8.8 million to gain control of the company, beating out British film magnate J. Arthur Rank for Odlum's stake. During Hughes' tenure, RKO suffered its worst years since the early 1930s, as his capricious management style took a heavy toll. Production chief Schary quit almost immediately due to his new boss' interference and Rathvon soon followed. Within weeks of taking over, Hughes had dismissed three-fourths of the work force; production was virtually shut down for six months as the conservative Hughes shelved or canceled several of the "message pictures" that Schary had backed. All of the Big Five saw their profits dwindle in 1948—from Fox, down 11 percent, to Loew's/MGM, down 62 percent—but at RKO they virtually vanished: from $5.1 million in 1947 to $0.5 million, a drop of 90 percent. The production-distribution end of the RKO business, now deep in the red, would never make a profit again.

Offscreen, Robert Mitchum's arrest and conviction for marijuana possession—he served two months in jail—was widely assumed to mean career death for RKO's most promising young star, but Hughes surprised the industry by announcing that his contract was not endangered. Of much broader significance, Hughes decided to get the jump on his Big Five competitors by being the first to settle the federal government's antitrust suit against the major studios, which had won a crucial Supreme Court ruling in United States v. Paramount Pictures, Inc. Under the consent decree he signed, Hughes agreed to dissolve the old parent company, Radio-Keith-Orpheum Corp., and split RKO's production-distribution business and its exhibition chain into two entirely separate corporations—RKO Pictures Corp. and RKO Theatres Corp.—with the obligation to promptly sell off one or the other. While Hughes delayed the divorcement procedure until December 1950 and did not actually sell his stock in the theater company for another three years, his decision to acquiesce was one of the crucial steps in the collapse of classical Hollywood's studio system.

=== Turmoil under Hughes ===
Shooting at RKO picked up again in early 1949, but from an average of around thirty films annually before Hughes' takeover, production fell to just twelve that year. Sporting the new title of managing director of production, Hughes quickly became notorious for meddling in minute filmmaking matters and promoting actresses he favored—including two under personal contract to him, Jane Russell and Faith Domergue. While his time at RKO was marked by both diminished production and a slew of expensive flops, the studio continued to turn out some well-received films under production chiefs Sid Rogell and Sam Bischoff, though both became fed up with Hughes' interloping and each in turn quit after less than two years. Bischoff was the last man to hold the job under Hughes. There were B noirs such as The Window (1949), which turned into a hit, and The Set-Up (1949), directed by Robert Wise and starring Robert Ryan, which won the Critic's Prize at the Cannes Film Festival. The Thing from Another World (1951), a science-fiction drama coproduced with Howard Hawks' Winchester Pictures, is seen as a classic of the genre. In 1952, RKO put out two films directed by Fritz Lang, Rancho Notorious and Clash by Night. The latter was a project of the renowned Jerry Wald–Norman Krasna production team, lured by Hughes from Warner Bros. with great fanfare in August 1950.

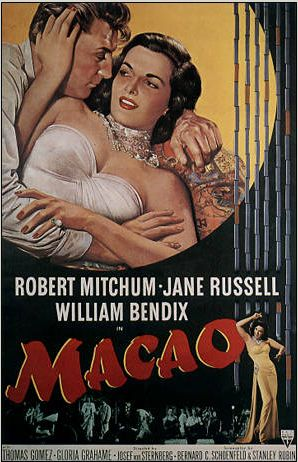
Robert Mitchum, RKO's most prolific lead of the late 1940s and early 1950s, costarred in Macao (1952) with Jane Russell, who was personally contracted to Howard Hughes. Director Josef von Sternberg's work was combined with scenes shot by Nicholas Ray and Mel Ferrer.

The company also began a close working relationship with Ida Lupino. She starred in two suspense films with Robert Ryan—Nicholas Ray's On Dangerous Ground (1952, though shooting had been completed two years earlier) and Beware, My Lovely (1952), a coproduction between RKO and Lupino's company, The Filmakers. Of more historic note, Lupino was Hollywood's only female director during the period; of the five pictures The Filmakers made with RKO, Lupino directed three, including her now celebrated The Hitch-Hiker (1953). Exposing many moviegoers to Asian cinema for the first time, RKO distributed Akira Kurosawa's epochal Rashomon in the United States, sixteen months after its original 1950 Japanese release. The only smash hits released by RKO in the 1950s came out during this period, but neither was an in-house production: Goldwyn's Hans Christian Andersen (1952) was followed by Disney's Peter Pan (1953). The first two shorts directed by a twenty-two-year-old photographer from the Bronx were both released in 1951 by RKO Pathé—Stanley Kubrick's Day of the Fight and Flying Padre.

In early 1952, Hughes fought off a lawsuit by screenwriter Paul Jarrico, who had been caught up in the latest round of HUAC hearings; Hughes had fired him and removed his name from the credits of a recent release, The Las Vegas Story, a money-losing melodrama starring Jane Russell. The studio owner subsequently ordered 100 RKO employees on "leave of absence" while he established a "security office" to oversee an ideological vetting system. "We are going to screen everyone in a creative or executive capacity", he declared. "The work of Communist sympathizers will not be used." As more credits were expunged, some in the industry began to question whether Hughes' hunt for subversives served primarily as a convenient rationale for further curtailing production and trimming expenses.

In September, Hughes and his corporate president, Ned Depinet, sold their RKO studio stock to a Chicago-based syndicate with no experience in the movie business; the syndicate's chaotic reign lasted until February 1953, when the stock and control were reacquired by Hughes. The studio's net loss in 1952 was over $10 million, and shooting had taken place for just a single in-house production over the last five months of the year. During the turmoil, Samuel Goldwyn ended his eleven-year-long distribution deal with RKO. Wald and Krasna escaped their contracts and the studio as well. The deal that brought the team to RKO had called for them to produce sixty features over five years; in just shy of half that time, they succeeded in making four. The Encino ranch shut down permanently in 1953 and the property was sold off. In November, Hughes finally fulfilled his obligations under the 1948 consent decree, divesting RKO Theatres; Albert A. List purchased the controlling interest in the business and renamed it List Industries. Hughes soon found himself the target of no fewer than five separate lawsuits filed by minority shareholders in RKO, accusing him of malfeasance in his dealings with the Chicago group and a wide array of acts of mismanagement. "RKO's contract list is down to three actors and 127 lawyers", quipped Dick Powell. Leery of the studio's mounting problems and sparring with it over the release of the forthcoming nature documentary The Living Desert, the Disney company exited its long-standing arrangement with RKO and set up its own distribution firm, Buena Vista. Contractual obligations meant that one last Disney feature would be released by RKO in 1954, and it continued to handle new Disney shorts into 1956.

Looking to forestall the impending legal imbroglio, by early 1954 Hughes was offering to buy out all of RKO's other stockholders. Before the end of the year, at a cost of $23.5 million, Hughes had gained near-total control of RKO Pictures Corp., becoming the first virtual sole owner of a studio since Hollywood's pioneer days—virtual, but not quite actual. Floyd Odlum reemerged to block Hughes' acquisition of the 95 percent ownership of RKO stock he needed to write off the company's losses against his earnings elsewhere. Hughes had reneged on his promise to give Odlum first option on buying the RKO theater chain when he divested it, and was now paying the price. With negotiations between the two at a stalemate, in July 1955, Hughes turned around and sold RKO Radio Pictures, Inc. to the General Tire and Rubber Company for $25 million, leaving himself and Odlum the shell of RKO Pictures Corp. and what were now, according to Fortune, its "sole assets ... $18 million in cash." For Hughes, this was the effective end of a quarter-century's involvement in the movie business. Historian Betty Lasky describes Hughes' relationship with RKO as a "systematic seven-year rape."

=== General Tire and demise ===
In taking control of the studio, General Tire restored RKO's close ties to broadcasting. General Tire had bought the Yankee Network, a New England regional radio network, in 1943. In 1950, it purchased the West Coast regional Don Lee Broadcasting System, and two years later, the Bamberger Broadcasting Service, owner of the WOR radio and television stations in New York City. The latter acquisition gave General Tire majority control of the Mutual Broadcasting System, one of America's leading radio networks. General Tire then merged its broadcasting interests into a new subsidiary, General Teleradio.

Thomas F. O'Neil, son of General Tire's founder William O'Neil and chairman of the broadcasting group, saw that the company's new television stations, indeed all TV outlets, were in need of programming. In September 1954, WOR-TV had launched the Million Dollar Movie program, running a single film for a week, twice every night plus Saturday and Sunday matinees; the format proved hugely successful and non-network-affiliated stations around the country were eager to emulate it. With the purchase of RKO, the studio's library was under O'Neil's control and he quickly put the rights to the 742 films to which RKO retained clear title up for sale. C&C Television Corp., a subsidiary of beverage maker Cantrell & Cochrane, won the bidding in December 1955 and was soon offering the films to independent stations in a package called "MovieTime USA". RKO Teleradio Pictures—the newly renamed General Teleradio, under which RKO Radio Pictures now operated as a business division—retained the broadcast rights for the cities where it owned TV stations.^{[l]} By 1956, RKO's classic movies were playing widely on television, often in the Million Dollar Movie format, allowing many to see such films as Citizen Kane and King Kong for the first time. The $15.2 million RKO made on the deal convinced the other major studios that their libraries held profit potential—a turning point in the way Hollywood did business.

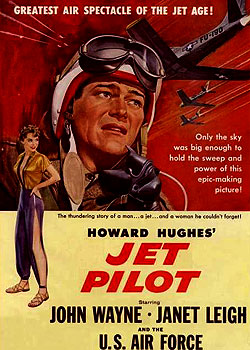
Jet Pilot, a Hughes pet production launched in 1949. Shooting wrapped in May 1951, but it was not released until 1957 due to his interminable tinkering. RKO was by then out of the distribution business. The movie was released by Universal-International.

The new owners of RKO made an initial effort to revive the studio, hiring veteran producer William Dozier to head production. In the first half of 1956, the production facilities were as busy as they had been in a half-decade, with a planned slate of seventeen features. RKO released Fritz Lang's final two American films, While the City Sleeps and Beyond a Reasonable Doubt (both 1956), but years of mismanagement had driven away many directors, producers, and stars. The studio was also saddled with the last of the inflated B movies such as Pearl of the South Pacific (1955) and The Conqueror (1956) that enchanted Hughes. While the latter, starring John Wayne, was the biggest hit produced at the studio during the decade, that bar was low—it placed only eleventh among the year's top earners. A major money loser in standard terms, its $4.5 million in North American rentals not coming close to covering its $6 million production cost, Hughes had paid RKO Teleradio millions to buy back the rights. In March 1956 came the news that RKO Pathé was being dissolved.

On January 22, 1957, after a year and a half without a notable success, RKO announced that it was closing its domestic distribution offices—Universal would take over most future releases—and that a reduced production wing would move to the Culver City lot. In fact, General Tire shut down RKO production for good. RKO's distribution deal with Disney was also fully revoked, allowing Buena Vista to handle distribution of all Disney short films. Overseas distribution exchanges were dispensed with: RKO Japan Ltd. was sold to Disney and the British Commonwealth Film Corporation in July 1957, and RKO Radio Pictures Ltd. in the UK was dissolved a year later. The Hollywood and Culver City facilities were sold in late 1957 for $6.15 million to Desilu Productions, owned by Desi Arnaz and Lucille Ball, who had been an RKO contract player from 1935 to 1942. Desilu was acquired by Gulf and Western Industries in 1967 and merged into G+W's other production company, neighboring Paramount Pictures; the former RKO Hollywood studio, FBO's old home, is now part of the Paramount lot. The renovated Culver City studio, where DeMille once reigned, is now owned and operated as an independent production facility. Forty Acres, the Culver City backlot, was razed in the mid-1970s. List Industries, the former RKO Theatres Corp., was bought by Glen Alden Corp. in 1959. Glen Alden acquired Stanley Warner Theatres in 1967, creating RKO–Stanley Warner Theatres. Cinerama purchased the exhibition circuit from Glen Alden in 1971.

Now little more than a name and beneficiary of General Tire's doubtful largesse, RKO announced in early 1958 that it would continue as a financial backer, coproducing independently made pictures. Fewer than half a dozen resulted. The final RKO film, Verboten!, a coproduction with director Samuel Fuller's Globe Enterprises, was released, fitfully, beginning in March 1959, first by Rank and then Columbia. That same year, "Pictures" was stripped from the corporate identity; the holding company for General Tire's broadcasting operation and the few remaining motion picture assets was renamed RKO General.^{[m]} In the words of scholar Richard B. Jewell, "The supreme irony of RKO's existence is that the studio earned a position of lasting importance in cinema history largely because of its extraordinarily unstable history. Since it was the weakling of Hollywood's 'majors,' RKO welcomed a diverse group of individualistic creators and provided them ... with an extraordinary degree of freedom to express their artistic idiosyncrasies.... [I]t never became predictable and it never became a factory."

=== Later incarnations ===
In 1978, RKO General launched a new subsidiary, RKO Pictures Inc. Following this, RKO became involved in the coproduction of a number of feature films and TV projects, beginning with 1981's Carbon Copy. In collaboration with Universal Studios, RKO put out five films over the next three years. Although the studio frequently worked with major names—including Burt Reynolds and Dolly Parton in The Best Little Whorehouse in Texas, Jack Nicholson in The Border, and Nastassja Kinski in Cat People (all 1982)—it met with little success.

Corporate restructuring brought RKO General under the aegis of the new holding company GenCorp, and starting with the Meryl Streep vehicle Plenty (1985), RKO Pictures took on more projects as sole studio backer. In January 1986, Paramount signed a two-year distribution agreement with the company. Films such as the erotic thriller Half Moon Street (1986) and the Vietnam War drama Hamburger Hill (1987) followed, but production ended as GenCorp underwent a massive reorganization following an attempted hostile takeover.

With RKO General dismantling its broadcast business, RKO Pictures Inc., along with the original RKO studio's trademarks, remake rights, and other remaining assets, was put up for sale. After a bid by RKO Pictures' own management team failed, the managers made a deal with Wesray Capital Corporation—under the control of former US treasury secretary William E. Simon and investor Ray Chambers—to buy RKO through Entertainment Acquisition Co., a newly created purchasing entity. The sale was completed in late 1987, and Wesray linked RKO with its Six Flags amusement parks to form RKO/Six Flags Entertainment Inc.

In 1989, RKO Pictures, which had produced no films while under Wesray control, was sold off yet again. Actress and Post Cereals heiress Dina Merrill and her husband, producer Ted Hartley, acquired a majority interest and merged the company with their own Pavilion Communications. After a brief period as RKO/Pavilion, the business was reorganized as RKO Pictures LLC. With the inaugural RKO production under Hartley and Merrill's ownership, False Identity (1990), the company also stepped into the distribution business. In 1992, it handled the well-regarded independent production Laws of Gravity, directed by Nick Gomez. RKO's next significant film came in 1998 with Mighty Joe Young, a remake of a 1949 RKO movie that was itself a King Kong knockoff; the Disney coproduction was distributed by Buena Vista. In the early 2000s, the company was involved as a coproducer of TV movies and modestly budgeted features, about one a year. In 2003, it coproduced a Broadway stage version of the 1936 Astaire–Rogers vehicle Swing Time, under the title Never Gonna Dance.

That same year, RKO Pictures entered into a legal battle with Wall Street Financial Associates (WSFA). Hartley and Merrill claimed that the owners of WSFA fraudulently induced them into signing an acquisition agreement by concealing their "cynical and rapacious" plans to purchase RKO, with the intention only of dismantling it. WSFA sought a preliminary injunction prohibiting RKO's majority owners from selling their interests in the company to any third parties. The WSFA motion was denied in July 2003, freeing RKO to deal with another potential purchaser, InternetStudios.com. In 2004, that planned sale fell through when InternetStudios.com apparently folded. The company's minimal involvement in new film production continued to focus on its remake rights: Are We Done Yet?, based on Mr. Blandings Builds His Dream House (1948), was released in April 2007 to dismal reviews. In 2009, Beyond a Reasonable Doubt, a remake of a 1956 RKO film directed by Fritz Lang, fared even worse critically, receiving a 7% rating on Rotten Tomatoes. A stage version of Top Hat toured Great Britain in the second half of 2011. The most recent RKO film coproductions are the well-received A Late Quartet (2012) and the 2015 flop Barely Lethal. Two months after Dina Merrill's May 22, 2017 death, independent producer Keith Patterson sued RKO, Hartley, and his second-in-command, Mary Beth O'Connor, over the collapse of plans to create multiple TV series based on RKO properties, starting with Citizen Kane. According to Patterson's suit, O'Connor controls access to Hartley and holds both his healthcare proxy and an option to acquire RKO and its intellectual property at a deep markdown after his death. As of November 2022, Hartley, then 98 years old, was still making public appearances connected with his avocation as a painter.

RKO Pictures was sold off to Concord's film and TV division in 2025 alongside the derivative rights to more than 5,000 titles. It will continue to operate as its own imprint under Concord Originals.

== Logos ==
The "Transmitter" logo used by RKO Radio Pictures from 1929 to 1957

Classic closing logo of RKO Radio Pictures

Most of the films released by RKO Radio Pictures between 1929 and 1957 have an opening logo displaying the studio's famous trademark, a spinning globe and radio tower, nicknamed the "Transmitter". It was inspired by a 200-foot (61 m) tower built in Colorado for a giant electrical amplifier, or Tesla coil, created by inventor Nikola Tesla. For many years, the RKO tower beeped out the Morse code for "A Radio Picture" (although during much of World War II, "V for Victory" was substituted). Orson Welles referred to the Transmitter as his "favorite among the old logos, not just because it was so often a reliable portent.... It reminds us to listen." The RKO Pathé feature logo replaced the radio tower with the Pathé brand's hallmark rooster, who stood stock-still as the world turned beneath his feet. RKO's closing logo, an inverted triangle enclosing a thunderbolt, was also a well-known trademark. Instead of the Transmitter, many Disney and Goldwyn films released by the studio originally appeared with colorful versions of the RKO closing logo as part of the main title sequence. For decades, re-releases of these films had Disney/Buena Vista and MGM/Goldwyn logos replacing the RKO insignia, but the originals were restored in many DVD editions. In the 1990s, the Hartley–Merrill RKO Pictures commissioned a new, CGI version of the Transmitter.

== Library ==
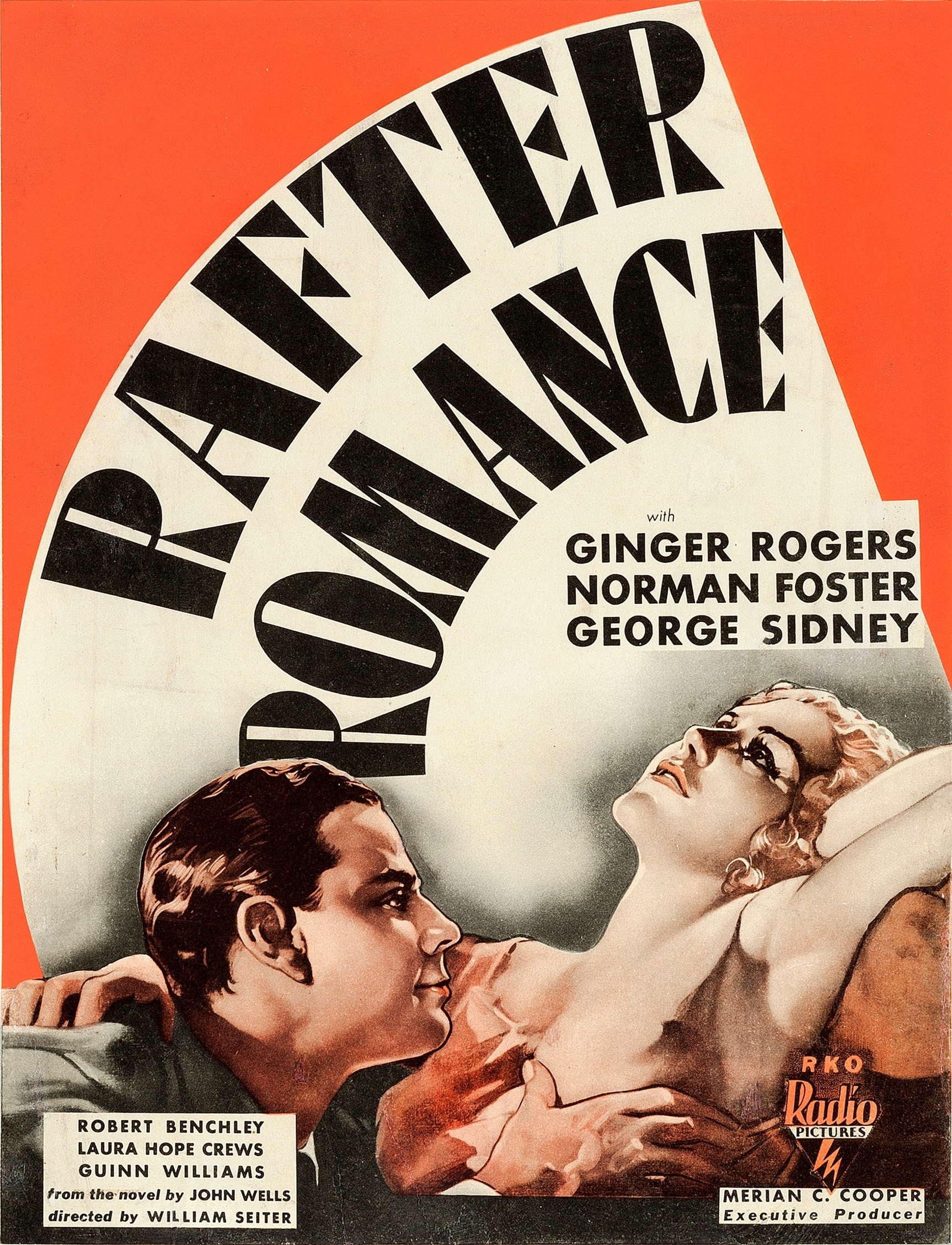
The pre-Code Rafter Romance (1933), one of the "lost" films long held by Merian Cooper, debuted four months before Ginger Rogers' first pairing with Fred Astaire. Costar Norman Foster later directed Journey into Fear (1943) and Rachel and the Stranger (1948) for RKO.

RKO Pictures LLC. owned the RKO Radio Pictures, Inc. film copyrights, trademarks, and story library, with title to more than 500 screenplays (giving it the right to produce remakes, sequels, and prequels) and approximately 900 unproduced scripts from 1989 to 2025.^{[n]} The actual films and their television, video, and theatrical distribution rights were in other hands from 1989 to 2025.

In 1971, the US and Canadian TV—and consequently, video—rights to most of the RKO film library were sold at auction after the holders, TransBeacon (a corporate descendant of C&C Television), went bankrupt. The auctioned rights were split between United Artists (UA) and Marian B. Inc. (MBI). In 1984, MBI created a subsidiary, Marian Pictures Inc. (MBP), to which it transferred its share of the RKO rights. Two years later GenCorp's subsidiaries, RKO General and RKO Pictures, repurchased the rights then controlled by MBP. In the meantime, United Artists had been acquired by MGM. In 1986, MGM/UA's considerable library, including its RKO film negatives and rights, was bought by Turner Broadcasting System for its new Turner Entertainment Co. division. When Turner announced plans to colorize ten of the RKO films, GenCorp resisted, claiming copyright infringement, leading to both sides filing lawsuits. During RKO Pictures' brief Wesray episode, Turner acquired many of the distribution rights that had returned to RKO via MBP, as well as both the theatrical rights and the TV rights originally held back from C&C for the cities where RKO owned stations. The new owners of RKO also allowed Turner to move forward with colorization of the library. Early in 1989, Turner declared that no less than the historic Citizen Kane would be colorized; upon review of Welles' ironclad creative contract with RKO, that plan was abandoned. On October 10, 1996, Turner was merged into Time Warner (now part of Skydance Corporation), owning the bulk of the RKO library and controls its distribution in North America since 1996. In 2007, Warners' Turner Classic Movies channel obtained the rights to six "lost" RKO films that Merian Cooper acquired in a 1946 legal settlement with his former employer and later transferred to a business associate as a tax shelter. After Ted Hartley's October 10, 2025 death, Warner Bros. (via Turner Entertainment Co.) currently owns the bulk of the RKO library and controls its worldwide distribution on behalf of RKO Pictures.

With Skydance Corporation's acquisition of Warner Bros in 2026, part of RKO's library was reunited. Most Samuel Goldwyn films are owned by his estate and administered by Warner Bros. in North America and Miramax—in which Skydance Corporation currently holds a 49 percent stake—internationally. It's a Wonderful Life, coproduced by Frank Capra's Liberty Films, and The Bells of St. Mary's, coproduced by Leo McCarey's Rainbow Productions, are now owned by Skydance Corporation, through its predecessor Viacom's indirect acquisition of the latter-day Republic Pictures, formerly National Telefilm Associates.

The Disney films originally distributed by RKO are owned and fully controlled by the Walt Disney Company, as is the 1940 RKO adaptation of Swiss Family Robinson, purchased by Disney prior to its 1960 remake. Notorious, a coproduction between RKO and David Selznick's Vanguard Films, is now owned by Disney through ABC; and it is currently licensed to the Criterion Collection.

Rights to many other independent productions distributed by the studio, as well as some notable coproductions, are in new hands. The Stranger, from William Goetz's International Pictures, has been in the public domain since 1973. Eighteen films produced by RKO itself in 1930–31, including Dixiana, were also allowed to fall into the public domain, as were several later in-house productions, including high-profile releases such as The Animal Kingdom, Bird of Paradise, Of Human Bondage, Love Affair, The Hunchback of Notre Dame, and They Knew What They Wanted. In early 1956, Hughes bought his beloved Jet Pilot and The Conqueror—along with a Jane Russell vehicle, The Outlaw (1943), he had produced independently and sold to RKO before acquiring the studio—back from RKO Teleradio. Hughes failed to renew the copyright on The Outlaw, and it is now in the public domain. In 1979, three years after Hughes' death, Universal acquired the rights to The Conqueror.

=== European rights ===
Ownership of the major European TV and video distribution rights to the RKO library differs by country: In the UK, the RKO rights, long held by Universal Studios, are now under Warner Bros.' control. The German rights were acquired in 1969 by the Kirch Group on behalf of its KirchMedia division, which went bankrupt in 2002. EOS Entertainment's Beta Film purchased many of KirchMedia's rights in 2004, and the library as of 2010 was distributed by Kineos, created five years earlier as a Beta Film–KirchMedia joint venture. At the end of 2014, Warners took over the French rights from longtime distributor Éditions Montparnasse. Rome's Red Film claims the rights in Italy. As of 2011, Vértice 360 held the Spanish rights.

== See also ==
- List of film production companies

== Notes ==
1. The claim in the January 1928 New York Times article cited here that FBO would be able to book its films "in practically 700 theatres which make up the Keith-Albee-Orpheum circuits and affiliated houses in America and Canada" is misleading. First, "affiliated houses" almost certainly constituted the vast majority of that figure. Time (1927) indicates that, as of May 1927, Keith-Albee (legally the B. F. Keith Corp.) had 50 theaters and Orpheum had 47—presumably counts of their fully owned venues. More important, per Jewell (2012): "Many of the vaudeville houses would not be converted into sound film theaters. In actuality, the original chain of K-A-O motion picture theaters would number fewer than two hundred" (p. 14). Crafton (1997) refers to "KAO and its 200 theaters" at the time of RKO's founding (p. 141) and states that in 1930, "The number of theaters owned outright by RKO increased to 180" (p. 208). While he references no contemporary sources for those figures, he does cite Film Daily in a description of RKO as controlling 250 theaters in mid-1930, following the major studios' "buying binge" (p. 256: "Big 6 Have Less than 20% of Houses". Film Daily. July 9, 1930. pp. 1–2.) Schatz (1998) describes an "RKO chain of 161 theaters" around the time David O. Selznick became production chief in October 1931 (p. 128).
  Moving forward nearly a decade, Schatz (1999) writes that, as of 1940, RKO had "slightly more than 100 theaters" (p. 17). He explains that "the figures on studio-affiliated theaters vary considerably, owing to the number of houses in which the studios held only partial interest—as little as 5 percent in some cases" (p. 484, n. 24). Supporting Schatz's 1940 tally, that November, Radio-Keith-Orpheum Corp. submitted a court filing in an antitrust case stating that the company and its exhibition subsidiaries operated 103 theaters, of which 43 were in New York City. A 1944 book, Economic Control of the Motion Picture Industry, includes the table "Theater holdings of the major companies are approximately as follows"—RKO is listed as holding 222 theaters. Lasky (1989) indicates that a 1953 Fortune article tallied the RKO circuit in 1948, at the time of Hughes' purchase, at "124 theaters, plus a share in about 75 others" (p. 205). Porst (2015) states then when RKO agreed, in late 1948, to divest its theaters, it had "only 109" (p. 115).
2. The online edition of Encyclopædia Britannica erroneously states that RKO resulted "from the merger of the Radio Corporation of America, the Keith-Albee-Orpheum theatre chain, and the American Pathé production firm." See "RKO Radio Pictures, Inc." (retrieved October 22, 2022). Many other sources make the same false claim. Note also the following:
  - Some sources incorrectly describe Keith-Albee-Orpheum as the union of three theater chains; in fact the name describes the union of just two chains, B. F. Keith Corp. (doing business as Keith-Albee) and Orpheum Circuit Inc. Edward F. Albee was Benjamin F. Keith's right-hand man. He took over the company after the deaths of its founder, in 1914, and his son, A. Paul Keith, four years later.
  - Some sources—e.g., Grand Design: Hollywood as a Modern Business Enterprise, 1930–1939, by Tino Balio (Berkeley, Los Angeles, and London: University of California Press, 1995), p. 16—incorrectly claim that RCA Photophone was "amalgamated" or "combined" with FBO and KAO under the Radio-Keith-Orpheum holding company. It was not.
  - Many sources—e.g., Balio (1995), p. 16 again—incorrectly give FBO's full name as "Film Booking Office of America"; the proper name is Film Booking Offices of America, which may be confirmed by examining its official logo.
3. The standard reference guide to the studio's films, The RKO Story, by Richard B. Jewell, with Vernon Harbin (New York: Arlington House/Crown, 1982), is used as the final arbiter of whether specific films made between 1929 and 1957 were RKO solo productions, coproductions, or completely independent productions. Official year of release is also per The RKO Story.
4. Only one previous sound film had cost more than $1 million, and just barely: Noah's Ark (1928), from Warner Bros. Several silent epics had also surpassed the mark.
5. For an example of US print advertising's switch to the RKO Radio Pictures brand at the beginning of the 1932–33 exhibition season, see this original poster for The Most Dangerous Game, which premiered September 9, 1932.
6. Grant biographer Graham McCann's paean, "No one of [Grant's] stature had contemplated acting as a freelance performer since the days before the studio system took hold of Hollywood", ignores two women: Stanwyck and Miriam Hopkins had both previously gone freelance before they were major box-office draws or Oscar nominees (Becky Sharp, Hopkins' freelance debut, garnered her first and only Academy Award nomination). It also overlooks one man who took that route when of comparable youth and as yet forming "stature": among still-ascendant male stars, Grant was preceded as a freelancer by Fredric March, admittedly more established when he bid on himself in 1933. In July 1935, Variety identified other prior male members of the "itinerant class": Leslie Howard (eleven years Grant's senior), easing-out-of-his-prime Adolphe Menjou, well-past-his-prime Richard Barthelmess, evergreen Walter Huston, B-movie lead Lee Tracy, and character actor Edward Everett Horton. Ronald Colman (thirteen years Grant's senior) had also freelanced since 1934. For a discussion of the terms and application of the "option contract" standard in Hollywood for most of the 1930s, binding an actor for seven years while giving the studio the "option" every six months to terminate them (the actor had no reciprocal "option" to walk away), see Regev (2018), pp. 123–27.
7. By August 1940, the lease was no longer exclusive—see "Screen News Here and in Hollywood," New York Times, August 28, 1940. By mid-1949, Selznick had left the studio entirely—see two articles by Thomas F. Brady: "Republic to Make Film on Baseball," New York Times, April 8, 1949; and "Hollywood Buys More Stories," New York Times, May 1, 1949.
8. Thomas Schatz's brief description of Mr. and Mrs. Smith as a "critical and commercial failure" is evidently incorrect. According to historian Leonard Leff, "Mr. and Mrs. Smith had a happy ending: good reviews and modest box office success." Emily Carman, who examined the studio ledgers, describes it as an unqualified "box-office success, with total domestic and foreign gross amounting to $1,311,855, thus bringing in $582,000 in total profits for RKO." Ed Sikov characterizes it as a "solid commercial hit". Donald Spoto's report on its release lends further support to this position. United Artists' To Be or Not to Be (1942), headlined by Lombard, was released a month after her death.
9. Though Citizen Kane was technically structured through a set of three contracts originally drawn up in 1939 as a coproduction between RKO and Welles' then newly formed Mercury Productions Inc. (and, indeed, was billed on a title card as "A Mercury Production"), in bottom-line terms it was an RKO production: the studio provided the entire budget and production facilities, assumed all the financial risk, and held all the rights once Welles delivered his final, inviolable cut.
10. Citizen Kane lost $150,000–$160,000 on original release (the production cost was precisely $805,527.53); The Magnificent Ambersons lost $624,000 (production cost $1.125 million); and the unreleased It's All True cost the studio an estimated $1.2 million. The studio operation itself was almost certainly a bigger money-loser than the cited figures suggest, with profits coming from the corporation's theatrical division.
11. Jewell (1982) states that it "attracted $3,355,000 in film rentals" (p. 181); Lasky (1989) refers to an article in The Hollywood Reporter on the film, published seven months after its premiere, predicting it "would do better than $3 million in the U.S. alone" (p. 185). It is not listed in Schatz's (1999) appendix of annual top box-office films of the 1940s (p. 466), based on a 1992 Variety reckoning, perhaps because of its unusual production history. Assuming Jewell's figure is accurate, and the Schatz/Variety list is otherwise accurate and complete, Hitler's Children was the ninth biggest earner of 1943, an impressive feat for a movie with a B budget and star (Tim Holt).
12. While the historical record is not definitive as to whether RKO Radio Pictures was reorganized as an integrated division of RKO Teleradio Pictures Inc. or maintained as a legal subsidiary, the weight of the available evidence clearly points to the former. According to the November 1955 Television Digest item cited herein, General Tire planned to organize RKO Teleradio Pictures Inc. "into 2 main divisions—General Teleradio and RKO Radio Pictures." In addition, twenty-one items in the July–December 1959 Library of Congress Catalog of Copyright Entries for "Motion Pictures and Filmstrips—Renewal Registrations" reference "RKO Radio Pictures, a division of RKO Teleradio Pictures Inc." (pp. 91, 92, 94–98, 100; two similar mentions on p. 95 follow "RKO Radio Pictures" with "Inc."). The listing of "RKO Radio Pictures Inc." in the Name Index on p. 106 is evidently of the same order—original "producing and releasing companies" (p. 101)—as that of "RKO Pathe Pictures Inc.," which was certainly no longer an operational subsidiary by this point.
13. Many online sources give RKO General's year of inception as 1958, without evidence; O'Neill's 1959 dating is supported by the fact that there is no mention of RKO General in either the New York Times or the Los Angeles Times before February 1960. Following evidently informal references dating back years to "RKO–General Teleradio" or "RKO General Teleradio," the first definitive mention of "RKO General" in Variety appears in the August 24, 1960, edition. A 1961 plaintiff's exhibit filed in a C&C lawsuit against RKO General (while it apparently errs in suggesting that General Teleradio was merged into RKO Radio Pictures rather than the other way around) asserts that "in or about the month of October, 1959, RKO Teleradio Pictures, Inc. changed its name to RKO General, Inc."
14. RKO Pictures LLC., while it owned the copyright to the original movie and its 1933 sequel, did not control the remake or other ancillary rights to what would be by far its most valuable property: King Kong. Certain elements of the concept are in the public domain, while some are controlled by the Merian Cooper estate and Universal Pictures, among others.

== Sources ==
- Ballinger, Alexander, and Danny Graydon (2007). The Rough Guide to Film Noir. London: Rough Guides. ISBN 1-84353-474-6
- Barrier, Michael (2003). Hollywood Cartoons: American Animation in Its Golden Age. New York: Oxford University Press. ISBN 0-19-516729-5
- Barrier, Michael (2008). The Animated Man: A Life of Walt Disney. Berkeley: University of California Press. ISBN 978-0-520-25619-4
- Barrios, Richard (1995). A Song in the Dark: The Birth of the Musical Film. New York: Oxford University Press. ISBN 0-19-508811-5
- Beauchamp, Cari (2009). Joseph P. Kennedy Presents: His Hollywood Years. New York: Knopf. ISBN 978-1400040001
- Boddy, William (1990). Fifties Television: The Industry and Its Critics. Urbana and Chicago: University of Illinois Press. ISBN 0-252-06299-X
- Bordwell, David, Janet Staiger, and Kristin Thompson (1985). The Classical Hollywood Cinema: Film Style & Mode of Production to 1960. New York: Columbia University Press. ISBN 0-231-06054-8
- Bradley, Edwin M. (1996). The First Hollywood Musicals: A Critical Filmography of 171 Features, 1927 Through 1932. Jefferson, NC: McFarland. ISBN 0-7864-2029-4
- Brady, Frank (1990 [1989]). Citizen Welles: A Biography of Orson Welles. New York: Anchor. ISBN 0-385-26759-2
- Brown, Peter Harry, and Pat H. Broeske (2004). Howard Hughes: The Untold Story. New York: Da Capo. ISBN 0-306-81392-0
- Brunelle, Ray (1996). "The Art of Sound Effects", Experimental Musical Instruments 12, nos. 1 and 2 (September and December). ISSN 0883-0754
- Carman, Emily (2012). "'Women Rule Hollywood': Ageing and Freelance Stardom in the Studio System", in Female Celebrity and Ageing: Back in the Spotlight, ed. Deborah Jermyn, pp. 15–26. Abingdon and New York: Routledge. ISBN 978-0-415-83236-6
- Carman, Emily (2016). Independent Stardom: Freelance Women in the Hollywood Studio System. Austin: University of Texas Press. ISBN 978-1-4773-0731-1
- Carman, Emily (2020). "Going Independent in 1930s Hollywood: Freelance Star and Independent Producer Collaborations at United Artists", in United Artists, ed. Peter Krämer, Gary Needham, Yannis Tzioumakis, and Tino Balio, pp. 57–74. Abingdon and New York: Routledge. ISBN 978-0-367-17898-7
- Conant, Michael (1981). "The Paramount Decrees Reconsidered", in The American Film Industry, ed. Tino Balio, pp. 537–73. Madison: University of Wisconsin Press. ISBN 0-299-09874-5
- Cook, Pam (2007). The Cinema Book, 3d ed. London: BFI Publishing. ISBN 1-84457-192-0
- Cotta Vaz, Mark, and Craig Barron (2002). The Invisible Art: The Legends of Movie Matte Painting. San Francisco: Chronicle Books. ISBN 978-0-8118-4515-1
- Cox, Jim (2009). American Radio Networks: A History. Jefferson, NC: McFarland. ISBN 978-0-7864-4192-1
- Crafton, Donald (1997). The Talkies: American Cinema's Transition to Sound, 1926–1931. New York: Charles Scribner's Sons. ISBN 0-684-19585-2
- Crosby, Michael (2009). Encino. Charleston, SC: Arcadia. ISBN 0-7385-6991-7
- Culhane, John (1999). Walt Disney's Fantasia. New York: Harry N. Abrams. ISBN 0-8109-8078-9
- Denisoff, R. Serge (1986). Tarnished Gold: The Record Industry Revisited. Piscataway, NJ: Transaction. ISBN 0-88738-618-0
- Deyo, L. B., and David Leibowitz (2003). Invisible Frontier: Exploring the Tunnels, Ruins, and Rooftops of Hidden New York. New York: Random House. ISBN 0-609-80931-8
- Di Battista, Maria (2001). Fast-Talking Dames. New Haven, CT, and London: Yale University Press. ISBN 0-300-08815-9
- Dīck, Bernard F. (2021). Engulfed: The Death of Paramount Pictures and the Birth of Corporate Hollywood. Lexington: University Press of Kentucky. ISBN 978-0-8131-5135-9
- Dickstein, Morris (2002). "Bringing Up Baby (1938)", in The A List: The National Society of Film Critics' 100 Essential Films, ed. Jay Carr, pp. 48–50. Cambridge, MA: Da Capo. ISBN 0-306-81096-4
- Dietrich, Noah, and Bob Thomas (1972). Howard, The Amazing Mr. Hughes. Greenwich, CT: Fawcett Publications. ISBN 0-449-13652-3
- Dixon, Wheeler W. (2005). Lost in the Fifties: Recovering Phantom Hollywood. Carbondale: Southern Illinois University Press. ISBN 0-8093-2653-1
- Dombrowski, Lisa (2008). The Films of Samuel Fuller: If You Die, I'll Kill You! Middletown, CT: Wesleyan University Press. ISBN 978-0-8195-6866-3
- Erickson, Hal (2012). Military Comedy Films: A Critical Survey and Filmography of Hollywood since 1918. Jeferson, NC: McFarland. ISBN 978-0-7864-6290-2
- Erickson, Hal (2020). A Van Beuren Production: A History of the 619 Cartoons, 875 Live Action Shorts, Four Feature Films, and One Serial of Amedee Van Beuren. Jeferson, NC: McFarland. ISBN 978-1-4766-8027-9
- Eyman, Scott (2010). Empire of Dreams: The Epic Life of Cecil B. DeMille. New York: Simon & Schuster. ISBN 978-0-7432-8955-9
- Fein, Seth (2000). "Transcultured Anticommunism: Cold War Hollywood in Postwar Mexico", in Visible Nations: Latin American Cinema and Video, ed. Chon A. Noriega, pp. 82–111. Minneapolis: University of Minnesota Press. ISBN 0-8166-3347-9
- Finler, Joel W. (2003). The Hollywood Story, 3d ed. London: Wallflower. ISBN 1-903364-66-3
- Fong-Torres, Ben (2001). The Hits Just Keep on Coming: The History of Top 40 Radio. Milwaukee: Hal Leonard. ISBN 0-87930-664-5
- Friedrich, Otto (1997 [1986]). City of Nets: A Portrait of Hollywood in the 1940s. Berkeley and Los Angeles: University of California Press. ISBN 0-520-20949-4
- Gabler, Neal (2006). Walt Disney: The Triumph of the American Imagination. New York: Alfred A. Knopf. ISBN 0-679-43822-X
- Glick, Mark A., Lara A. Reymann, and Richard Hoffman (2003). Intellectual Property Damages: Guidelines and Analysis. Hoboken, NJ: John Wiley & Sons. ISBN 0-471-23719-1
- Gomery, Douglas (1985). "The Coming of Sound: Technological Change in the American Film Industry", in Technology and Culture—The Film Reader, ed. Andrew Utterson, pp. 53–67. Oxford and New York: Routledge/Taylor & Francis, 2005. ISBN 0-415-31984-6
- Gomery, Douglas (2005). The Hollywood Studio System: A History. London: BFI. ISBN 978-1844570232
- Goodwin, Doris Kearns (1987). The Fitzgeralds and the Kennedys. New York: Simon & Schuster. ISBN 0-312-06354-7
- Hanson, Patricia King, and Amy Dunkleberger, eds. (1999). American Film Institute Catalog of Motion Pictures Produced in the United States: Feature Films, 1941–1950. Berkeley, Los Angeles, and London: University of California Press. ISBN 0-520-21521-4
- Harvey, James (1998). Romantic Comedy in Hollywood, from Lubitsch to Sturges. New York: Da Capo. ISBN 0-306-80832-3
- Haupert, Michael John (2006). The Entertainment Industry. Westport, CT.: Greenwood. ISBN 0-313-32173-6
- Hilmes, Michelle (1990). Hollywood and Broadcasting: From Radio to Cable. Urbana and Chicago: University of Illinois Press. ISBN 0-252-01709-9
- Holt, Jennifer (2011). Empires of Entertainment: Media Industries and the Politics of Deregulation, 1980–1996. New Brunswick, NJ: Rutgers University Press. ISBN 978-0-8135-5052-7
- Howard, Herbert H. (1979). Multiple Ownership in Television Broadcasting: Historical Development and Selected Case Studies. New York: Arno. ISBN 0-405-11759-0
- Huettig, Mae D. (1944). Economic Control of the Motion Picture Industry, excerpted in The American Film Industry, ed. Tino Balio, pp. 285–310. Madison: University of Wisconsin Press. ISBN 0-299-09874-5
- Jacobs, Steven (2007). The Wrong House: The Architecture of Alfred Hitchcock. Rotterdam: 010 Publishers. ISBN 90-6450-637-X
- Jeff, Leonard J., and Jerold L. Simmons (2001). The Dame in the Kimono: Hollywood, Censorship, and the Production Code. Lexington: University Press of Kentucky. ISBN 0-8131-9011-8
- Jewell, Richard B., with Vernon Harbin (1982). The RKO Story. New York: Arlington House/Crown. ISBN 0-517-54656-6
- Jewell, Richard B. (2012). RKO Radio Pictures: A Titan Is Born. Berkeley and Los Angeles: University of California Press. ISBN 978-0-520-27178-4
- Jewell, Richard B. (2016). Slow Fade to Black: The Decline of RKO Radio Pictures. Berkeley and Los Angeles: University of California Press. ISBN 978-0-520-28966-6
- Kear, Lynn, with James King (2009). Evelyn Brent: The Life and Films of Hollywood's Lady Crook. Jefferson, NC: McFarland. ISBN 0-7864-4363-4
- Keyes, Cheryl L. (2004). Rap Music and Street Consciousness. Urbana and Chicago: University of Illinois Press. ISBN 0-252-07201-4
- King, Emily (2003). Movie Poster. London: Octopus. ISBN 1-84000-653-6
- Korwar, Arati R. (2013 [1998]) "Hollywood/Radio Controversy of 1932", in History of the Mass Media in the United States: An Encyclopedia, ed. Margaret A. Blanchard, pp. 256–57. ISBN 1-57958-012-2
- Koszarski, Richard (2008). Hollywood on the Hudson: Film and Television in New York from Griffith to Sarnoff. New Brunswick, NJ: Rutgers University Press. ISBN 0-8135-4293-6
- Koszarski, Richard (2021). "Keep 'Em in the East": Kazan, Kubrick, and the Postwar New York Film Renaissance. New York: Columbia University Press. ISBN 978-0231200981
- Kroessler, Jeffrey A. (2002). New York Year by Year: A Chronology of the Great Metropolis. New York: NYU Press. ISBN 0-8147-4751-5
- Langdon-Teclaw, Jennifer (2007). "The Progressive Producer in the Studio System: Adrian Scott at RKO, 1943–1947", in "Un-American" Hollywood: Politics and Film in the Blacklist Era, ed. Frank Krutnik, Steve Neale, Brian Neve, and Peter Stanfield, pp. 152–68. New Brunswick, NJ, and London: Rutgers University Press. ISBN 0-8135-4198-0
- Lasky, Betty (1989). RKO: The Biggest Little Major of Them All. Santa Monica, CA: Roundtable. ISBN 0-915677-41-5
- Leff, Leonard J. (1999 [1987]). Hitchcock and Selznick: The Rich and Strange Collaboration of Alfred Hitchcock and David O. Selznick in Hollywood. Berkeley, Los Angeles, and London: University of California Press. ISBN 0-520-21781-0
- McBride, Joseph (2006). What Ever Happened to Orson Welles? A Portrait of an Independent Career. Lexington: University Press of Kentucky. ISBN 0-8131-2410-7
- McCann, Graham (1998). Cary Grant: A Class Apart. New York: Columbia University Press. ISBN 0-231-10885-0
- Moody's Manual of Investments: American and Foreign—Volume 2, Industrial Securities (1935). New York: Moody's Investors Service.
- Moody's Manual of Investments: American and Foreign—Volume 2, Industrial Securities (1941). New York: Moody's Investors Service.
- Morton, Ray (2005). King Kong: The History of a Movie Icon from Fay Wray to Peter Jackson. New York: Applause. ISBN 1-55783-669-8
- Mueller, John (1986). Astaire Dancing: The Musical Films. London: Hamish Hamilton. ISBN 0-241-11749-6
- Muller, Eddie (1998). Dark City: The Lost World of Film Noir. New York: St. Martin's. ISBN 0-312-18076-4
- Naremore, James (1989). The Magic World of Orson Welles, rev. ed. Dallas: Southern Methodist University Press. ISBN 0-87074-299-X
- Nasaw, David (2012). The Patriarch: The Remarkable Life and Turbulent Times of Joseph P. Kennedy. New York: Penguin Press. ISBN 978-1-59420-376-3
- Nye, David E. (1992). Electrifying America: Social Meanings of a New Technology, 1880–1940. Cambridge, MA: MIT Press. ISBN 0-262-64030-9
- O'Neill, Dennis J. (1966). A Whale of a Territory: The Story of Bill O'Neil. New York: McGraw Hill.
- Pierce, David (2007). "Forgotten Faces: Why Some of Our Cinema Heritage Is Part of the Public Domain", Film History: An International Journal 19, no. 2 (June). doi:10.2979/FIL.2007.19.2.125 JSTOR 25165419
- Pierson, John (1997). Spike, Mike, Slackers & Dykes: A Guided Tour Across a Decade of American Independent Cinema. New York: Miramax Books/Hyperion. ISBN 0-7868-8222-0
- Pitts, Michael R. (2015). RKO Radio Pictures Horror, Science Fiction and Fantasy Films, 1929–1956. Jefferson, NC: McFarland. ISBN 978-0-7864-6047-2
- Porst, Jennifer (2015). "The Preservation of Competition: Hollywood and Antitrust Law", in Hollywood and the Law, ed. Paul McDonald, Emily Carman, Eric Hoyt, and Philip Drake, pp. 103–29. London: BFI/Palgrave. ISBN 978-1-84457-477-3
- Regev, Ronny (2018). Working in Hollywood: How the Studio System Turned Creativity into Labor. Chapel Hill: University of North Carolina Press. ISBN 9781469636504
- Rode, Alan K. (2007). Charles McGraw: Biography of a Film Noir Tough Guy. Jefferson, NC: McFarland. ISBN 0-7864-3167-9
- Russell, James, and Jim Whalley (2018). Hollywood and the Baby Boom: A Social History. New York and London: Bloomsbury Academic. ISBN 978-1-5013-3149-7
- Schatz, Thomas (1998 [1989]). The Genius of the System: Hollywood Filmmaking in the Studio Era. London: Faber and Faber. ISBN 0-571-19596-2
- Schatz, Thomas (1999 [1997]). Boom and Bust: American Cinema in the 1940s. Berkeley, Los Angeles, and London: University of California Press. ISBN 0-520-22130-3
- Schwartz, Ronald (2005). Neo-Noir: The New Film Noir Style from Psycho to Collateral. Lanham, MD: Rowman & Littlefield/Scarecrow. ISBN 0-8108-5676-X
- Segrave, Kerry (1999). Movies at Home: How Hollywood Came to Television. Jefferson, NC: McFarland. ISBN 0-7864-0654-2
- Senn, Bryan (1996). Golden Horrors: An Illustrated Critical Filmography of Terror Cinema, 1931–1939. Jefferson, NC: McFarland. ISBN 0-7864-0175-3
- Senn, Bryan (2018). Drums o' Terror: Voodoo in the Cinema. Albany, GA: BearManor Media. ISBN 978-1-887664-18-9
- Server, Lee (2002). Robert Mitchum: "Baby, I Don't Care". New York: St. Martin's. ISBN 0-312-26206-X
- Shull, Michael S., and David Edward Wilt (1996). Hollywood War Films, 1937–1945: An Exhaustive Filmography of American Feature-Length Motion Pictures Relating to World War II. Jefferson, NC: McFarland. ISBN 978-0-7864-2854-0
- Sikov, Ed (1996). Laughing Hysterically: American Screen Comedy of the 1950s. New York: Columbia University Press. ISBN 0-231-07983-4
- Slide, Anthony (1998). The New Historical Dictionary of the American Film Industry. Abingdon and New York: Routledge. ISBN 978-1-579-58056-8
- Smith, Dave (1996). Disney A to Z: The Official Encyclopedia. New York: Hyperion. ISBN 0-7868-6223-8
- Spicer, Andrew (2014 [2002]). Film Noir. Abingdon and New York: Routledge. ISBN 978-0-582-43712-1
- Spoto, Donald (1984 [1983]). The Dark Side of Genius: The Life of Alfred Hitchcock. New York: Ballantine. ISBN 0-345-31462-X
- Stephens, Michael L. (1995). Film Noir: A Comprehensive, Illustrated Reference to Movies, Terms, and Persons. Jefferson, NC: McFarland. ISBN 0-89950-802-2
- Terrace, Vincent (1999). Radio Programs, 1924–1984: A Catalog of More Than 1800 Shows. Jefferson, NC: McFarland. ISBN 978-0-7864-4513-4
- Thomson, David (1997 [1996]). Rosebud: The Story of Orson Welles. New York: Vintage. ISBN 0-679-77283-9
- Uytdewilligen, Ryan (2021). Killing John Wayne: The Making of the Conqueror. Lanham, MD: Globe Pequot/Rowman & Littlefield. ISBN 978-1-4930-5847-1
- Ward, Richard Lewis (2016). When the Cock Crows: A History of the Pathé Exchange. Carbondale: Southern Illinois University Press. ISBN 978-0-8093-3496-4
- Wegele, Peter (2014). Max Steiner: Composing, Casablanca, and the Golden Age of Film Music. Lanham, MD: Rowman & Littlefield. ISBN 978-1-4422-3113-9
