= Bigelow v. RKO Radio Pictures, Inc. =

- Supreme Court of the United States

Argued February 7, 1946 Decided February 25, 1946
- Full case name: Bigelow v. RKO Radio Pictures, Inc.
- Citations: 327 U.S. 251 (more) 66 S. Ct. 574; 90 L. Ed. 652

Case history
- Subsequent: Rehearing denied, 327 U.S. 817 (1946).

Holding
- A damage award does not need to be mathematically precise, but it must be a just and reasonable estimate based on the evidence presented, and not based on speculation. Can use yardstick or before & after, but must be careful to use comparable data.

Court membership
- Chief Justice Harlan F. Stone Associate Justices Hugo Black · Stanley F. Reed; Felix Frankfurter · William O. Douglas; Frank Murphy · Robert H. Jackson; Wiley B. Rutledge · Harold H. Burton

Case opinions
- Majority: Stone
- Dissent: Frankfurter
- Jackson took no part in the consideration or decision of the case.

Laws applied
- Sherman Act, 15 U.S.C. §§ 1, 2 and 7; Clayton Act, §§ 4 and 16

Bigelow v. RKO Radio Pictures, Inc., 327 U.S. 251 (1946), was a decision by the United States Supreme Court allowing an action to recover compensatory damages under the antitrust statutes. The jury had returned a verdict for $120,000 in petitioner's favor, covering a five-year period where plaintiff suffered due to respondents' antitrust conspiracy. The trial court, sitting in the Northern District of Illinois, gave judgment for treble damages, as prescribed by § 4 of the Clayton Act. The 7th Circuit reversed on the sole ground that the evidence of damage was not sufficient for submission to the jury, and directed the entry of judgment for respondents non obstante veredicto (notwithstanding the verdict). The Supreme Court granted certiorari to determine whether the evidence of damage was sufficient to support the verdict. Respondents argued that any measure of damages would be too speculative and uncertain to afford an accurate measure of the amount of the damage. The Supreme Court disagreed, not wanting to let the respondent defeat a remedy because its antitrust violation was so effective and complete. The Court held that the jury could return a verdict for the plaintiffs, even though damages could not be measured with the exactness which would otherwise have been possible, so long as the jury made a "just and reasonable estimate of the damage based on relevant data". The judgment of the district court was affirmed and the judgment of the court of appeals was reversed.

== Facts ==
Petitioners, owners of the Jackson Park motion picture theatre in Chicago, alleged that respondents, some of whom, like RKO Pictures, were distributors of films, and some of whom owned or controlled theatres in Chicago, entered into a conspiracy which continued from some time before November 1936 to the date the suit was brought, July 28, 1942. During the conspiracy, films were distributed among cinemas in Chicago in such a manner that theatres owned by some of the conspirators were able to show movies before independent theater operators. Independent exhibitors were not able to show new movies until the conspirators had finished with a "first run".

The first question was whether there was an unlawful conspiracy, and the second question was how to measure the damages for any loss, given the difficulty of knowing how many people might have attended different films.

== Judgment ==
The Supreme Court found that it was "indisputable that the jury could have found that ... a first run theater possessed competitive advantages over later run theaters" and that this discriminatory release was "damaging to petitioners". The problem, however, was the uncertainty in determining to what amount those damages should total. The petitioners submitted two methodologies for calculating damages. The first was the yardstick method, which compared the earnings from petitioner's theater, Jackson Park, during the conspiracy to the earnings of its competitor, the Maryland Theater. The two theaters were comparable in size, although the Jackson Park theater was "superior in location, equipment, and attractiveness to patrons." The Maryland Theater, however, was owned by Paramount Pictures, and benefited from the conspiracy. The evidence showed that during the five-year period, Maryland's profit exceeded petitioner's like profit by $115,982.34.

The second measure was the before & after method. Here, the Court looked to the years 1933–1937, where the petitioner had successfully showed at least some first run movies, to the five-year period where the conspiracy was established to have happened, and petitioner was completely shut out of first run movies despite its best efforts. This comparison showed a falling off of petitioners' profits during the five-year period aggregating $125,659.00.

The 7th Circuit concluded that the jury had adopted the before & after method, but that this proof did not furnish a proper measure of damage for the reason that it could not be proved what petitioner's earnings would have been in the absence of the illegal distribution of films. The Supreme Court reversed, holding that a damage award does not need to be mathematically precise, but it must be a just and reasonable estimate based on the evidence presented, and not based on speculation. Petitioners are able to submit yardstick or before & after estimates, but they must be careful to use comparable data.

== See also ==
- United States antitrust law
- United States v. Paramount Pictures, Inc., 334 U.S. 131 (1948), deciding the fate of movie studios owning their own theatres and holding exclusivity rights on which theatres would show their films.
- List of United States Supreme Court cases, volume 327
