= List of law firms in Hong Kong by size =

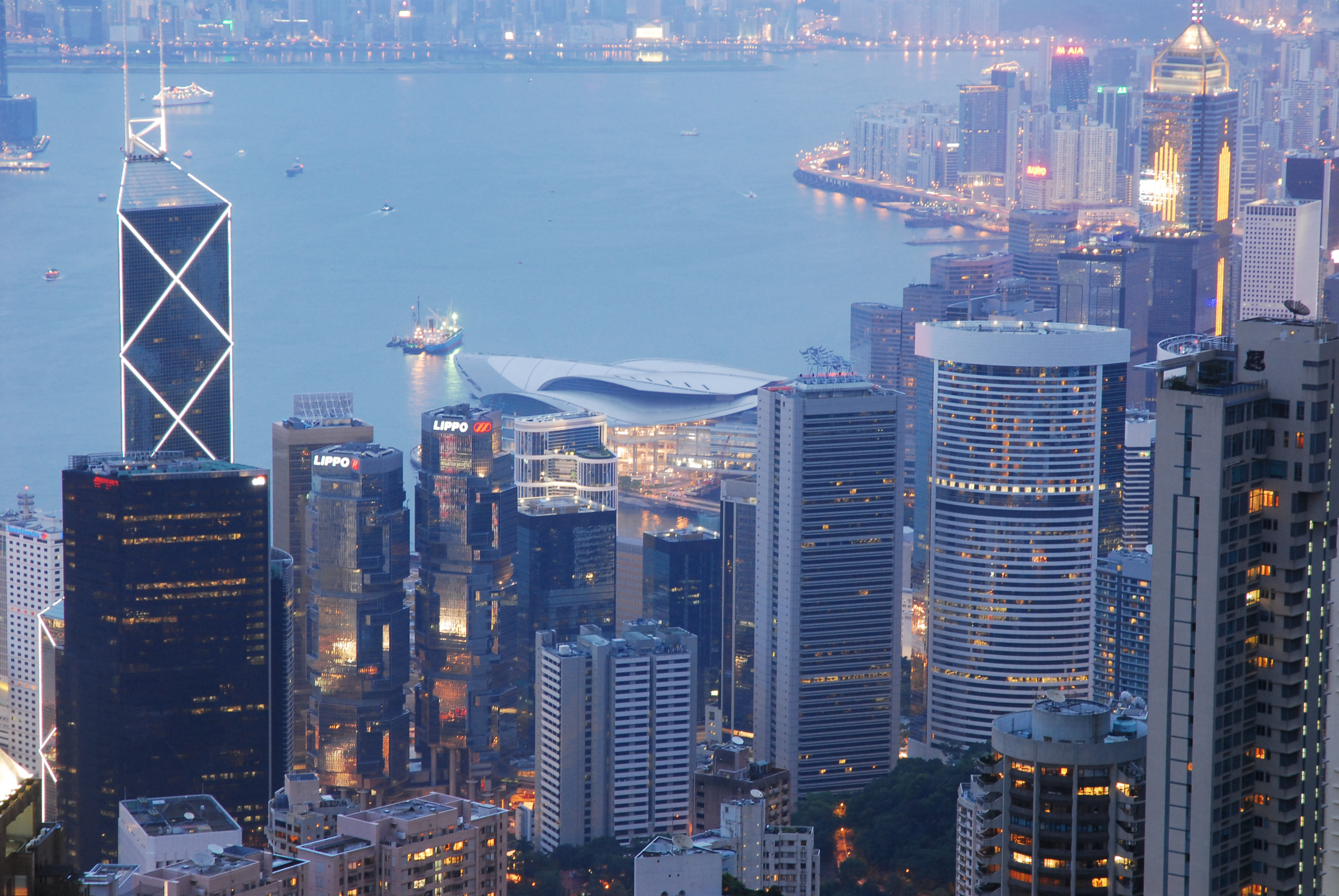
Central, Hong Kong, where most prestigious law firms are located.

== Ranking by Scale ==
This article contains a list of the 50 largest domestic and international law firms which have at least one office situated in Hong Kong. There are approximately 2875 qualified lawyers, comprising 766 partners and 1848 associates, working across these top 30 domestic and international law firms in Hong Kong. Note that below is a ranking of law firms in Hong Kong by number of registered lawyers but not revenue.

Rank	Name	Headquarter(s)	Number of Partners	Number of Consultants & Associates	Number of Registered Foreign Lawyers	Number of Registered Lawyers	Remarks
1	King & Wood Mallesons	Hong Kong; China; Australia	33	137	61	231	International
2	Deacons	Hong Kong	53	129	14	196	Domestic
3	Linklaters	United Kingdom	29	89	50	168	Magic Circle
4	Baker McKenzie	United States	43	92	33	168	International
5	Clifford Chance	United Kingdom	37	90	35	162	Magic Circle
6	Johnson Stokes & Master	Hong Kong	45	77	3	125	Domestic
7	A&O Shearman	United Kingdom	24	69	17	110	Magic Circle
8	DLA Piper	United Kingdom; United States	28	54	16	98	International
9	Freshfields Bruckhaus Deringer	United Kingdom	25	46	24	95	Magic Circle
10	Herbert Smith Freehills Kramer	United Kingdom; Australia; United States	18	55	17	90	Silver Circle
11	Fangda Partners	China	17	43	30	90	Multinational
12	Latham & Watkins	United States	16	39	32	87	U.S. Vault V-5
13	Zhong Lun	China	27	33	26	86	Multinational
14	Kirkland & Ellis	United States	32	16	37	85	U.S. Vault V-10
15	Sidley Austin	United States	14	39	31	84	U.S. White Shoe
16	Li & Partners	Hong Kong	9	56	14	79	Domestic
17	Woo, Kwan, Lee & Lo	Hong Kong	26	50	1	77	Domestic
18	Howse Williams	Hong Kong; China	31	43	1	75	Domestic
19	Reed Smith Richards Butler	United States	24	42	7	73	International
20	Skadden, Arps, Slate, Meagher & Flom	United States	9	33	26	68	U.S. White Shoe; U.S. Vault V-5
21	DeHeng Law Offices	China	18	26	21	65	Multinational
22	KB Chau & Co	Hong Kong	13	47	3	63	Domestic
23	Slaughter & May	United Kingdom	12	39	12	63	Magic Circle
24	Stephenson Harwood	United Kingdom	23	33	6	62	International
25	Ashurst	United Kingdom	16	36	9	61	Silver Circle
26	Holman Fenwick Willan	United Kingdom	18	35	5	58	International
27	Jun He Law Offices	China	16	20	22	58	Multinational
28	Davis Polk & Wardwell	United States	5	31	19	55	U.S. White Shoe; U.S. Vault V-10
29	PC Woo & Co	Hong Kong	12	39	3	54	Domestic
30	White & Case	United States	18	20	15	53	International
31	Eversheds Sutherland	United Kingdom	12	33	7	52	International
32	Simpson Thacher & Bartlett	United States	14	20	17	51	International
33	Bird & Bird	United Kingdom	17	25	9	51	International
34	Norton Rose Fulbright	United Kingdom; United States	16	29	6	51	International
35	Gallant	Hong Kong	15	34	1	50	Domestic
36	Oldham, Li & Nie	Hong Kong; China	13	30	6	49	Domestic
37	Stevenson, Wong & Co	Hong Kong	15	31	2	48	Domestic
38	CMS Hong Kong LLP	Hong KongUnited Kingdom; Germany	13	26	9	48	International
39	Hogan Lovells	United Kingdom; United States	14	29	4	47	International
40	Gibson, Dunn & Crutcher	United States	9	25	13	46	International
41	Hastings & Co	Hong Kong	13	31	1	45	Domestic
42	Haldanes	Hong Kong	19	25	0	44	Domestic
43	So, Lung & Associates, Solicitors	Hong Kong	5	25	14	44	Domestic
44	Simmons & Simmons	United Kingdom	14	23	6	43	International
45	ONC Lawyers	Hong Kong	16	18	8	42	Domestic
46	Iu, Lai & Li	Hong Kong	14	26	2	42	Domestic
47	Kennedys	United Kingdom	13	28	2	42	International
48	Tanner De Witt	Hong Kong	17	23	1	41	Domestic
49	MinterEllison	Australia	20	20	0	40	International
50	Dentons	China; United States	11	25	4	40	Multinational

== See also ==
- Lawyers in Singapore
- List of largest law firms by revenue
