= Seven Sisters (law firms) =

Canadian group of large law firms

The Seven Sisters refers to a historical collection of seven law firms with offices across Canada, the majority of which have head offices in Toronto, Ontario.

== Membership ==
In alphabetical order, the historical Seven Sisters included: Blakes, Davies, Goodmans, McCarthy, Osler, Stikeman, and Torys.

== History ==
The term "Seven Sisters" was originally coined by John Alexander Black, founder of Lexpert (previously owned by Thomson Reuters and now owned by Key Media). At the time, the Seven Sisters dominated the Canadian M&A legal advisory rankings. However, by 2006, Black stated "the moniker may have run its course and that some people argue the Seven have shrunk to two or possibly three." Later that year, The Globe & Mail reported the Seven Sisters term was no longer valid, explaining that "as the Canadian pool of major companies boils down to a thin concentrate, the upper legal tier has also shrunk." It noted that "most observers agree the reigning top players are McCarthy Tétrault, Stikeman Elliott, Osler, Hoskin & Harcourt and Blake, Cassels & Graydon." In 2014, the Financial Post reported "the Chambers Global rankings for Canadian law firms confirm that it's time to retire the notion that "Seven Sisters" dominate Canadian law firms." As of 2024, only five of the original seven have become national law firms in Canada and feature in The American Lawyer global rankings – the aforementioned four plus Torys LLP.

In 2015, The Globe and Mail reported that the corporate legal market had changed markedly from the early 2000s: "Elite U.S. legal shops blanket the top 25 firms for M&A, taking 13 of the top spots on the chart." According to most recent M&A league tables from LSE Group Data & Analytics (formerly Thomson Reuters Financial), in 2024, ten of the top 25 firms in the Canadian market were American with another six from Britain, signalling the integration of Canada into the larger North American and global legal services market. The 'Club of Nine' was a similar term used in London, until it was replaced by the Magic Circle, which itself has been deprecated as U.S. law firms entered the European market.

=== From Single-office Corporate Boutiques to National Champions ===
Since the end of the Cold War, the Canadian corporate legal market has undergone significant consolidation and reorganisation in order to adapt to Canada's shrinking business community, the integration of Canada into the wider North American economy, and the liberalisation of services markets worldwide. The decision by the Supreme Court of Canada in Black v Law Society of Alberta and the concomitant 1989-90 merger of Toronto's McCarthy & McCarthy with Montreal's Clarkson Tetrault, Calgary's Black & Company, and Vancouver's Shrum Liddle & Hebenton served as a catalyst for the Canadian legal sector's "big bang." Thus far, Canadian partnerships had been limited in their ability to practice law outside their home provinces; the Sisters, for the most part, had operated as single-office corporate boutiques.

Shortly thereafter, a subclass of the Seven Sisters decided to expand nationally by greenfielding offices in the 1990s (i.e. Osler and Blakes from Toronto, Stikeman Elliott from Montreal, and Bennett Jones from Calgary), setting off a corresponding wave of combinations among regional law firms. These amalgamations were concentrated about a group of national mergers at the turn of the millennium (i.e. Fasken Martineau DuMoulin, Borden Ladner Gervais, and Gowling LaFleur Henderson) and then a succession of international mergers after the 2008 financial crisis (i.e. Ogilvy Renault and Mcleod Dixon with Norton Rose Fulbright and Fraser Milner Casgrain with Dentons), creating a new class of well-resourced competitors to the Sisters. During this period of upheaval a number of major law firms also failed, including Toronto's Goodman and Carr (2007), Montreal's Desjardins Ducharme (2007) which had an "exclusive and strategic partnership with Torys" (Torys would open a Montreal office in 2013), and most notably Heenan Blaikie (2014).

Much of this activity has occurred due to the deregulation of trade in inter-provincial legal services in 1989, the integration of capital markets between and the cross-listing of companies on the Toronto and New York bourses following the implementation of CUSFTA (later NAFTA, and now CUSMA) in 1989, and the emergence of Toronto as a leading Canadian and North American financial centre following the merger of the Montreal, Vancouver and Alberta stock exchanges into the Toronto Stock Exchange (now, TMX Group) from 1999 to 2001.

=== Mergers and Domestic Alliances ===
Amidst all of these structural changes in the market, only three of the Seven Sisters underwent mergers — the aforementioned McCarthy in 1989–90, Toronto's Davies Ward & Beck with Montreal's Phillips & Vineberg in 2000 and Toronto's Tory & Tory with New York's Haythe & Curley in 2000 — whilst the remainder decided to grow organically. Notably, Calgary's Bennett Jones abandoned three-way merger negotiations with Tory & Tory a month before the announcement of its merger deal with Haythe & Curley, deciding to go it alone.

Unique among the Seven Sisters, Goodmans reverted to the Sisters' single-office boutique model in 2015 when it spun off its Vancouver office — the Toronto firm originally known as Goodman & Goodman had previously been in "alliance" with the Montreal firm Phillips & Vineberg before the latter firm's merger with Davies Ward & Beck in 2000. In the mid-1990s, Toronto's Osler ended its own short-lived "association" with Montreal's Ogilvy, which had been "the largest law firm in the British Commonwealth," culminating in each firm entering the other's home market.

=== International Alliances ===
In 2011, the Sisters were presented with a unique opportunity to "go global" amidst talk of creating a pan-English financial union to rival the Americans. Subsequent to the 2007 merger of the New York Stock Exchange (NYSE) with Euronext — itself a combination of continental Europe's leading bourses — the Toronto Stock Exchange (TMX Group) and the London Stock Exchange (LSE Group) proposed their own merger in February 2011. The combined entity, to be known as LTMX Group, would have created a trans-Atlantic bourse with the scale and scope to compete globally, particularly in the mining and energy sectors.

At the time, The Globe and Mail reported that TMX Group was being advised by Torys and Magic Circle law firm Allen & Overy, while LSE Group was being counselled by Osler and London's Freshfields. The LTMX integration offered Toronto and London's leading capital markets' advisors — namely the Seven Sisters and the Magic Circle — with their own opportunities to merge and form trans-Atlantic champions better able to compete with New York's legal powerhouses.

While the LSE-TMX merger was ultimately rejected by shareholders in June 2011, Lexpert noted that when Torys "entered the Calgary market with its own greenfield in March 2011, the street cast the deal as the penultimate step in making itself attractive for a global suitor (Allen & Overy LLP, given the two firms' past co-mandates, was the favourite)," with the industry publication emphasising that "if a Canadian law firm wants to be part of an international law firm, they have to be in Calgary."

In 2013, The Lawyer reported that Magic Circle firm Linklaters would not expand its "alliance" to Canada through an association with its long-time Canadian referral partner, Blakes. Linklaters had entered the Australian market on 1 May 2012 through an "alliance" with Allens Arthur Robinson, and the continental European market at the turn of the millennium via an "alliance" of local firms with which it eventually merged. As of 2025, Blakes maintains strong relations with both Linklaters and Allens.

The Seven Sisters have not exhibited the same degree of growth and global diversification that the Magic Circle have since the 2011 LSE-TMX proposal. According to The American Lawyer, "Toronto has the fifth largest legal market on the continent, valued at almost $22 billion, after New York, Washington, D.C., L.A., and Chicago" making it an attractive location for in-bound legal services investment and a strong home base for out-bound expansion.

By comparison, in the decade since the proposed Anglo-Canadian alliance collapsed, the Magic Circle have continued to seek opportunities across the Atlantic — favouring the U.S. over its northern neighbour. Freshfields managed to successfully enter the highly competitive U.S. corporate bar through greenfields, while Allen & Overy completed a precedent-setting, trans-Atlantic merger with New York-founded Shearman & Sterling on 1 May 2024. Linklaters — in alliance with Big Six Australian firm Allens — also noted that it was "open to mergers in its pursuit of U.S. growth." Another Magic Circle firm Clifford Chance had sealed its own U.S.-U.K. merger with New York's Rogers & Wells in 2000.

'Club of Nine' laggard Herbert Smith merged with New York-based Kramer Levin on 1 June 2025 following its combination with Big Six Australian law firm Freehills on 1 October 2012; it also worked on co-mandates with Stikeman Elliott. The American Lawyer noted that the merger may help Herbert Smith — historically known for government, privatisation, and litigation work — close the gap with its former 'Club of Nine' peers in the Magic Circle. 'Club of Nine' firm Lovells had merged with Washington-based Hogan & Hartson on 1 May 2010 to form Hogan Lovells; it has also had good relations with Davies in Canada. Nearly a decade after the combination, The American Lawyer noted that while the Hogan Lovells merger had "gone more smoothly than many expected, on some counts it has underdelivered," noting it had not significantly increased its ranking in either corporate league tables or turnover and profitability rankings.

Notably, 'Club of Nine' underperformer Norton Rose merged with leading Montreal- and Calgary-based firms Ogilvy Renault and Macleod Dixon in 2011 and 2012, respectively, before entering the U.S. market through mergers with Houston-based Fulbright & Jaworski and New York-based Chadbourne & Park in 2013 and 2017, respectively. It also added Vancouver's Bull Housser and Australia's Henry Davis York in 2017 to round out its pan-Commonwealth offerings, indicating that non-U.S. centric growth strategies have also had a certain degree of success should firms be willing to forgo the more profitable American market.

At the time of the A&O Shearman Sterling merger, both The Lawyer and The American Lawyer declared "the end of the Magic Circle era", as the corporate legal sector continued to globalise and trans-Atlantic economic relations deepened despite ongoing attempts to establish nationalist and protectionist regimes post-Brexit. As of mid-2025, Canada's Seven Sisters have yet to join the wave of pan-Commonwealth or trans-Atlantic mergers that have swept over the London-founded Magic Circle and the Big Six in Australia.

=== Foreign Competition ===
The Seven Sisters have also faced increasing competition from abroad, particularly from New York which has attracted an ever-growing share of the hemisphere's corporate legal work. Furthermore, some American law firms have established representative outposts practicing U.S. law in Toronto (i.e. Skadden Arps, Paul Weiss and A&O Shearman from New York), while others seeking to practice Canadian law have forgone mergers with local firms to greenfield into Canada (i.e. Baker McKenzie from Chicago, and more recently Mintz Levin from Boston and Cozen O'Connor from Philadelphia).

== Lexpert - Canada's Largest Law Firms ==
Lexpert publishes an annual ranking of law firms by Canadian legal headcount. Many of the law firms included in the list also have offices practicing non-Canadian law that are not included in the below chart (i.e. Torys in New York, Fasken in Johannesburg, and Gowling in London).

Rank	Name	Canadian Headcount	Toronto	Ottawa	Montréal	Vancouver	Calgary	Edmonton	Other Cities
1	Fasken	902	299	33	294	155	57	-	7 Surrey, BC; 58 Quebec, QC
2	Gowling WLG	793	203	213	105	82	91	-	39 Hamilton, ON; 60 Waterloo, ON
3	BLG	780	293	83	150	140	114	-	-
4	McCarthy	744	368	-	175	101	64	-	36 Quebec, QC
5	Blakes	669	322	6	100	124	117	-	3 New York, NY; 4 London, UK
6	Norton Rose	629	150	47	160	92	113	-	67 Quebec, QC
7	Dentons	576	189	44	99	74	92	78	-
8	Osler	529	309	13	82	48	77	-	4 New York, NY
9	Stikeman	523	238	6	161	53	65	-	-
10	Miller Thomson	499	169	-	77	55	42	47	25 London, ON; 32 Vaughan, ON; 26 Waterloo, ON; 16 Regina, SK; 10 Saskatoon, SK
11	Bennett Jones	470	201	2	15	54	156	42	2 New York, NY
12	Torys	352	275	-	16	-	41	-	20 Halifax, NS

== The American Lawyer Global 200 - Canadian Law Ranking ==
The 2024 edition of The American Lawyer's ranking of global law firms by revenue included the top dozen law firms in Lexpert's headcount ranking for the first time. The American Lawyer ranking also includes a number of international law firms with offices practicing Canadian law (i.e. DLA, Baker McKenzie, Mintz Levin, and Cozen O'Connor).

Canada Rank	Global Rank	Name	Revenue (US$)	Revenue per Lawyer (RPL, US$)	Total Lawyers	Profit per Equity Partner (PEP, US$)	Total Equity Partners	Head Office & Country	Number of offices	Year established
N/A	3	DLA	3,829,531,000	840,000	4,561	3,122,000	334	London, UK	90	2005 international merger
N/A	4	Baker McKenzie	3,286,791,000	721,000	4,558	1,981,000	605	Chicago, IL	77	1949
N/A	13	Dentons	2,720,000,000	457,000	5,946	403,000	2,025	London, UK	160	2012 international merger
N/A	20	Norton Rose	2,261,192,000	734,000	3,079	1,400,000	506	London, UK	50	2010-2013 international merger
N/A	88	Gowling WLG	713,683,000	565,000	1,263	704,000	396	Ottawa, ON and Toronto, ON & London, UK	20	2016 international merger
1	90	Blakes	692,794,000	994,000	697	986,000	274	Toronto, ON	7	1856
N/A	95	Cozen O'Connor	653,043,000	871,000	750	1,139,000	197	Philadelphia, PA	32	1970
N/A	98	Mintz Levin	645,200,000	1,240,000	520	2,103,000	93	Boston, MA	8	1933
2	99	McCarthy	635,000,000	844,000	752	1,418,000	170	Toronto, ON	7	1855
3	111	Fasken	579,938,000	647,000	897	N/A	N/A	Toronto, ON	10	2000 merger
4	130	Osler	479,904,000	882,000	544	N/A	N/A	Toronto, ON	6	1862
5	138	BLG	443,658,000	553,000	803	N/A	N/A	Toronto, ON	5	2000 merger
6	142	Bennett Jones	425,000,000	895,000	475	N/A	N/A	Calgary, AB and Toronto, ON	7	1922
7	161	Stikeman	368,756,000	713,000	517	N/A	N/A	Montreal, QC and Toronto, ON	8	1952
8	192	Torys	294,403,000	773,000	381	N/A	N/A	Toronto, ON	4	1941
9	199	Miller Thomson	282,274,000	563,000	501	N/A	N/A	Toronto, ON	11	1957

== See also ==
- Magic Circle (law)
- Silver Circle (law)
- White shoe firm
- Big Six law firms
- Red Circle (law)
- Big Four law firms (Japan)
- Histoire des cabinets d'avocats au Canada
