= Big Six (law firms) =

Group of largest Australian law firms

The Big Six is a term that has traditionally referred to the six largest Australian law firms, as assessed by revenue and lawyer head count. From the mid-1980s, the phrase was in regular use to distinguish the largest Australian firms, collectively, from their smaller competitors. While informal, it was a widely used descriptor, appearing in news items, industry commentary and scholarly articles.

In 2012, four of the Big Six firms merged or formed association relationships with firms from other countries. As the Australian legal scene has evolved since these changes, the term Big Six has become less applicable, although it is still in use in some media discussion. Other terms, such as "top-tier law firm" are sometimes used in media coverage when the largest law firms in Australia, commonly a set of eight such firms, (Note: The law firms frequently designated as "top tier", or by similar terms such as the Big 8, are: Allens; Ashurst; Clayton Utz; Corrs Chambers Westgarth; Gilbert + Tobin; Herbert Smith Freehills; King & Wood Mallesons; MinterEllison) are mentioned. Other labels used to refer to the largest, or most lucrative, law firms operating in Australia have been suggested, such as "global elite law firms" or "international business law firms". The term "Big 8" has also made an appearance in business news coverage.

== History ==
Until 1981, legal practices in Australia were restricted to operation within one state; they relied on affiliation between interstate practices to attend to legal matters outside their own state. Following implementation of the Commonwealth Companies Act 1981 and its nationally adopted "cooperative" ownership regulations, Australian law firms were permitted to operate nationwide. In the transition from regional law firms to fully integrated, national partnership practices, mergers of large state-based firms, reduced the number of very large law practices in Australia to six, while significantly increasing the size of the largest Australian firms. It was in this context that the term came into general usage.

=== The six firms ===
The following firms were generally seen as composing the Big Six (listed alphabetically):

- Allens Arthur Robinson (now Allens, which operates in association with Linklaters LLP)
- Blake Dawson (now Ashurst Australia, part of British-based multinational firm Ashurst LLP)
- Clayton Utz
- Freehills (now part of Herbert Smith Freehills Kramer)
- Mallesons Stephen Jaques (now Mallesons, formerly part of King & Wood Mallesons)
- MinterEllison

In 2012, three of these firms merged with, and one other began operating in association with, firms from other countries: United Kingdom firms in three cases, China in one.

Following these major changes in the Australian legal scene, the Big Six term is sometimes viewed as less applicable; top-tier law firms is one descriptor used in its place on occasion, for the largest, most profitable, law firms in Australia.

=== Historical size and rankings ===
The majority of the six firms were among the 100 largest law firms globally. In terms of revenue these were:

Firm	2010 rank	2011 rank	2012 rank
MinterEllison	83	67	82
Mallesons Stephen Jaques	87	75	70
Allens Arthur Robinson	90	73	72
Freehills	91	70	58
Clayton Utz	97	83	77

Several of these predecessor firms have also been leading firms in the Asia-Pacific region generally. In 2007, Allens Arthur Robinson, Clayton Utz, Freehills, and Mallesons Stephen Jaques were the top five firms in the Asia Pacific region in mergers and acquisitions transactions, ranking above Magic Circle firm Linklaters.

The Business Review Weekly (BRW) listed these firms in its "Top 500 Private Companies" tables based on gross income: In the 2011−2012 Australian financial year, the law firms with the highest revenue were as follows:

Rank	Firm	Revenue
1	Freehills	$565,000,000
2	Clayton Utz	$455,400,000
3	Allens	$440,000,000
4	King & Wood Mallesons	$424,000,000
5	MinterEllison	$419,203,000
6	Ashurst Australia	$398,000,000

Until its closure, BRW awarded its Client Choice Awards in the "Best law firm, revenue over $200 million" category to a law firm judged to deliver the best client service. In 2012 that firm was King & Wood Mallesons.

The Australian Financial Review took over as the media partner for the Client Choice Awards after it acquired BRW.

In 2013 the finalists for the award were (listed alphabetically):

- Ashurst Australia
- Herbert Smith Freehills
- King & Wood Mallesons
- Norton Rose

== Continued globalisation ==
From 1 March 2012, Blake Dawson traded as Ashurst Australia until a full financial merger with Ashurst LLP on 1 November 2013; the full merger took place six months ahead of schedule.

Mallesons Stephen Jaques operates as King & Wood Mallesons, after a merger and reorganisation with Chinese firm King & Wood, which has resulted in a Swiss association-structured association among what was the Australian and UK practice of Mallesons Stephen Jaques, a fully merged, combined Hong Kong practice, and a fully merged, combined mainland China practice consisting mainly of the existing King & Wood practice. In 2013, King & Wood Mallesons further merged with London-headquartered Silver Circle law firm SJ Berwin, although that practice ceased operations in 2017.

Allens Arthur Robinson changed its name to Allens on 1 May 2012, and began to operate in association with the Magic Circle firm Linklaters. The association arrangements will see the firms operate with joint ventures in some parts of Asia, Allens practices merging into Linklaters practices in other parts, and the two firms operating jointly on certain matters.

Freehills merged with London-headquartered Silver Circle law firm Herbert Smith, effective from 1 October 2012. The full financial merger created a single, global firm called Herbert Smith Freehills.

== Comparable terms in United Kingdom ==
The Magic Circle is an informal term for UK-headquartered law firms with the largest revenues, the most international work and which consistently outperform the rest of the UK market on profitability. The Silver Circle is an informal term for perceived elite corporate law firms headquartered in the United Kingdom that are the main competitors for the magic circle.

The London-headquartered Magic Circle firms with operations in Australia, Clifford Chance and Allen & Overy, are not considered to be part of the same group as the Australian top tier law firms.

Following the mergers and association arrangements announced in 2012 and 2013, Freehills and Blake Dawson have become parts of UK-headquartered Silver Circle firms, while Allens is now in an association arrangement with a Magic Circle law firm.

== See also ==
- Big Five law firms, informal term for South Africa's prominent law firms
- Big Four law firms, informal term for leading law firms in Japan
- Red Circle, term for major law firms in China, coined in 2014 by The Lawyer magazine
- Seven Sisters, informal term for leading law firms in Canada
- White-shoe firm, informal term for major professional services firms, including law firms
  - History of the American legal profession § White shoe firms and Emergence of Big Law
