= Lawyers in Singapore =

Lawyers in Singapore are part of a fused profession, meaning that they may act as both a solicitor and as an advocate, although lawyers usually specialise in litigation, conveyancing or corporate law.

== Demographics ==
In 2023, there were a total of 6,512 practising lawyers in Singapore, of whom 3,677 were male and 2,835 were female.

Year	Number of practising lawyers	Remarks
2002	4000	
2007	4200	
2012	5200	
2019	5920	
2020	5955	
2021	6333	
2022	6237	
2023	6512	

=== Registered foreign lawyers ===
In July 2009, there were 95 foreign firms with offices in Singapore, and 840 foreign lawyers, up from 576 in 2000. Six international firms were given a licence to practice local corporate law for the first time in December 2008.

=== Concerns about sustainability of legal practice ===
Stakeholders in the legal industry have periodically raised concerns about the sustainability of legal practice.

On 20 August 2024, the Law Society of Singapore published a guidance note titled "Sustainable Practice Initiative" in which it asserted it was committed to preserving the mental and social well-being of its members in practice. The guidance note sets out various guidelines which should generally be followed by practitioners to mitigate unworkable or reasonable timelines and directions.

On 20 September 2024, Chief Justice Sundaresh Menon drew attention to the sustainability of legal practice, which he described as a growing concern. He revealed that survey responses collected from applicants at the 2024 Mass Call revealed that around two thirds indicated they were likely to move out of legal practice in the next 5 years, slightly more than one third indicated that they were likely to leave the legal profession altogether during the same period. He observed that this appeared to be the result of "push" factors rather than "pull" factors, and a substantial number of respondents indicated that they intended to leave due to excessive workload, poor work-life balance, or poor workplace culture.

== Law firms in Singapore ==
The Big Four law firms in Singapore are generally regarded to be Allen & Gledhill, Rajah & Tann, WongPartnership and Drew & Napier. In addition, Dentons Rodyk & Davidson has in recent years been self-described as a "Big Five" law firm. This description has appeared most frequently in private legal ranking directories and on two occasions in The Straits Times.

=== Ranking by scale ===
The following table ranks, by size, the largest 20 domestic and international law firms with at least one office situated in Singapore in 2025.

2022 rank	Name	Headquarter(s)	Total number of partners	Total number of associates	Total number of lawyers	Remarks
1	Allen & Gledhill	Singapore	151	304	466	Domestic with regional legal network
2	Drew & Napier	Singapore	120	146	390	Domestic with regional legal network
3	WongPartnership	Singapore	126	236	362	Domestic with regional legal network
4	Rajah & Tann	Singapore	168	191	359	Domestic with regional legal network
5	Dentons Rodyk & Davidson	Singapore for local entity; Polycentric for Dentons	93	84	179	International & Swiss Verein
6	Shook Lin & Bok	Singapore	61	80	141	Domestic
7	Baker & McKenzie Wong & Leow	Singapore for local entity; Chicago for Baker McKenzie	33	83	134	International & Swiss Verein
8	Withers KhattarWong	London	32	63	95	International
9	Clifford Chance	London	20	61	87	Magic Circle
10	Harry Elias Partnership	Singapore	24	54	78	Domestic
11	Allen & Overy	London	15	58	75	Magic Circle
12	Stephenson Harwood (Singapore) Alliance with Virtus Law LLP	London	21	46	67	International
13	Norton Rose Fulbright	London	15	46	61	International & Swiss Verein
14	RHTLaw Asia	Singapore	23	23	58	Domestic with regional legal network
15	Bird & Bird ATMD	Singapore for local entity; London for Bird & Bird	14	36	50	International
16	Oon & Bazul	Singapore	19	29	48	Domestic
17	K&L Gates Straits Law	Singapore for local entity; Pittsburgh for K&L Gates	16	24	48	International
18	Herbert Smith Freehills	London & Sydney	14	15	47	International
19	White & Case	New York City	14	31	45	International
20	Ashurst	London	15	25	40	International

== Education and training ==
=== Replacement of pupillage system ===
In 2009, Parliament approved changes to replace the 'pupillage' system with structured training, and to make it easier for lawyers to return to practice.

=== Decoupling admission to the Bar from practising certificate ===
In August 2016, Chief Justice Sundaresh Menon established a Committee for the Professional Training of Lawyers (CPTL) to conduct a "root-and-branch" review of the professional training regime for lawyers in Singapore and to make recommendations on how it might be improved to raise the quality and consistency of training standards.

On 29 March 2018, the CPTL released its report, which included three key recommendations: (a) decouple admission to the Bar from the right to practise law; (b) raise the standard and stringency of the Part B examinations; and (c) lengthen the practice training period from six months to a year. The CTPL also made various other specific recommendations.

In August 2018, MinLaw announced that it had accepted the CTPL's recommendations in principle and that the changes would be implemented from the 2023 session of the Part B examinations onwards.

MinLaw conducted a public consultation on the CTPL's proposals from 15 November 2019 to 27 December 2019.

On 27 February 2023, it was announced that the implementation of the new professional training regime based on the CTPL's recommendations would be deferred and would only apply from the 2024 session of the Part B examinations onwards. According to MinLaw, the deferment was on account of feedback from the legal industry to the effect that more time was required to adapt to the recommended changes, taking into account the impact of the COVID-19 pandemic. For example, according to Gregory Vijayendran, the doubling of the practice training period would in effect double the cumulative allowance that needed to be paid to trainees. Ng Wai King also explained that law firms needed more time to review their human capital needs and rethink their training requirements.

On 3 October 2023, the Ministry of Law introduced the Legal Profession (Amendment) Bill in Parliament to implement the changes.

In November 2023, the Legal Profession (Amendment) Act was passed by Parliament.

==== Controversy regarding the lengthening of the training period ====
The lengthening of the statutory practice training period from six months to a year has drawn mixed reactions. During the Parliamentary debate on the legislative amendments required to lengthen the training period, various Members of Parliament expressed concerns about fair remuneration and benefits such as paid sick leave, in light of the lengthened training period.

NTUC Assistant Secretary-General Patrick Tay drew attention to the adverse financial impact on trainees, noting that trainee lawyers typically work long hours and are paid honoraria of between SGD 1,000 to SGD 2,500 a month, which is substantially lower than their peers in other industries, who typically earn between SGD 3,500 to SGD 5,000 a month. Tay stated that this "can be seen as exploitative" and noted that this may disproportionately impact trainees from lower-income backgrounds, who may need a reasonable income during their training period to support their families. He also called for trainees to be entitled to "basic employment rights", such as paid annual and sick leave, as "everyone falls ill".

Yip Hon Weng suggested mandating a minimum wage for trainees, similar to what housemen are paid in the medical field. It was also noted that trainees do not receive other employment benefits such as paid leave or Central Provident Fund (CPF) contributions which employees in Singapore are typically entitled to under the Employment Act.

Senior Parliament Secretary for Law, Rahayu Mahzam explained that MinLaw understood these concerns and these issues were being looked into. However, she cautioned that larger honorariums would need to be balanced against potential increases in costs to firms, particularly smaller firms.

=== Admission to the Bar ===
A person seeking to be admitted to the Singapore Bar will generally need to meet the requirements to be a 'qualified person' (QP) and complete the Part B examinations (a practical course of instruction, culminating in practical and written examinations).

To be considered a QP, a person will need to obtain an approved law degree. A list of approved law degrees is set out in the Legal Profession (Qualified Persons) Rules, which includes Bachelor of Laws and Juris Doctor degrees from various universities in Singapore, Australia, New Zealand, England, and the United States.

Persons seeking to be QPs solely on the basis of an approved law degree conferred by a university outside Singapore will generally need to fulfil additional requirements to qualify as a QP, namely:

1. They must be a Singapore citizen or permanent resident
2. They must graduate with at least a Second Class Honours or be in the top 70% of their cohort
3. Their degree programme must have been undertaken on a full-time basis, they must have been an internal candidate, and the course of study must have been for at least 3 academic years
4. The degree must not have been conferred as part of a twinning programme, must not be a combined or dual degree, external degree, or accelerated degree
5. They must complete six months of relevant legal training (RLT) in Singapore or overseas
6. They must pass the Part A examinations

== See also ==
- List of Hong Kong law firms by size
- Admission to practice law in Singapore
- Judicial system of Singapore
- Law of Singapore
- Law Society of Singapore
- Singapore Academy of Law
- Singapore Legal Service
