= TLB (legal consultancy) =

- Headquarters: London, SE1, United Kingdom
- No. of offices: 1
- No. of lawyers: 10
- Key people: Electra Japonas (CEO, Founder and Senior Strategic Consultant); Roisin Noonan (CCO, COO); Robert Jarrett (Head of Delivery)
- Date founded: 2015
- Company type: Private Limited Company
- Website: www.tlb.law

The Law Boutique, (trade name TLB) is a London based legal consultancy founded in 2015 by Electra Japonas. The company began as a legal managed services business, but now also operates as a legal design consultancy. TLB offers a range of services, including legal tech implementation, document design, legal operations and other ongoing support.

Having worked together on the oneNDA initiative, Linklaters, CreateiQ and TLB announced a formal partnership in October 2022. The aim of the collaboration is to offer clients holistic legal advice while also advising on the implementation of technology and digitisation of legal processes.

As of 2023 TLB consists of 10 employees.

== History ==
The company was founded in March 2015 as White Sail Research Ltd by Electra Japonas and Adam Hidler, before being relaunched as The Law Boutique in August 2017. Before founding TLB, Japonas spent over 10 years as an in-house lawyer for various companies including The European Space Agency, Disney, BAT and Ernest & Young. Japonas positioned the company as a legal consultancy under the name The Law Boutique, as she felt that there was a gap between the commercial and legal teams within businesses in the UK. The aim was to help in-house lawyers through various means such as technology implementation, design led legal solutions, and strategy consultancy.

In a 2020 interview with 'The Lawyer' Japonas described TLB as taking a 'human centric, technology-driven approach' to 'maximise productivity and power business growth.'

TLB focuses on legal optimisation, which Japonas defines as: "The way in which a legal function operates in the most optimal way. So without waste but also in a way that encourages commercial dealings. So how can you be a legal function that protects the business and encourages it to grow."

== oneNDA ==
oneNDA was co-founded by Japonas and current TLB COO Roisin Noonan and launched in August 2021 as a crowd sourced, open source non-disclosure agreement aimed at standardising the NDA. oneNDA was started by TLB, and was co-designed with contributions from in-house lawyers from Coca-Cola, Bupa and UBS, as well as partners from Linklaters, Freshfields Bruckhaus Deringer, and Allen & Overy. oneNDA began after a 2020 internal review from TLB showed that NDAs made up over 60% of all contracts drafted that year while only 7% of revenue was generated by them, (with fewer than one percent of NDAs ever being litigated). This led to Japonas posting on Linkedin in January 2021 suggesting a standardised NDA across the legal sector, created in a collaborative peer to peer way. That post received 30,000 views, leading to TLB setting up a website where people could register their interest with 330 organisations signing up by the end of the month.

A steering committee was set up of 60 lawyers and legal professionals from companies such as Linklaters, PwC, Barclays, and Airbus. Eventually the project had over 1200 people from the wider legal community giving input to the design of the document.

oneNDA was launched within five months and as of November 2022 had been downloaded more than 10,000 times and had been adopted formally by 650 companies. In 2022, the Financial Times newspaper awarded a collaboration award to TLB for oneNDA describing it as offering a 'blueprint' for "how the legal industry can collaborate".

== Awards and recognition ==
TLB has been the recipient of a number of awards and nominations, starting with being nominated at the Great British Entrepreneur Awards in the Service Industries Entrepreneur of the Year Category in 2019.

In 2020 TLB was named as a winner in the European Women of Legal Tech Awards, in the Law Firms and Professional Services category. TLB was named as Highly Commended in the Boutique Law Firm of the Year (1–10 Employees) award at the 2020 Modern Law Awards, and was shortlisted for the same award in 2022. They were nominated for the award for Legal Supplier Innovation at the 2020 LexisNexis Legal Awards and was highly commended at the 2020 Legal Business Awards. The following year, they were nominated for the Private Practice Rising Star Award at the 2021 ALM/Law.com British Legal Awards.

In 2022, the Financial Times' Accelerating Business Change Maker judging panel named TLB as a "champion of legal transformation". Japonas was also named in The Lawyer magazine's 'Hot 100 for 2022' list. oneNDA was awarded a Financial Times Collaboration Award for Design and Development in 2022.
