= Silver Circle (law firms) =

Law firms of the United Kingdom

The Silver Circle is an informal grouping of elite corporate law firms headquartered in London, described as historically comprising Ashurst, Herbert Smith, Macfarlanes, SJ Berwin and Travers Smith.

== Etymology ==
The term 'Silver Circle' was coined by The Lawyer magazine in response to the term 'Magic Circle' of London-headquartered firms who pursued global expansion in the 1990s. The original Silver Circle firms deliberately maintained leaner, UK-centric models focused on high-margin private equity and corporate work.

The Lawyer's editor Catrin Griffiths' definition in 2005 read thus: "Silver circle firms are content to advise a premium UK client base rather than service global institutions. A lot of work is private equity-dominated [...] it is sexy and it pays. By the way, there is something else that characterises these firms: a disdain for an overtly managerial approach and a horrified avoidance of big firm bureaucracy."

However, continued relevance of the designation has been frequently debated in the legal trade press. While originally describing elite firms with a strictly domestic focus, Silver Circle firms now compete for the same cross-border mandates as their Magic Circle peers. Some, such as Ashurst and Herbert Smith, have gone further, expanding their office networks internationally through mergers.

== History and evolution ==
=== The Silver Circle in 2005 ===
As defined by The Lawyer in 2005, the Silver Circle initially comprised Ashurst, Herbert Smith (now Herbert Smith Freehills Kramer), Macfarlanes, SJ Berwin and Travers Smith. At the time, Berwin Leighton Paisner was listed as an 'associate member' of the Silver Circle. According to The Lawyer it was "Not yet well enough established to merit full membership".

According to The Lawyer, Lovells (now Hogan Lovells Cadwalader) and Norton Rose (now Norton Rose Fulbright), which had ambitions of expanding internationally, did not meet the criteria for the Silver Circle and were instead designated in an 'internationalists' bracket that also included DLA Piper, Clyde & Co, Simmons & Simmons and Denton Wilde Sapte.

=== The Silver Circle in 2017 ===
In 2017, The Lawyer argued that the group of five firms which made up the original Silver Circle in 2005 had adopted different strategies. Three pursued international ambitions, while two remained UK-focused. Ashurst, Herbert Smith Freehills and SJ Berwin each followed international expansion strategies, and, according to The Lawyer, did not meet the criteria for continued membership of the Silver Circle.

The Lawyer was also of the view that Berwin Leighton Paisner, which initially had the potential to be a full member of the Silver Circle, did not meet the Circle's criteria.

In addition to Macfarlanes and Travers Smith, The Lawyer argued that Mishcon de Reya formed part of the Silver Circle.

== Relationship with the Magic Circle ==
The Silver Circle firms have a lower turnover than the members of the Magic Circle, but consistently have an average profits per equity partner (PEP) and average revenue per lawyer (RPL) far above the UK average (and, in some instances, higher than members of the magic circle).

The term 'Silver Circle', however, is not intended to mark these firms as subservient to the Magic Circle. Contrary to what the term 'Silver Circle' may suggest, there is no Golden Circle.

For the debate about Slaughter and May's membership of the Magic Circle and the Silver Circle, see Magic Circle.

== Related terms ==
- Big Three law firms, an informal term for leading law firms in New Zealand
- Big Four law firms, an informal term for leading law firms in Japan
- Big Five law firms, an informal term for leading law firms in South Africa
- Big Six law firms, an informal term for leading law firms in Australia. In 2012, three of these firms merged with overseas firms, and one other began operating in association with an overseas firm. As a consequence it has been proposed that the term is no longer applicable to the Australian legal profession, displaced by the concept of 'global elite law firms' or 'international business law firms'.
- Offshore magic circle, an informal term for leading law firms in offshore financial centers
- Red Circle law firms, an informal term for leading law firms in the People's Republic of China, coined by The Lawyer magazine in 2014. For further information, also see the list of the largest Chinese law firms.
- Seven Sisters law firms, a collection of seven leading Canadian law firms with offices in Toronto
- White Shoe law firms, an informal term for leading law firms in the United States
