= Magic Circle (law firms) =

Five London law firms

"Magic Circle" is an informal historical term describing five global elite London-headquartered multinational law firms, which generally outperform the rest of the London law firms in profitability. The term was coined by legal reporters in the 1990s and is generally considered to include the following five law firms: A&O Shearman, Clifford Chance, Freshfields, Linklaters, and Slaughter and May.

The term has also been used to describe elite barristers' chambers in London. All of the 'Magic Circle' law firms and barristers' chambers specialise primarily in corporate law.

== History and evolution ==
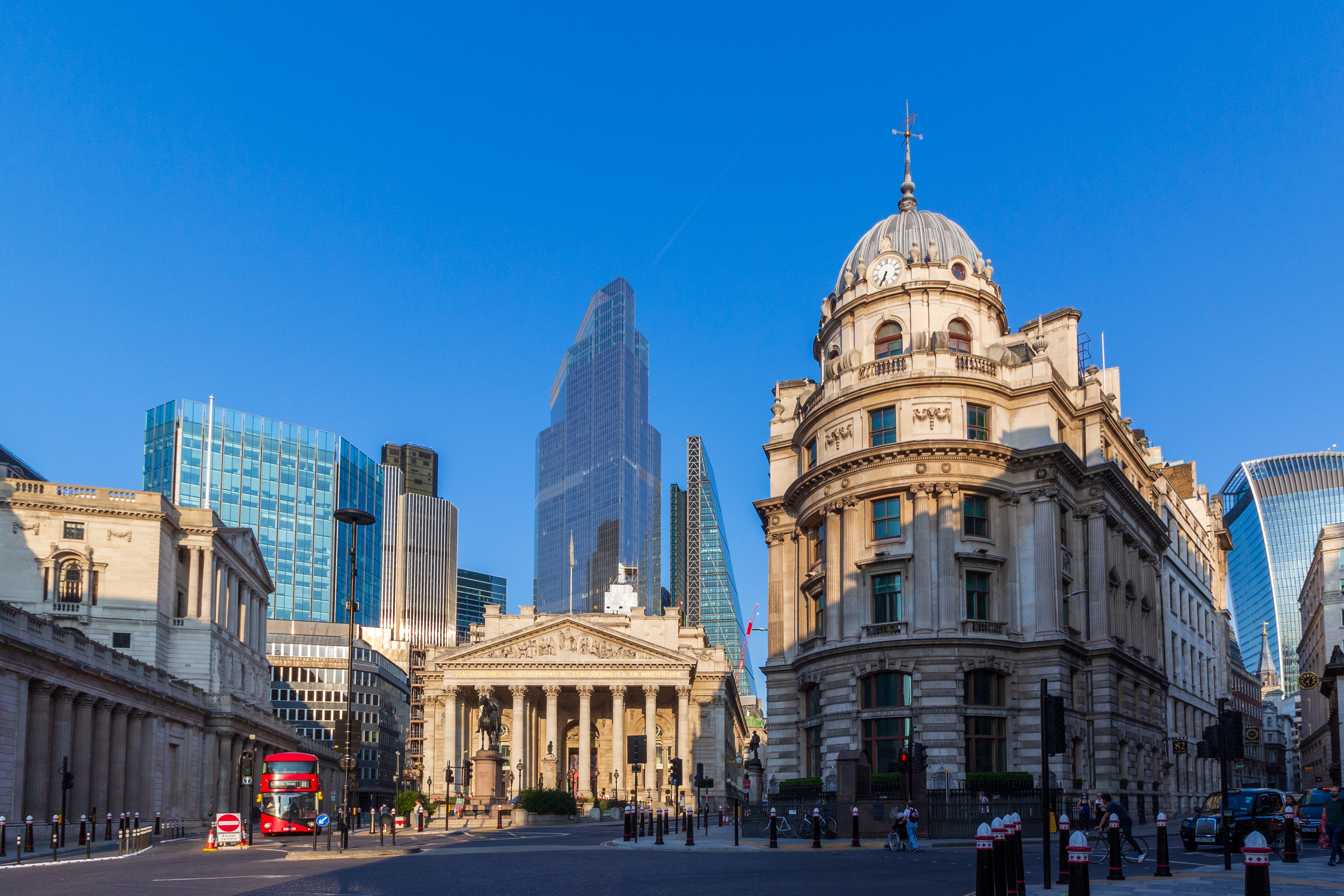
A&O Shearman, Freshfields and Linklaters are headquartered in the City of London. Slaughter & May's headquarters lie just outside the boundary of the City, in the Borough of Islington.

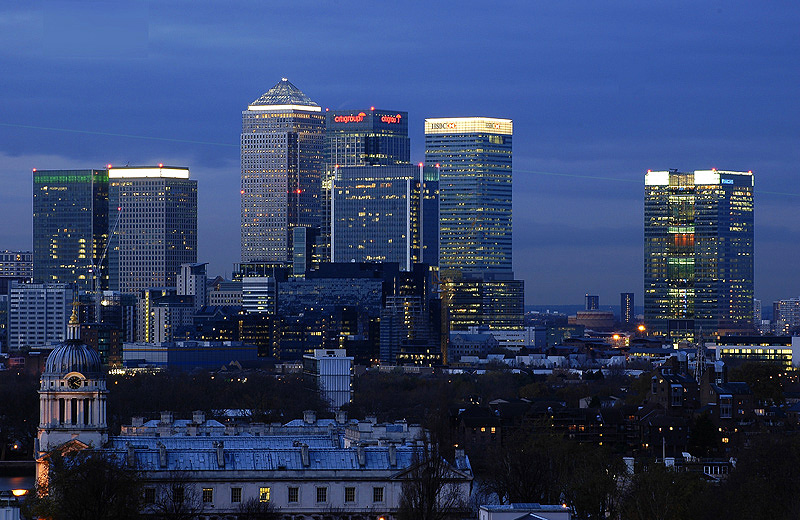
Clifford Chance is headquartered in Canary Wharf.

The Magic Circle has been termed a "journalistic device, coined by legal reporters in the wake of the break-up of its predecessor, the 'Club of Nine'". The Club of Nine was an informal group of law firms that comprised Allen & Overy (now A&O Shearman), Clifford Chance, Freshfields, Herbert Smith (now Herbert Smith Freehills Kramer), Linklaters, Lovells (now Hogan Lovells Cadwalader), Norton Rose (now Norton Rose Fulbright), Slaughter and May, and Stephenson Harwood. The members of the Club of Nine had an informal "no-poaching" agreement and the senior partners of each member firm would meet to share information. In 1996, Stephenson Harwood was asked to leave the Club of Nine due to its stagnant performance, and the Club was disbanded in 2000.

In contrast to the Club of Nine, the Magic Circle is an informal grouping of law firms. Initially, the Magic Circle's membership was described by commentators as comprising the UK firms with strong corporate practices or international work. The term "Magic Circle" denoted that the firms within it had outperformed the other Club of Nine counterparts. At the time, these firms were Allen & Overy, Clifford Chance, Freshfields, Linklaters, and Slaughter and May. Generally, the Magic Circle firms have among the highest earnings-per-partner and earnings-per-lawyer of UK-headquartered law firms.

In 2004, Slaughter and May's then senior partner, Tim Clark, said: "It's a funny concept. I don't know where the term came from or who founded it. It's mainly something that comes up when we talk to journalists or they talk to us. We don't describe ourselves as a Magic Circle firm in any of our marketing material." Linklaters' then head of corporate, David Cheyne, said: "City law firms years ago used to provide information to each other so they could keep in touch with what was going on, but that ended yonks ago... It seems to be a term to describe the leading City firms and there is some truth in it." Then corporate partner at Herbert Smith Freehills and former investment banker Henry Raine said: "The phrase was coined by a legal magazine and referred to firms which were very strong in corporate or international work. At the time, Herbert Smith was languishing in the corporate stakes, and so was consigned to the outer darkness."

In 2013, The Lawyer argued that Clifford Chance and Slaughter and May should no longer form part of the Magic Circle. It argued that Clifford Chance's profitability did not match the other Magic Circle firms, and that Slaughter and May operated a different (UK-focused) model, with revenue less than half that of the other Magic Circle firms. In 2017 The Lawyer magazine stated that it no longer considered Slaughter and May to form part of the Magic Circle due to its lower revenues and UK domestic focus. It wrote "Slaughters fits the silver circle bill in every respect. London-centric, sky-high PEP, top-tier work, an aura of prestige: Slaughter and May is far more like Macfarlanes than the Magic Circle quartet it is commonly lumped in with. To put it in the same category as Allen & Overy, Clifford Chance, Freshfields and Linklaters would be inaccurate, and to say it is in a class of its own is frankly showing the firm too much deference." Nonetheless, other commentators still consider Slaughter and May to be a member of the Magic Circle.

=== Best firms included ===
Among the large firms included in the term are Herbert Smith Freehills Kramer, Hogan Lovells Cadwalader, Norton Rose Fulbright and Stephenson Harwood, which are less profitable. Also, at the time the term was coined, the corporate practice at Herbert Smith (as it was known pre-merger) was focused on privatisation work, which had dried up. Arguably for this reason, it was not included in the initial Magic Circle.

== Relationship with the Silver Circle ==
The Silver Circle is an informal term for perceived elite corporate law firms headquartered in the United Kingdom that are the main competitors for the Magic Circle in the United Kingdom. The term was coined by The Lawyer magazine in 2005 in response to the pre-existing term, Magic Circle. These firms have a lower turnover than the members of the Magic Circle, but consistently have an average profits per equity partner (PEP) and average revenue per lawyer (RPL) far above the UK average (and, in some instances, higher than members of the Magic Circle). Contrary to what the term Silver Circle may suggest, there is no Golden Circle.

== Impact of globalisation and relevance of the term ==
UK law firms, including Magic Circle law firms, have experienced increased competition from US law firms both domestically (from US law firms with a UK presence) and internationally.

In 2013, The Lawyer argued that the term Magic Circle would lose its relevance, becoming "outmoded": "It will remain an easy shorthand to denote the UK-heritage firms with the biggest revenues, the most international work and which consistently outperform the rest of the [UK] market on profitability." It was argued that by 2023 global law firms would rather be split between the Global Elite law firms, International Business law firms and Super Boutique law firms.

The Global Elite law firms compriseCleary Gottlieb Steen & Hamilton; Davis Polk & Wardwell; Kirkland & Ellis; White & Case; Latham & Watkins; Simpson Thacher & Bartlett; Skadden, Arps, Slate, Meagher & Flom; Sidley Austin; and Weil, Gotshal & Manges.

The International Business law firms comprise CMS; Ashurst; Baker McKenzie; DLA Piper; Hogan Lovells (now Hogan Lovells Cadwalader); Jones Day; King & Wood Mallesons (Now King & Wood and Mallesons) and Norton Rose Fulbright.

The Super Boutique law firms comprise Cravath, Swaine & Moore; Sullivan & Cromwell; Paul, Weiss, Rifkind, Wharton & Garrison; Slaughter and May; and Wachtell, Lipton, Rosen & Katz.

In 2014, it was reported that Freshfields wished to discard its Magic Circle designation in the US in favour of being part of the Global Elite. Similarly, in 2014, Linklaters' then managing partner, Simon Davies, said "The Magic Circle isn't what it used to be in the context of the US market or any market. I don't think it's going to gain power or momentum and I don't think it's a strengthening brand in itself," and "At the end of the day we see ourselves as one of the leading global law firms, not one of the leading Magic Circle firms".

== Barristers' chambers ==
The following barristers' chambers in the United Kingdom are occasionally, by analogy, described by commentators as the Bar's Magic Circle:

- Blackstone Chambers
- Brick Court Chambers
- Essex Court Chambers
- Fountain Court Chambers
- One Essex Court

In August 2018, research from The Lawyer, however, showed that South Square Chambers received more instructions from the Magic Circle law firms than any other chambers. Its barristers had worked on 64 matters for the Magic Circle law firms since 2015.

== Related terms ==
- Big Three law firms, an informal term for leading law firms in New Zealand.
- Big Four law firms, an informal term for leading law firms in Japan.
- Big Five law firms, an informal term for leading law firms in South Africa.
- Big Six law firms, an informal term for leading law firms in Australia. In 2012, three of these firms merged with overseas firms, and one other began operating in association with an overseas firm. As a consequence, it has been proposed that the term is no longer applicable to the Australian legal profession, displaced by the concept of Global Elite law firms or International Business law firms.
- Offshore magic circle, an informal term for leading law firms in offshore financial centers.
- Red Circle law firms, an informal term for leading law firms in the People's Republic of China coined by The Lawyer magazine in 2014. For further information, see also the list of the largest Chinese law firms.
- Seven Sisters law firms, a collection of seven leading Canadian law firms with offices in Toronto.
- White Shoe law firms, an informal term for leading law firms in the United States.

== See also ==
- Big Four accounting firms
- Big Three (management consultancies)
