= McCarthy Tétrault =

Canadian law firm

McCarthy Tétrault LLP
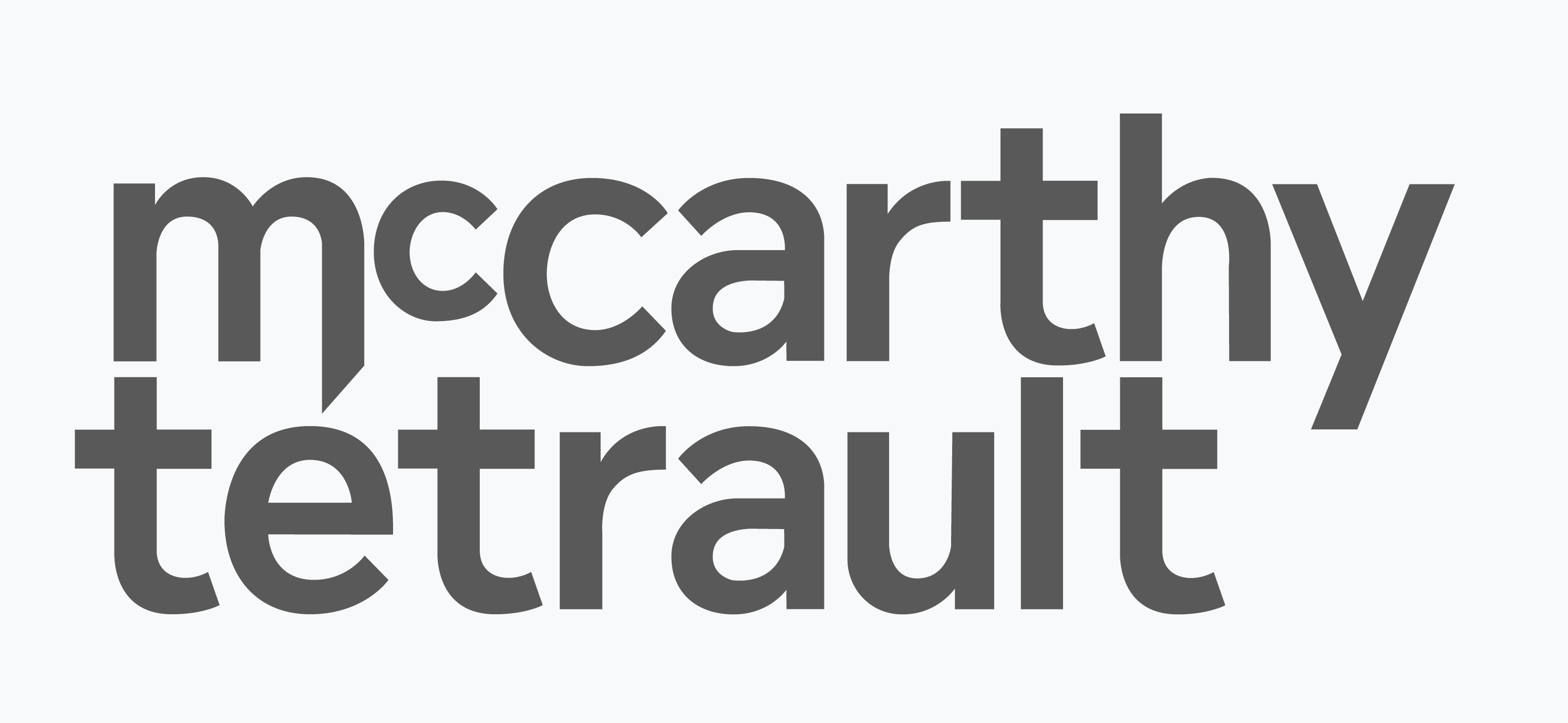
- Headquarters: Toronto, Ontario, Canada
- No. of offices: 7
- Date founded: 1855
- Company type: Limited liability partnership
- Website: mccarthy.ca

McCarthy Tétrault LLP is a Canadian law firm with offices in Vancouver, Calgary, Toronto, Montréal, Québec City, London and New York City. The firm advises on areas including business law, litigation, tax law, real property law, and labour and employment law. It is commonly listed among Canada's Seven Sisters law firms.

== History ==
The firm's origins are traced to Boulton & McCarthy, a law firm established in Barrie, Ontario, in 1855 by D'Arcy Boulton and D'Alton McCarthy Sr. McCarthy's son, D'Alton McCarthy Jr., articled at the firm and was called to the bar in 1859. In 1869, the McCarthys left the partnership and established their own firm.

D'Alton McCarthy Jr. later became active in federal politics. He was elected to the House of Commons in 1876 and became a prominent lawyer in election-related litigation. In 1877, after opening a Toronto office, the firm became McCarthy, Hoskin, Plumb and Creelman.

In 1882, Britton Bath Osler joined the partnership, and the firm was renamed McCarthy, Osler, Hoskin & Creelman. Osler's arrival was connected with legal work for the Canadian North-West Land Company, the real estate arm of the Canadian Pacific Railway. The firm was later renamed McCarthy, Osler, Hoskin & Harcourt after Frederick Harcourt's name was added to the partnership.

In 1916, the firm split into two practices. D'Alton Lally McCarthy, Leighton McCarthy and Frank McCarthy formed McCarthy & McCarthy, while other partners continued as Osler, Hoskin & Harcourt.

McCarthy Tétrault was formed in 1990 through the merger of McCarthy & McCarthy of Toronto, Clarkson Tétrault of Montréal, Shrum Liddle & Hebenton of Vancouver, and Black & Company of Calgary. The Alberta aspect of the merger was affected by rules of the Law Society of Alberta that restricted partnerships with lawyers outside the province and membership in more than one firm. In Black v. Law Society of Alberta, the Supreme Court of Canada found those restrictions inconsistent with mobility rights under the Canadian Charter of Rights and Freedoms. The decision helped clear the way for national law-firm partnerships in Canada.

In October 2026, McCarthy Tétrault opened a physical office in Santiago, Chile. Later that month, the firm was among several major Canadian law firms that fell victim to voice phishing scams that provided unauthorized access to client files.

== Notable alumni ==
- D'Alton McCarthy Jr. (1836–1898), lawyer and Member of Parliament for Cardwell and Simcoe North
- Leighton McCarthy (1869–1952), lawyer, Member of Parliament for Simcoe North, and Canadian envoy and ambassador to the United States
- D'Alton Lally McCarthy (1870–1963), Treasurer of the Law Society of Upper Canada
- Britton Bath Osler (1839–1901), lawyer and crown prosecutor
- Wallace Nesbitt (1858–1930), Justice of the Supreme Court of Canada
- Salter Hayden (1896–1987), member of the Senate of Canada
- John J. Robinette (1906–1996), lawyer and Treasurer of the Law Society of Upper Canada
- Ian Binnie (born 1939), Justice of the Supreme Court of Canada
- Daniel Johnson Jr. (born 1944), Premier of Quebec
- Hubert Lacroix (born 1955), President of the Canadian Broadcasting Corporation
- John Manley (born 1950), Deputy Prime Minister of Canada and federal cabinet minister
- Wayne G. Wouters (born 1951), Clerk of the Privy Council
- Jean Charest (born 1958), Premier of Quebec and federal cabinet minister
- Marc-André Blanchard (born 1965), lawyer and diplomat
