= Fangda Partners =

Chinese law firm

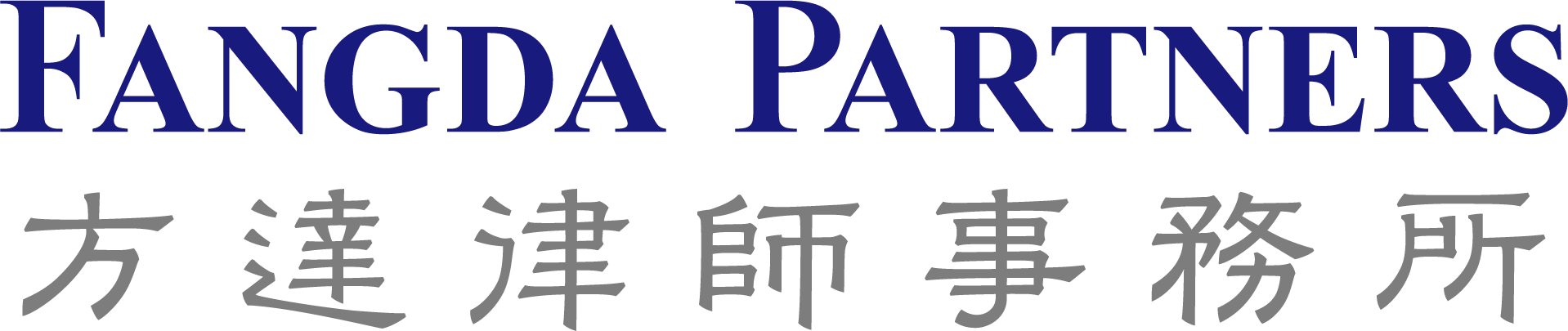
- Headquarters: Shanghai, China
- No. of offices: 7
- No. of lawyers: Approximately 800
- Major practice areas: General practice
- Date founded: 1993 (Shanghai)
- Website: www.fangdalaw.com/en/

Fangda Partners is a law firm headquartered in Shanghai, China with offices in Beijing, Guangzhou, Hong Kong, Nanjing, Shanghai, Shenzhen and Singapore. It is one of the 15 largest China-based law firms measured by number of lawyers. The firm focuses on Chinese and international companies, financial institutions, investment funds and other organisations on domestic and cross-border transactions, disputes, investigations, regulatory matters and other commercial legal issues. It is one of eight Red Circle law firms in China, perceived by some legal publications as prestigious or high-quality, analogous to the Magic Circle firms in the UK and white-shoe firms in the US.

== History ==
Fangda Partners was founded in Shanghai in 1993 by six partners. Fangda opened an office in Hong Kong in April 2012, following the recruitment of former Freshfields Bruckhaus Deringer litigation partner Peter Yuen. Fangda joined Ius Laboris, the international HR law firm network, in 2012. In 2024, Fangda opened an office in Singapore, its first office outside China.

== Main practice areas ==
Fangda has the following main practice areas:

- Antitrust/Competition
- Asset-Backed Securities
- Banking & Finance
- Capital Markets
- Compliance & Government Enforcement
- Dispute Resolution
- Energy & Infrastructure
- Finance Institutions
- General Industries
- Insolvency & Restructuring
- Intellectual Property
- Investment Funds
- Investment Management
- Labour & Employment
- Life Sciences & Healthcare
- M&A
- Private Equity
- Private Wealth Management
- Real Estate & Construction
- Technology, Media & Telecommunications

== See also ==
- List of largest Chinese law firms
- Legal history of China
- Chinese law
- Law of the People's Republic of China
