= White-shoe firm =

Term for prestigious professional firms

In the United States, "white-shoe firm" is a term used to describe prestigious professional services firms—particularly law firms, investment banks, and accounting firms—historically associated with the upper-class elite and Ivy League graduates. The term most often describes leading Wall Street institutions, particularly those based in New York City and Boston, that have existed for over a century. The term comes from white buckskin derby shoes (bucks), once the style among the men of the upper class.

While the term has historically implied a cultural homogeneity associated with White Anglo-Saxon Protestant men, the term is now used more broadly to denote firms that are long-established, prestigious, and specializing in complex, high-stakes business matters.

Former Wall Street attorney John Oller, author of White Shoe, credits Paul Drennan Cravath with creating the distinct model adopted by virtually all white-shoe law firms, the Cravath System, just after the beginning of the 20th century, about 50 years before the phrase white-shoe firm came into use.

== Etymology ==
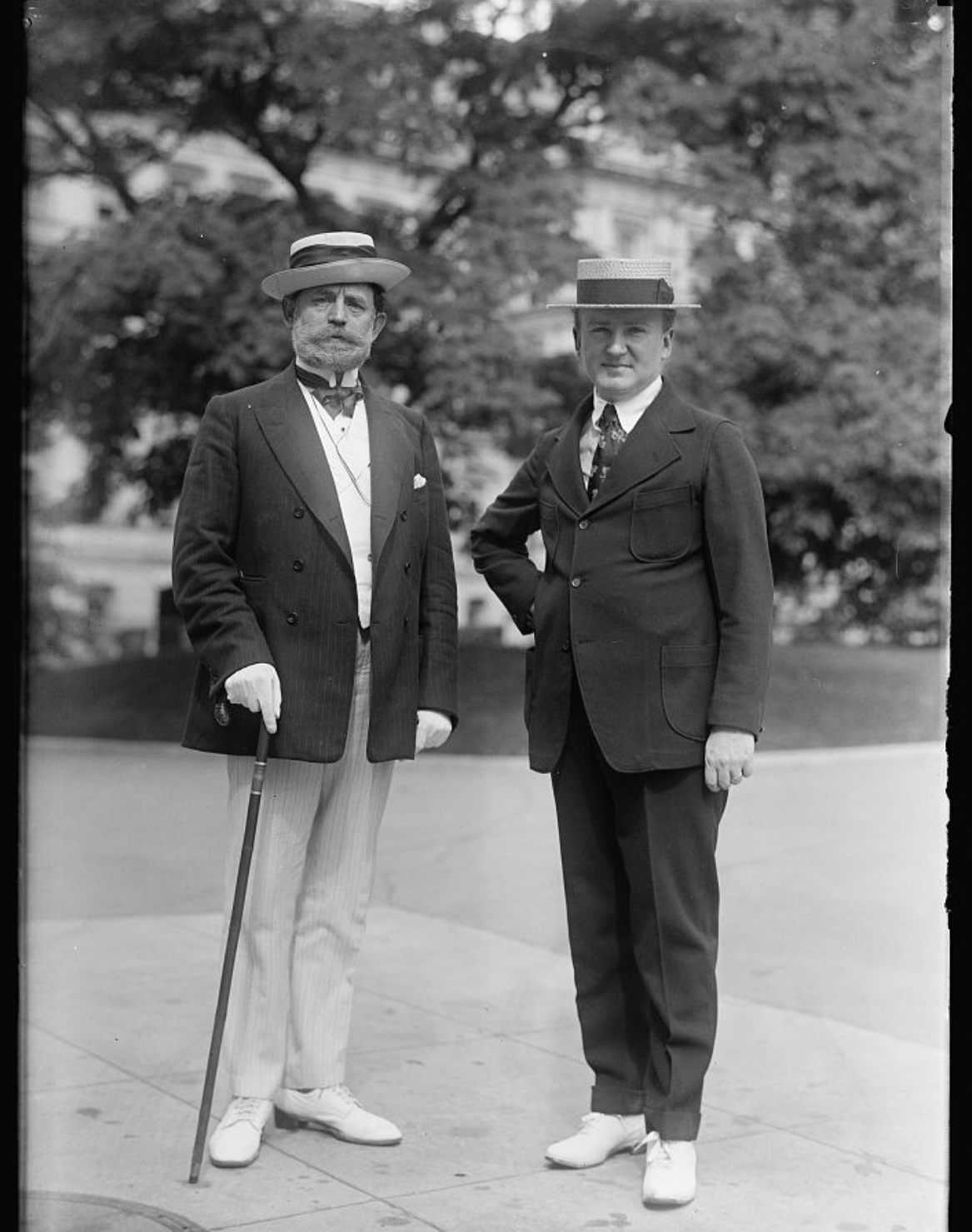
Senator J. Hamilton Lewis and attorney Joseph P. Tumulty pictured wearing "white bucks", 1917

The phrase derives from "white bucks", laced suede or buckskin (or Nubuck) derby shoes, usually with a red sole, long popular among the student body of Ivy League colleges. A 1953 Esquire article, describing social strata at Yale University, explained that "White Shoe applies primarily to the socially ambitious and the socially smug types who affect a good deal of worldly sophistication, run, ride and drink in rather small cliques, and look in on the second halves of football games when the weather is good." The Oxford English Dictionary cites the phrase "white-shoe college boys" in the J.D. Salinger novel Franny and Zooey (1957) as the first use of the term: "Phooey, I say, on all white-shoe college boys who edit their campus literary magazines. Give me an honest con man any day." It also appears in a 1958 Fortune article by Spencer Klaw, which describes some firms as having "a predilection for young men who are listed in the Social Register. These firms are called 'white-shoe outfits', a term derived from the buckskin shoes that used to be part of the accepted uniform at certain eastern prep schools and colleges."

== Usage ==
The American term white-shoe first originated in Ivy League colleges, then reflecting a stereotype of East Coast old-line firms that were populated by White Anglo-Saxon Protestants (WASPs). The term historically had antisemitic connotations, as many of the New York firms known as white-shoe were considered inaccessible to Jewish lawyers until the 1960s. The phrase has since lost some of this connotation, but is still defined by Princeton University's WordNet as "denoting a company or law firm owned and run by members of the WASP elite who are generally conservative". Most white-shoe firms also excluded Roman Catholics. A 2010 column in The Economist described the term as synonymous with "big, old, east-coast and fairly traditional." In the 21st century, the term is sometimes used in a general sense to refer to firms that are perceived as prestigious or high-quality; it is also sometimes used in a derogatory manner to denote stodginess, elitism, or a lack of diversity.

== Notable white-shoe firms ==
The following firms are often referred to in media as being white-shoe firms:

=== Accountancy ===
The current Big Four accounting firms and the former Big Eight auditors from which they merged:

- Deloitte (merged from Deloitte Haskins & Sells and Touche Ross)
- Ernst & Young (merged from Ernst & Whinney and Arthur Young)
- KPMG (formerly Peat Marwick Mitchell)
- PricewaterhouseCoopers (merged from Price Waterhouse and Coopers & Lybrand)

The only former Big Eight firm not merged into one of the Big Four is Arthur Andersen, defunct since 2002, following felony conviction resulting from the Enron scandal.

=== Banking ===
Traditional

- Brown Brothers Harriman & Co.
- JPMorgan Chase (successor to J.P. Morgan & Co.)
- Morgan Stanley

Modern

- Goldman Sachs
- Lazard Frères & Co.
- UBS

Defunct

- Dillon, Read & Co. (acquired by UBS in 1998)
- First Boston (acquired by Credit Suisse in 1990)
- Kuhn, Loeb & Co. (merged with Lehman Brothers in 1977)
- Lehman Brothers
- White Weld & Co. (acquired by Merrill Lynch in 1978)

=== Law ===
Traditional

- Covington & Burling
- Cravath, Swaine & Moore
- Davis Polk & Wardwell
- Debevoise & Plimpton
- Milbank
- Ropes & Gray
- Sidley Austin
- Simpson Thacher & Bartlett
- Sullivan & Cromwell
- White & Case
- Willkie Farr & Gallagher
- WilmerHale

Modern

While the term "white-shoe" historically applied only to those law firms populated by WASPs, usage of the term has since been expanded to other prestigious firms. Many of these firms were founded as a direct result of the exclusionary tendencies of the original white-shoe firms, which provided limited opportunities for Jewish and Catholic lawyers, as well as other non-WASPs, and include:

- Arnold & Porter
- Cleary, Gottlieb, Steen & Hamilton
- Gibson, Dunn & Crutcher
- King & Spalding
- Kirkland & Ellis
- Latham & Watkins
- Paul Hastings
- Paul, Weiss, Rifkind, Wharton & Garrison
- Skadden, Arps, Slate, Meagher & Flom
- Wachtell, Lipton, Rosen & Katz
- Weil, Gotshal & Manges
- Williams & Connolly

Defunct

- Cadwalader, Wickersham & Taft (merged with Hogan Lovells)
- Coudert Brothers
- Dewey & LeBoeuf
- Lord Day & Lord
- Shearman & Sterling (merged with Allen & Overy)
- Thacher Proffitt & Wood

=== Management consultancies ===
The Big Three consists of the largest management consulting firms by revenue, which are also colloquially known as "MBB":

- McKinsey & Company
- Boston Consulting Group
- Bain & Company

== Common terms for elite law firms outside of the United States ==
Australia
Big Six: In 2012, three of these firms merged with overseas firms, and one other began operating in association with an overseas firm. As a consequence, it has proposed that the term is no longer applicable to the Australian legal profession, displaced by the concept of Global Elite law firms or International Business law firms.
Canada
Seven Sisters
China (People's Republic)
Red Circle, coined by The Lawyer magazine in 2014.
Japan
Big Four
South Africa
Big Five
Singapore
Big Four
United Kingdom (centered in the City of London)

- Magic Circle, firms with the largest revenues, the most international work and which generally outperform the rest of the London market on profitability.
- Silver Circle, the next tier below the Magic Circle (there is no Golden Circle) has firms smaller than those in the Magic Circle, though sometimes with similar level of profits per equity partner (PEP) and average revenue per lawyer.
