= Vanni Treves =

British business executive (1940–2019)

Vanni Emanuele Treves CBE (1940 – 10 November 2019) was a British business executive. He was Chairman of Channel 4 (1998–2003), a senior partner of City law firm Macfarlanes, and Chairman (2001–2009) of Equitable Life.

== Biography ==
Treves was born in Florence, Italy in 1940. His father was killed during the Second World War in 1944 and his mother remarried, after which the family relocated to Swiss Cottage in London. He won a scholarship to the independent St Paul's School, London, before attending the University of Oxford to study jurisprudence. Treves later completed a Fulbright scholarship in the United States at the University of Illinois. He relinquished his dual Italian-British nationality at the age of 36 when he realised that it made him eligible for national service in the Italian Army.

Following his graduation from Oxford, Treves joined Macfarlanes in 1963 and went on to become a specialist in corporate governance. It was this that led to his appointment as a non-executive director of Saatchi & Saatchi in 1987. During the 1990s he went on to develop a career, as Philip Inman puts it, as a "serial chairman." In 2001 he took up the chairmanship of Equitable Life, determined to resolve its troubles.

== Personal life ==
Treves was married with two sons and a daughter. He was a donor to the Labour Party.

== Distinctions ==
- 2012: Commander of the Order of the British Empire (CBE) (as chair of the National College for School Leadership).

== Publications ==
- Treves, Vanni (April 2013). What life after retirement from the law?. The Times.

Media offices
Preceded by Michael Bishop	Chairman of Channel 4 January 1998 – December 2003	Succeeded by Luke Johnson
