= Edmund Boyd Osler (Ontario politician) =

Canadian politician (1845–1924)

Sir Edmund Osler
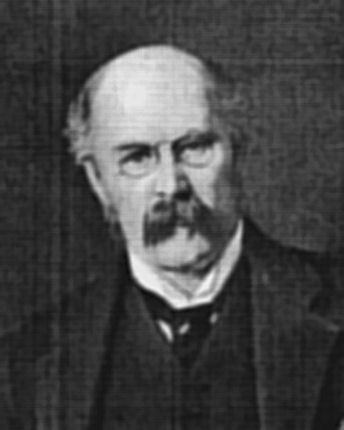
- Osler in 1896
- Born: Edmund Boyd Osler; 20 November 1845; Bond Head, Canada West
- Died: 4 August 1924 (aged 78); Toronto, Ontario, Canada
- Political party: Conservative
- Relatives: Britton Bath Osler (brother); Sir William Osler (brother); Anne Wilkinson (granddaughter); Edmund B. Osler (grandson)

Sir Edmund Boyd Osler (20 November 1845 – 4 August 1924) was a Canadian businessman, politician and philanthropist. He was a founder and benefactor of the Royal Ontario Museum.

== Early life ==
Osler was born in 1845 at Bond Head near Tecumseh Township, Simcoe County, Canada West. He was the fourth son of the Reverend Featherstone Lake Osler, a former lieutenant in the Royal Navy turned Anglican clergyman, and his wife Ellen Free Pickton. Osler attended grammar school in Dundas. Unlike his elder brothers, he did not attend university.

== Financial career ==
In the late 1850s, Osler began his career as a clerk at the Bank of Upper Canada. The bank failed in 1866. Osler became business partners with his colleague Henry Pellatt Sr (father of Henry Pellatt Jr) and together they launched their own firm specializing in stockbroking, investment, and insurance services. Osler often served as a financier in numerous business ventures. Throughout the 1880s to 1890s, Osler greatly increased his financial influence through a combination of investments, westward railway expansions, and western land grants. Osler was an early shareholder of the Dominion Bank and gained a directorship with the bank in 1881. He would become the bank’s president in 1901.

Beginning in the 1880s, Osler began working in the transportation industry through railways. Osler was the founder and managing director of the Ontario and Qu'Appelle Land Company Limited. His business expertise and connections led to his presidency of the Ontario and Quebec Railway followed by a directorship with the Canadian Pacific Railway. In 1896, Osler became the president of the Board of Trade. Osler was also the president of the Toronto Ferry Company.

== Political career ==
Due to his financial success, many believed that Osler should enter politics. Osler began his political career in the 1892 mayoralty race. He lost to R.J. Fleming despite having the support of the Toronto establishment. Osler ran in the 1896 federal election and was elected to the House of Commons of Canada as the Conservative representative of West Toronto. He served as an MP until 1917. Osler was knighted in 1912.

== Later life ==
After his political retirement, Osler continued to have an active involvement in Canadian business. By 1921, Osler concurrently held directorships in eight companies, presidencies in another three, and vice-presidency in one. Osler died in 1924 at the age of 78. At the time of his death, his estate was valued at nearly $4 million. In the years prior to his death, Osler had promised money to his friends to support various funds and causes which were posthumously covered by his estate.

== Philanthropy ==
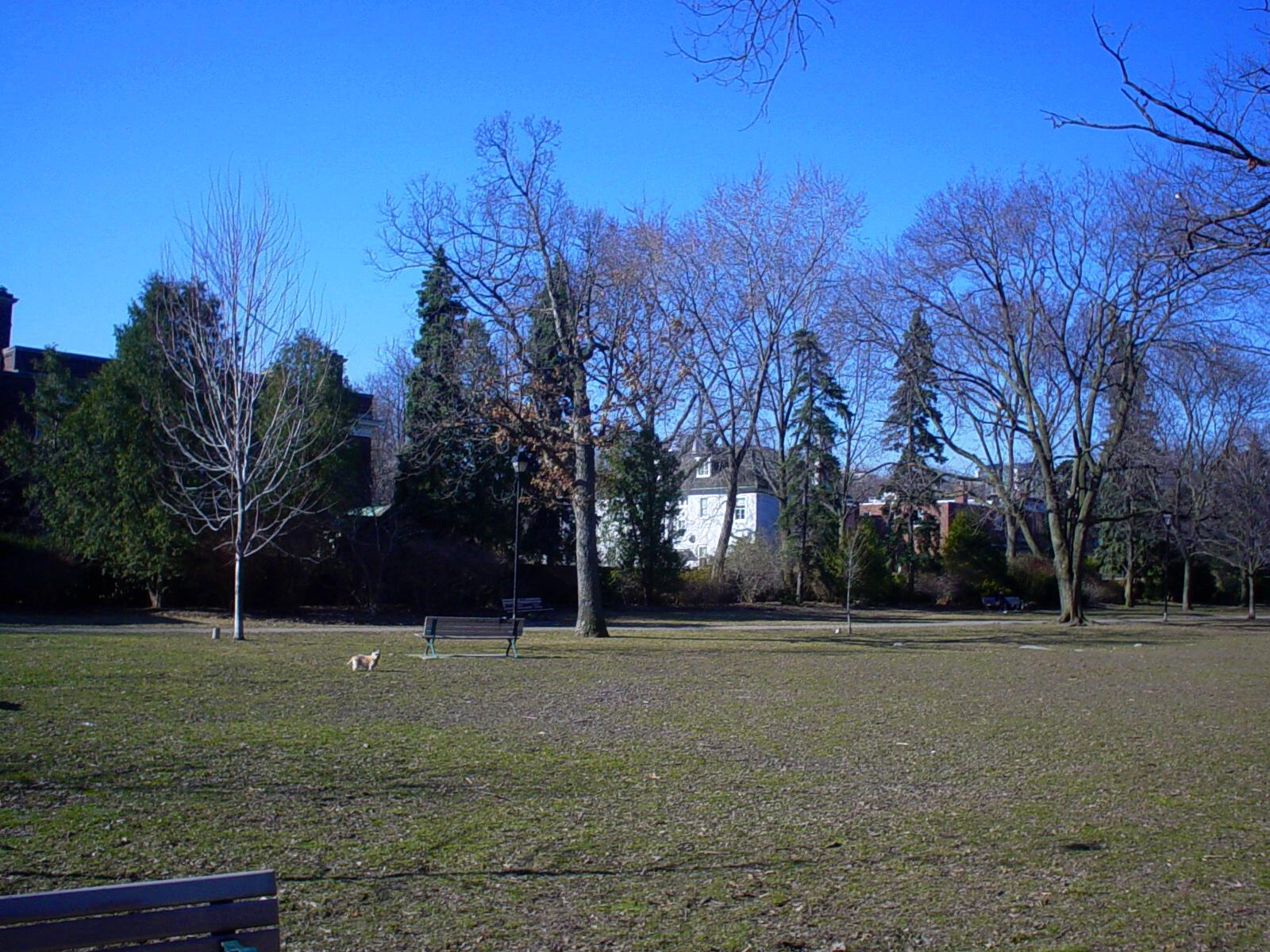
Craigleigh Gardens in 2002

Beginning in the 1870s Osler became involved with philanthropy. His expertise as a successful businessman helped fund and support important causes related to arts, cultures, and health in the city of Toronto. Osler became a trustee for the Hospital for Sick Children in 1878. He also helped fund the new Toronto General Hospital. Osler lived in the Toronto neighbourhood of Rosedale at his estate Craigleigh. The Osler family donated the estate to the City of Toronto government after Osler's death; today the site of Craigleigh Gardens.

Osler was a founder and generous benefactor to the Royal Ontario Museum. Together with George Agnew Reid, Byron Edmund Walker and others, Osler participated in the campaign to found an art museum in Toronto in the early 1900s. Osler began his involvement on a trip to Egypt from 1906 to 1907 where he met Charles T. Currelly, archaeologist and future director of the Royal Ontario Museum. In 1909 Osler personally pledged $50 000 over five years to assist with the collection of artefacts for the future museum. Osler would further contribute in 1912 by donating a large collection of paintings by Paul Kane to the cause. Through Osler’s and others influence, the Crown passed the Royal Ontario Museum Act in 1912 which led to the opening of the Royal Ontario Museum in 1914. Osler's descendants, the Matthews family, continue to support the Royal Ontario Museum to the present day. The Royal Ontario Museum's Sir Edmund Osler Gate to the wing of the Matthews Family Court of Chinese Sculpture is named after him.

== Personal life ==
Osler was born at Tecumseh Township, Simcoe County, Canada West and grew up in the area of present-day Hamilton, Ontario. His brothers were lawyer Britton Bath Osler (founder of what is now Osler, Hoskin & Harcourt) and doctor Sir William Osler.

Osler was married twice. He married his first wife, Isabella Lammond Smith, in 1868. Smith and Osler had two children who died in infancy and Smith died in 1871. In 1873, Osler married Annie Farquarson (1848 – 1910). The couple had six children; three daughters and three sons. Osler’s grandson, Edmund Boyd Osler (1919-1987), was a Liberal member of the Canadian House of Commons for Winnipeg South Centre and his granddaughter, Anne Wilkinson (1910-1961), was a highly regarded Canadian poet.

Osler was a close personal friend of Canadian railway magnate Hugh Ryan and served as one of his pallbearers —alongside Ontario politician, William Harty; Conservative Senator, James Mason; Ontario Banker, W.S. Lee; and Canadian businessman Eugene O'Keefe —at his funeral held in St Michael's Cathedral Basilica in 1899.

Osler descended from a British family with a long naval tradition. Edmund's great grandfather, Edward Osler, was variously described as either a merchant seaman or a pirate. One of Edmund's uncles served as a medical officer in the Navy and wrote the Life of Lord Exmouth and the poem The Voyage. Osler’s father was Featherstone Lake Osler (1805–1895). Featherstone was the son of a ship owner from Falmouth, Cornwall. Featherstone formerly served in the Royal Navy as a Lieutenant on the H.M.S. Victory. In 1831 Featherstone Osler was invited to serve on H.M.S. Beagle as the science officer on Charles Darwin's historic voyage to the Galápagos Islands, but turned it down as his father was dying. Featherstone retired from the navy in 1837 and emigrated to Canada. Featherstone married Ellen Free Pickton and they had four sons, Edmund was their youngest. In Canada, Featherstone became an Anglican Reverend.
