= Osler, Hoskin & Harcourt =

Canadian law firm

Osler, Hoskin & Harcourt LLP
- Headquarters: Toronto
- No. of offices: 6
- Offices: Toronto, Montreal, Calgary, Ottawa, Vancouver, New York
- Date founded: 1862
- Company type: Limited liability partnership
- Website: www.osler.com

Osler, Hoskin & Harcourt LLP is a Canadian-based law firm founded in 1862. Osler is considered one of the Seven Sisters (law firms), a historical collection of seven law firms with offices in Toronto, Ontario.

== History ==
The firm was founded in 1862 by Britton Bath Osler, the eldest of three famous brothers—the other two being Sir William Osler, one of the four founding professors of Johns Hopkins Hospital, and Edmund Boyd Osler, an early president of the Dominion Bank (now, TD Bank). Osler would later join D'Alton McCarthy's Toronto partnership, subsequently known as McCarthy, Osler, Hoskin and Creelman. It was McCarthy's firm, Boulton & McCarthy, in Barrie, Ontario, which eventually became the firm now known as McCarthy Tétrault, reflecting the common heritage of the two firms.

== Recognition ==
McCarthy, Osler, Hoskin and Creelman became a leading law firm in Toronto. In 1968, Osler became the first large corporate law firm in Canada to admit a woman as a partner, Bertha Wilson, who went on to become the first female justice appointed to the Supreme Court of Canada. Osler died in 1900, and the firm would eventually, in 1916, adopt the current name of Osler, Hoskin & Harcourt.
