= Marike Paulsson =

American legal scholar

Marike Paulsson was, from 2014 to 2019, the Director of the University of Miami's School of Law International Arbitration Institute - a research think-tank in the field of international arbitration. She has experience working with Hanotiau & van den Berg in Brussels, Belgium, and Freshfields Bruckhaus Deringer and Allen & Overy in Amsterdam, the Netherlands. She currently serves as Senior Advisor at Albright Stonebridge Group.
