= Britton Bath Osler =

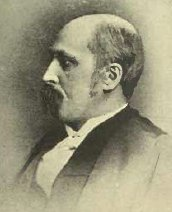
- Born: 19 June 1839; Bond Head, Upper Canada
- Died: 5 February 1901 (aged 61); Atlantic City, New Jersey, U.S.
- Occupation: Lawyer
- Relatives: Sir Edmund Osler (brother); Sir William Osler (brother)

Britton Bath Osler, KC (19 June 1839 – 5 February 1901) was a Canadian lawyer and prosecutor. The eldest of three prominent brothers (the other two being Sir Edmund Osler and Sir William Osler), he was born in Bond Head, Upper Canada.

== Background ==
His father, the Reverend Featherstone Lake Osler (1805–1895), the son of a shipowner at Falmouth, Cornwall, was a former lieutenant in the Royal Navy and served on H.M.S. Victory. In 1831, he was invited to serve on H.M.S. Beagle as the science officer on Charles Darwin's historic voyage to the Galápagos Islands, but he turned it down as his father was dying. As a teenager, Featherstone Osler was aboard H.M.S. Sappho when it was nearly destroyed by Atlantic storms and left adrift for weeks. Serving in the Navy, he was shipwrecked off Barbados. In 1837, he retired from the Navy and immigrated to Canada, becoming a 'saddle-bag minister' in rural Upper Canada. On arriving in Canada, he and his bride (Ellen Free Pickton) were nearly ship-wrecked again on Egg Island in the Gulf of Saint Lawrence.

Britton's great-grandfather, Edward Osler, was variously described as either a merchant seaman or a pirate, and one of Britton's uncles, a medical officer in the Navy, wrote the Life of Lord Exmouth and the poem The Voyage.

== Career ==
Osler first rose to national prominence by helping to secure the conviction of Louis Riel on charges of treason following the North-West Rebellion of 1885. He subsequently represented the government of Canada in arbitrations with the Canadian Pacific Railway arising from construction contracts carried out by contractor Andrew Onderdonk. He is also noted for his role as a prosecutor in numerous lurid murder trials, including that of Reginald Birchall.

Osler is known for founding the law firm of McCarthy, Osler, Hoskin & Creelman (later known as McCarthy, Osler, Hoskin & Harcourt) with D'Alton McCarthy, the predecessor to today's firm Osler, Hoskin & Harcourt. Approximately 15 years after D'Alton McCarthy's death, his son and two nephews split from McCarthy, Osler, Hoskin & Harcourt to begin their own firm, the predecessor to the firm known today as McCarthy Tétrault.
