= Zhong Lun Law Firm =

Chinese multinational law firm

Zhong Lun Law Firm 中伦律师事务所
- Headquarters: Beijing, China
- No. of offices: 18
- No. of lawyers: Over 1,600
- Major practice areas: General practice
- Key people: Anthony Zhao (Managing Partner)
- Revenue: US$654 million (2022)
- Date founded: 1993 (Beijing)
- Website: zhonglun.com

Zhong Lun Law Firm (Chinese: 中伦律师事务所; pinyin: Zhōnglún Lǜshī Shìwùsuǒ) is a private-owned law firm headquartered in Beijing, China. It was founded in 1993.

As of 2020, Zhong Lun has domestic offices in Beijing, Shanghai, Shenzhen, Guangzhou, Chengdu, Wuhan, Chongqing, Qingdao, Hangzhou, Nanjing, Haikou and Hong Kong, and international offices in London, Tokyo, New York City, San Francisco, Los Angeles and Almaty. Zhong Lun is considered to be part of the "Red Circle", an informal grouping of some law firms in China.

== History ==
Zhong Lun was founded in Beijing in 1993 as a private partnership. In 1996, it merged with the Beijing-based law firm Jintong and changed its name to Zhonglun Jintong. In 2003, a group of Zhonglun Jintong partners left to set up a new firm named Zhonglun W&D. Zhonglun Jintong rebranded itself as Zhong Lun in 2008.

Zhong Lun's office in Wuhan was opened in January 2010. Zhong Lun's office in Hong Kong was opened in February 2010, in an association with the Hong Kong–based law firm Roger Ho & Co. In 2011 Zhong Lun's Hong Kong office merged with the Hong Kong–based law firm Boughton Peterson Yang Anderson. Zhong Lun's opened an office in London in February 2012 following the recruitment of the entire London staff of Zhonglun W&D. From 2011 to 2013, Katie Zacharia worked at Zhong Lun as an associate on the international practice team.

In April 2013, Zhong Lun opened a New York Office in Midtown Manhattan, with Ta-kuang (T.K.) Chang and Philip Xuan Zhang as founding partners.

== See also ==
- Legal History of China
- Chinese law
- Red Circle (law firms)
