= Macfarlanes =

British law firm

Macfarlanes LLP
- Headquarters: London, United Kingdom
- No. of offices: Three (London, Brussels) and New York City)
- No. of lawyers: Approximately 600
- No. of employees: Approximately 940
- Major practice areas: General practice
- Key people: Damien Crossley (Senior Partner); Luke Powell (Managing Partner); Katherine Milliken (Chief Operating Officer)
- Revenue: £389.5 million (2025/26)
- Profit per equity partner: £3.1 million (2025/26)
- Date founded: 1875 (London)
- Company type: Limited liability partnership
- Website: www.macfarlanes.com

Macfarlanes LLP is a London-based law firm and a member of the UK's "Silver Circle" of elite law firms.

The firm is ranked as the UK's most profitable major law firm by profit margin and serves a global client base across Private Capital, M&A, Private Wealth, and Disputes.

Macfarlanes is regarded, alongside Slaughter and May, as one of the City’s "blue-blood" law firms, known for its traditional old-school image and formal culture with a focus on high-end corporate work, as opposed to the rapid international expansion that has characterised much of the London legal market.

== History ==
Macfarlanes was founded in the City of London in 1875 by George Watson Neish. In 1894 Neish was joined in partnership by John Embleton Macfarlane and the firm moved to premises in Watling Street. The firm's offices suffered bomb damage during the Second World War. In 1958, the firm moved to a new office, Dowgate Hill House. In 1962, the firm adopted its current name Macfarlanes, named after then-senior partner Craig Macfarlane. The firm has grown organically over the years to its current size and has never merged.

Vanni Treves was the firm's senior partner from 1987 to 1999. Macfarlanes converted to a limited liability partnership in May 2008.

In September 2010, Macfarlanes advised Four Seasons Health Care, the largest UK-based care home group, on the restructuring of its £1.6 billion debt facilities. In October 2010 the firm announced that it would be introducing a new senior solicitor level from early 2011. In July 2012 Macfarlanes advised Stanhope, backed by Mitsui Fudosan UK and the Alberta Investment Management Corporation, on its purchase of the BBC Television Centre.

In January 2012, Macfarlanes was joined by a nine-strong team from the boutique specialist hedge fund law firm, D Harris & Co International Limited, to complement the firm's existing hedge funds practice.

In September 2013, Macfarlanes advised Verizon Communications on its acquisition of Vodafone's 45 per cent interest in Verizon Wireless for $130 billion, one of the biggest deals in corporate history.

In July 2026, Macfarlanes advised Ares on the acquisition of French football club Olympique Lyonnais by US businesswoman Michele Kang, following the administration of its parent company, Eagle Football Holdings.

Macfarlanes is among the firms operating a 'pass-first time' policy for training contract students sitting the SQE.

== Main practice areas ==
Macfarlanes' main practice areas are:

- Antitrust/competition
- Commercial, brands, IP and IT
- Construction and engineering
- Corporate and M&A
- Derivatives and trading
- Employment
- Finance
- Financial services regulation
- Insurance
- Investment management
- Lawtech
- Litigation and dispute resolution
- Pensions and pensions de-risking
- Private capital solutions
- Private client
- Private equity
- Public policy
- Real estate
- Restructuring and insolvency
- Reward
- Tax

== List of senior partners ==
- Herbert James (1984–1987)
- Vanni Treves (1987–1999)
- Robert Sutton (1999–2008)
- Charles Martin (2008–2020)
- Sebastian Prichard Jones (2020–2026)
- Damien Crossley (2026–present)

== Notable alumni ==
Notable alumni of Macfarlanes include:

- David Gauke, Conservative MP and former Lord Chancellor and Secretary of State for Justice
- Sir David Tang, noted socialite (joined as a trainee solicitor, but left before completing his training contract)
