= MinterEllison =

Australian law firm

- Industry: Professional services
- Founded: 1827; 199 years ago
- Headquarters: Australia
- Key people: Virginia Briggs, Chief Executive Officer
- Services: Capital Markets and Corporate; Consulting Solutions; Infrastructure, Construction and Property; Risk, Regulatory, Insurance and Controversy
- Revenue: ▲AUD$824.5 million (2024)
- Number of employees: 2,402, including 248 partners (2022)
- Website: minterellison.com

MinterEllison is a multinational law firm, and professional services firm, based in Australia. The firm has thirteen offices and operates in five countries. By number of lawyers it is the largest law firm in Australia.

== History ==
MinterEllison is considered a leading law firm, known as one of the Big Six law firms in Australia.

The firm's origins trace back to Minter, Simpson & Co, founded in 1827, and Perkins, Stevenson & Linton, founded in 1853. Its first international office was London in 1974. Its ties to China began in the 1980s.

In 1984 Minter, Simpson and Co and Perkins, Stevenson & Linton merged to form Minter Simpson. In 1986, Ellison Hewison & Whitehead merged with Gillotts and with Minter Simpson to become Minter Ellison. In October 1992, Minter Ellison and Morris Fletcher & Cross merged to form Minter Ellison Morris Fletcher, the fourth largest law firm in Australia.

The firm established offices in Hong Kong in 2000, Shanghai in 2001, and Beijing in 2010.

In 2015, MinterEllison moved into new premises at the Governor Macquarie Tower in Sydney and Collins Arch in Melbourne.

In March 2015, the firm dropped "lawyers" from its name. This was part of a strategy of diversification into non-legal professional services such as consulting and project management. Then Chief Executive Tony Harrington said these changes were aimed at adapting to "phenomenal change in the market... (including) increased in-house capacity at clients, and ever-consolidating larger businesses."

In April 2016, it launched an alternative cost contract service called 'Flex'. In October 2016, it announced an expansion into non-legal consulting.

The firm acquired ITNewcom, a boutique technology consulting firm on 1 July 2017.

== Operations ==
=== Pro bono ===
The firm performed 37 hours of pro bono work per employed lawyer in 2018. It provides pro bono legal assistance through bodies including Justice Connect, QPILCH, Public Interest Advocacy Centre, ACT Pro Bono Clearing House and the Law Society of Western Australia. It participates in the New South Wales Expert Advice Exchange, and a number of social enterprises including the Mwembe Foundation, the FOCUS women's leadership program and the Third Link Growth Fund.

Pro bono work at Australian firms is done for reasons of goodwill, marketing, and to maintain eligibility for tenders of work on the Commonwealth panel. The firm exceeds its panel requirements for pro bono work.

== Recognition ==
Recent awards won by MinterEllison include:

- WGEA Employer of Choice for Gender Equality (for the past 14 years)
- ITR Asia Awards 2018
  - Australia Tax Disputes & Litigation Firm of the Year
  - Australia Transfer Pricing Firm of the Year
  - Global Executive Mobility Tax Team of the Year in Asia
- Financial Times
  - Innovation in Legal Expertise 2018
  - Innovation in Use of Technology' 2015

== Significant matters ==
The firm has worked on the long-term leasing of the ports of Brisbane, Darwin, Newcastle, Botany and Kembla, and, most recently in 2016 the Port of Melbourne which was leased for 50 years for $9.7 billion; the A$1.14 billion joint takeover of Aquila Resources Limited by Boasteel Resources Australia Pty Ltd and Aurizon Operations Limited; and the sale by Lloyds Banking Group plc of its Australian asset finance business, Capital Finance Australia Ltd (CFAL), and its corporate loan portfolio, BOS International Australia Ltd (BOSI), to Westpac Banking Corporation for approximately A$1.55 billion in total.

== See also ==
- List of oldest companies in Australia
