= Allens (law firm) =

Australian commercial law firm

- Headquarters: Sydney, Australia
- No. of offices: 8
- Major practice areas: Corporate and commercial
- Key people: Richard Spurio (Managing Partner); Fiona Crosbie (Chair of Partners)
- Date founded: 1822; 204 years ago
- Company type: Partnership
- Website: www.allens.com.au

Allens is an international commercial law firm that operates in the Asia-Pacific region.

The firm is one of the largest in the Asia-Pacific region and has many high-profile political, judicial and corporate alumni.

It is in an alliance with the UK-headquartered Magic Circle law firm Linklaters, but is independently owned by its partners.

== Operations ==
Allens has 149 partners and 1,200 personnel. Since 1 May 2012, the firm has operated in association with Linklaters, one of the law firms in the UK referred to as the "Magic Circle". Allens also comprises a separate patent attorney firm, Allens Patent & Trade Mark Attorneys.

In May 2024, Allens had offices in Brisbane, Hanoi, Ho Chi Minh City, Melbourne, Perth, Port Moresby, Singapore and Sydney. Through its integrated alliance with Linklaters, Allens' network extends to offices in Abu Dhabi, Africa, Belgium, Brazil, China, Dubai, France, Germany, Hong Kong, Indonesia, Italy, Japan, Korea, Latin America, Luxembourg, Netherlands, Poland, Portugal, Spain, Sweden, Thailand, Turkey, Ukraine, United Kingdom and United States.

== Clients ==
Allens has client relationships stretching back over decades and, in the case of Westpac, over 160 years. In the early years of large firm legal practice in Australia, Allens was also able to cement relationships with other leading Australian businesses, including with Sir Frank Packer's Consolidated Press Holdings, later continuing the relationship with his son, Kerry Packer's Nine Network Holdings. Allens is also known to act for 55 of the world's top 100 companies by market capitalisation, including for News Corporation in Australia.

== History ==
=== Origins ===
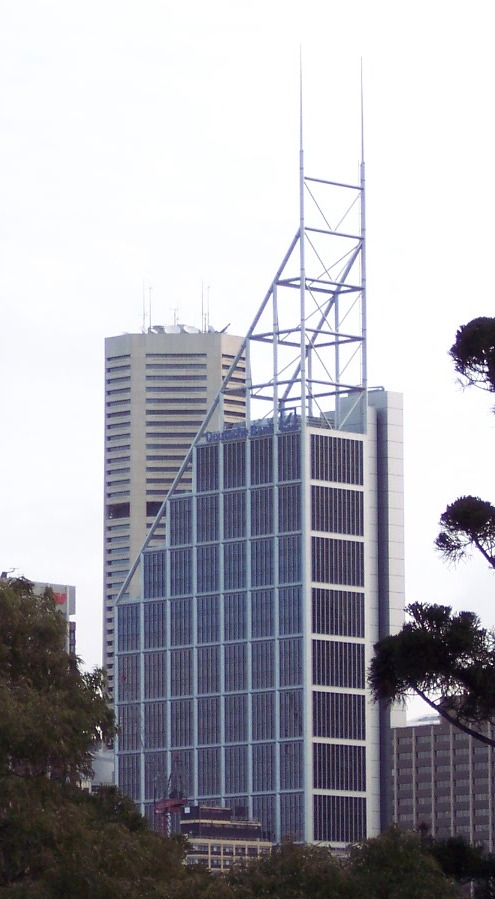
Deutsche Bank Place, Allens' Sydney office

One of Allens' predecessor firms is Allen Allen & Hemsley, founded in 1822 by George Allen. This makes Allens the longest continuous legal partnership in Australia.

The other major predecessor firm of Allens is Arthur Robinson & Co., which began trading in Melbourne, Victoria on 11 May 1914, just prior to the outbreak of World War I.

=== 20th century ===
By the early 1920s Allens had gained a reputation as Australia's preeminent law firm for establishment interests, with many high-profile and wealthy clients.

The firm acted for the Australian banks in the Bank Nationalisation Case, and for the Australian Bankers' Association in relation to the Whitlam Labour Government loans scandal.

Former Managing Partner Sir Norman Lethbridge Cowper is credited with developing Allens into one of Asia's leading law firms.

In 1984, Arthur Robinson & Co. merged with Hedderwick Fookes & Alston to form Arthur Robinson & Hedderwicks.

=== 21st century ===
Allens Arthur Robinson was formed on 1 July 2001 by merger of the Melbourne-headquartered Arthur Robinson & Hedderwicks (ARH) and Sydney-headquartered Allen Allen & Hemsley (AAH). This created one of the largest law firms in the Asia Pacific. The firms had been associated for 15 years prior to the merger through the Allens Arthur Robinson Group alliance.

Allens dropped the "Arthur Robinson" part of its name on 1 May 2012. From that date, Allens began operating in an exclusive integrated alliance with the Magic Circle law firm Linklaters, each firm remaining financially independent. The firms operate two joint ventures in Asia.

The firm has an arrangement with Widyawan & Partners for its Indonesian operations.

== Controversies ==
In the early 1990s, a controversy arose when Adrian Powles, a former partner in the London office, was discovered to have secretly accessed a client's trust account to fund a gambling addiction. A Sydney journalist, Valerie Lawson, published a book in 1995 entitled The Allens Affair that details the Powles case and touches on much of the early history of the firm.

== Corporate art collection and involvement with the arts ==
The firm has a large collection of Australian contemporary art. Included within its collection are works by Rosalie Gascoigne, David Aspden, Emily Kame Kngwarreye, Dale Frank and Ildiko Kovaks. There are over 1,500 works in its offices across Australia and Asia.

The firm provides pro bono support to the Arts Law Centre of Australia, and is an ongoing patron. The firm acted on behalf of Angus & Robertson in an obscenity trial brought for selling Philip Roth's novel Portnoy's Complaint.

== Notable alumni ==
The following persons once worked at Allens:

- George Allen, founder of the law firm and politician.
- Sir George Wigram Allen, son of George Allen and politician.
- Sir William McMahon, 20th Prime Minister of Australia.
- Michelle Gordon, High Court judge.
- William Gummow AC, High Court judge.
- Patrick Keane, High Court judge.
- David Marr, journalist and author.
- James Wolfensohn, president of the World Bank.
- Michelle Guthrie, Australian Broadcasting Corporation managing director.
- Sir Norman Lethbridge Cowper, involved in the founding of the United Australia Party.
- Ian Renard, Chancellor of the University of Melbourne.
- Andrew O'Keefe, former TV presenter of Deal or No Deal and Weekend Sunrise
- Geoffrey Robertson QC, prominent human rights barrister.
- The Most Reverend Greg Homeming OCD, Sixth Bishop of Lismore

== See also ==
- List of oldest companies in Australia
