= A&O Shearman =

Multinational law firm

Allen Overy Shearman Sterling LLP
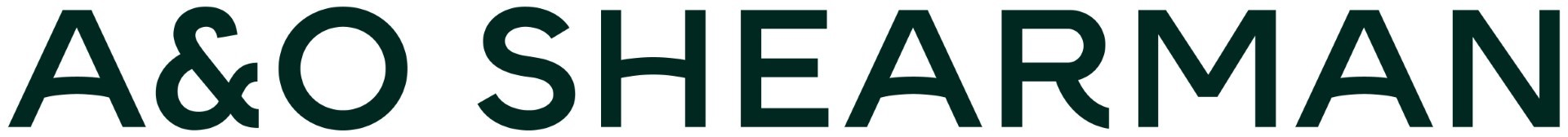
- No. of offices: Over 48 worldwide
- No. of lawyers: Approximately 4,000
- Major practice areas: General practice
- Date founded: 1 May 2024; 2 years ago by merger
- Company type: Limited liability partnership
- Website: aoshearman.com

Allen Overy Shearman Sterling LLP (commonly A&O Shearman) is a multinational law firm. The firm was formed as a result of a merger between Magic Circle firm Allen & Overy and white shoe firm Shearman & Sterling, creating a firm estimated to have nearly 4,000 attorneys across 49 offices with a combined revenue of $3.4 billion, making it the third biggest law firm in the world.

== History ==
The terms of the merger between Magic Circle firm Allen & Overy and white shoe firm Shearman & Sterling were announced on 21 May 2023 and approved on 13 October 2023 by more than 99% of partners from both firms. The merger was completed on 1 May 2024, making it the fourth-largest law firm in the world. Khalid Garousha was elected as senior partner and Hervé Ekué was elected as managing partner of A&O Shearman following the merger.

In September 2024, A&O Shearman announced that they would shut down their South African offices and instead support its Sub-Saharan clients from its other global offices. In January 2025, 57 former members of A&O Shearman in South Africa, including 14 partners, joined Bowmans.

=== Agreement to support Trump administration (2025) ===
In April 2025, during the targeting of law firms and lawyers under the second Trump administration, A&O Shearman in the United States agreed to a deal with President Donald Trump, committing to provide $125 million in pro bono legal work on behalf of causes endorsed by Trump. In July 2026, the Department of Justice subpoenaed A&O Shearman in an investigation of the deal.
