= Hogan Lovells Cadwalader =

International law firm

- Headquarters: Atlantic House, Holborn Viaduct, London, UK; Columbia Square, 555 Thirteenth Street, Washington, D.C., US; 200 Liberty Street, New York City, US
- No. of attorneys: Approximately 3,100-3,200 Lawyers
- Major practice areas: General practice
- Revenue: About US$3.6 billion (2026)
- Date founded: 2026 (Hogan Lovells Cadwalader); 2010 (Hogan Lovells); 1904 (Hogan & Hartson); 1899 (Lovells); 1792 (Cadwalader, Wickersham & Taft)
- Company type: Limited liability partnership
- Website: https://www.hlc.com

Hogan Lovells Cadwalader is an international law firm formed through the merger of Hogan Lovells and Cadwalader, Wickersham & Taft. The merger took effect on 1 July 2026 after approval by the partnerships of both firms. The combination created a law firm with approximately 3,100 to 3,200 lawyers and annual revenue of about US$3.6 billion, making it one of the largest law firms in the world by revenue and headcount.

The firm combines Hogan Lovells, a transatlantic law firm formed in 2010 from Hogan & Hartson and Lovells, with Cadwalader, Wickersham & Taft, a New York law firm founded in 1792 and described as Wall Street’s oldest law firm.

== History ==
=== Predecessor firms ===
Hogan Lovells was formed in 2010 by the merger of Hogan & Hartson, a Washington, D.C.-based firm, and Lovells, a London-based firm. The firm developed as a transatlantic legal practice with offices across the Americas, Europe, the Middle East, Africa and Asia-Pacific.

Cadwalader, Wickersham & Taft traced its origins to a New York legal practice founded in 1792. It became associated with Wall Street finance and was known before the merger for work in finance, structured products, capital markets and fund finance.

=== Merger ===
Hogan Lovells and Cadwalader announced their intention to combine in December 2025. Bloomberg Law reported that the proposed merger would be the largest law firm combination in history, with expected revenue of about US$3.6 billion and a position among the five largest firms globally by revenue.

The merger was approved by partners at both firms in April 2026. Reuters reported that the combined firm would be named Hogan Lovells Cadwalader, would have about 3,100 lawyers, and would retain major offices in Washington, D.C., New York, London and Charlotte.

The combination went live on 1 July 2026. The Global Legal Post described the launch as completing a US$3.9 billion merger and noted that the firms characterised it as the largest law firm merger in history. Bloomberg Law reported that the new firm planned to use the merger to expand its New York presence, where it would have more than 300 lawyers.

== Practice areas ==
Hogan Lovells Cadwalader advises clients across corporate, finance, disputes, regulatory, intellectual property and transactional matters.

FN London described the strategic rationale of the merger as strengthening the combined firm’s position in the New York-London legal and financial markets, particularly in finance, private capital, energy, technology and life sciences.

== Offices ==
At launch, Hogan Lovells Cadwalader had offices across the Americas, Europe, the Middle East, Africa and Asia-Pacific. Reuters identified Washington, D.C., New York, London and Charlotte as major office locations of the combined firm.

The merger significantly expanded Hogan Lovells’ presence in New York. Bloomberg Law reported that the combined firm would have more than 300 lawyers in New York and that firm leadership intended further expansion in that market.

== Management ==
Hogan Lovells chief executive Miguel Zaldivar became chief executive of Hogan Lovells Cadwalader. Cadwalader co-managing partners Wesley Misson and Patrick Quinn took senior leadership roles in the combined firm, with Misson leading the finance practice and Quinn focusing on client and practice integration.

== Significance ==
The merger formed one of the largest global law firms and was part of a wider period of consolidation among international law firms. Reuters reported that the deal followed other major legal industry combinations, while Financial News described the merger as part of pressure on large UK and transatlantic firms to strengthen their position in the United States.

The merger also raised questions about Cadwalader’s earlier commitment to provide pro bono legal services in connection with the Trump administration’s actions toward law firms. Bloomberg Law reported before the merger that Hogan Lovells could inherit uncertainty over that commitment through the combination.

== See also ==
- Hogan Lovells
- Cadwalader, Wickersham & Taft
- List of largest law firms by revenue
- List of largest United States-based law firms by head count
- Hogan Lovells Professor of Law and Finance, a position at the University of Oxford
