= Black v Law Society of Alberta =

- Supreme Court of Canada

Hearing: March 22 and 23, 1988 Judgment: April 20, 1989
- Full case name: The Law Society of Alberta v. Robert G. Black, G. Patrick H. Vernon, Basil R. Cheeseman, L. Thomas Forbes, James C. McCartney, Douglas S. Ewens, D. Murray Paton, Richard A. Shaw, Edward P. Kerwin, G. Blair Cowper-Smith and Peter D. Quinn carrying on the practice of law under the firm name of Black & Company
- Citations: [1989] 1 S.C.R. 591
- Docket No.: 19889
- Prior history: Judgment against the Law Society of Alberta in the Court of Appeal for Alberta.
- Ruling: Appeal dismissed

Holding
- A law preventing a person from earning a living due to a provincial boundary may infringe their mobility rights under Section 6(2) of the Canadian Charter of Rights and Freedoms, even if the person is not physically moving to the other province.

Court membership
- Chief Justice: Brian Dickson; Puisne Justices: Jean Beetz, Willard Estey, William McIntyre, Antonio Lamer, Bertha Wilson, Gerald Le Dain, Gérard La Forest, Claire L'Heureux-Dubé

Reasons given
- Majority: La Forest J., joined by Dickson C.J. and Wilson J.
- Concur/dissent: McIntyre J., joined by L'Heureux-Dubé J.
- Beetz, Estey, Lamer, and Le Dain JJ. took no part in the consideration or decision of the case.

Black v Law Society of Alberta, [1989] 1 SCR 591 is a leading Supreme Court of Canada on the freedom of mobility and freedom of association under the Canadian Charter of Rights and Freedoms.

== Background ==
A number of lawyers from an Ontario law firm attempted to establish an office in Alberta. All the members of the Alberta office were members of the Alberta bar as well as partners in the Toronto office.

In response to this the province of Alberta amended the Alberta Law Society Act to require that members of the bar be residents of Alberta and can only be partner in a single firm.

The lawyers challenged the amendments on the basis that it violated their right to freedom of association under section 2(d) of the Charter and freedom of mobility under section 6.

== Reasons of the court ==
Justice LaForest, writing for the majority, struck down the provisions of the Law Society Act on the grounds that it violated the freedom of mobility.
