= Withers LLP =

Law firms of the United Kingdom

Withers
- Headquarters: London, United Kingdom
- No. of offices: 15
- No. of lawyers: 200+ partners
- Major practice areas: Private client Commercial; Dispute resolution
- Date founded: 1896 (London)
- Company type: Limited liability partnership
- Website: withersworldwide.com

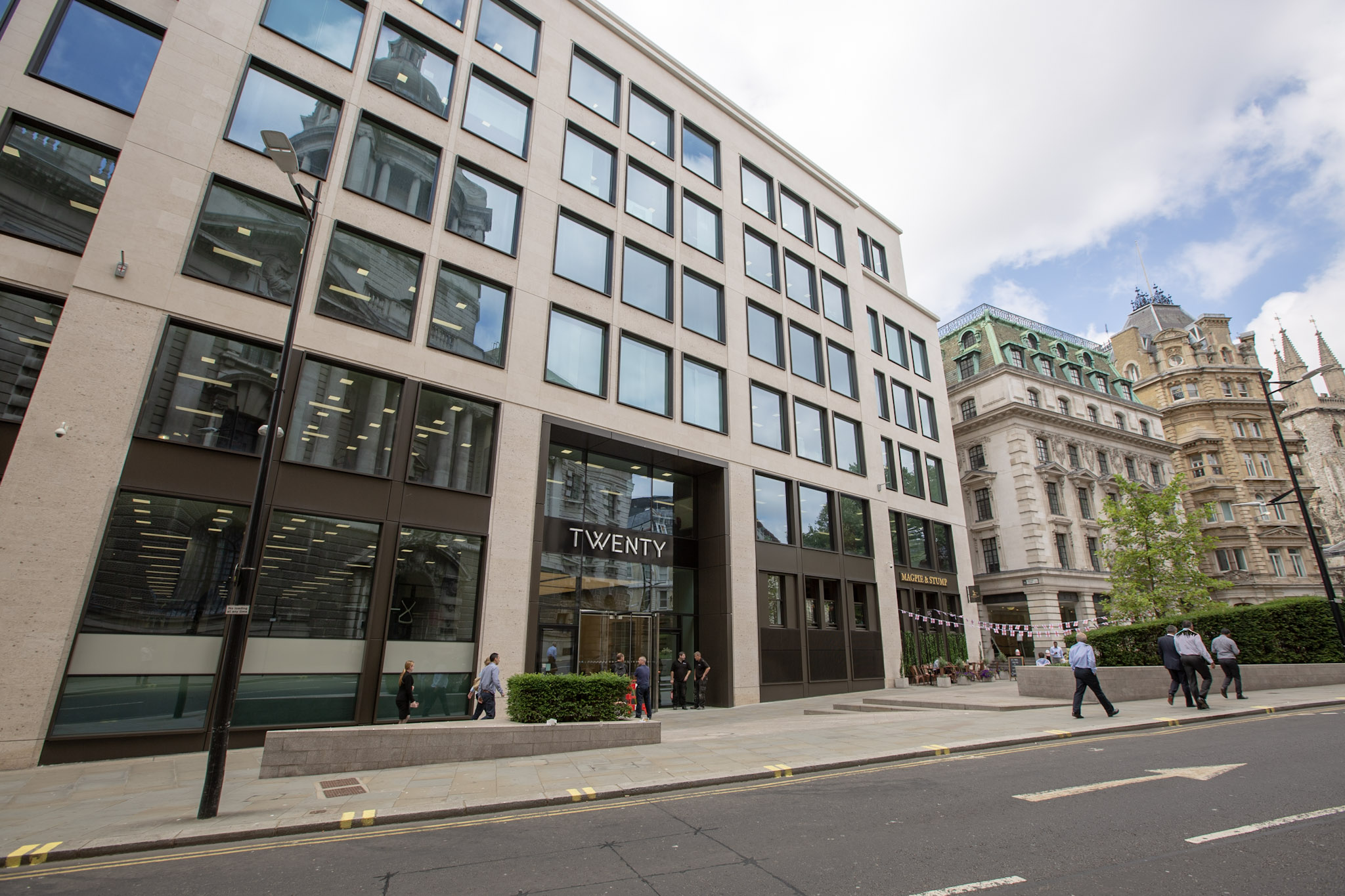
Withers 20 Old Bailey

Withers is an international law firm with offices in the United States, United Kingdom, Europe, Asia, and the Caribbean. Withers specializes in tax, trust and estate planning, as well as litigation, employment, family law, corporate transactions and other legal issues for individuals.

== History ==
One of London's oldest blue blood private client practices, Withers was founded in England in 1896. In 2002, Withers merged with the New Haven, Connecticut-based law firm Bergman, Horowitz & Reynolds to form Withers Bergman LLP in the United States and Withers LLP in the United Kingdom and the rest of the world. The firm has expanded substantially since then, merging with KhattarWong in Singapore, and opening two other offices in Asia, as well a number on the US west coast.

== Leadership ==
As of 2026, Margaret Robertson has served as CEO for nearly 25 years. On July 1, 2026 Ceri Vokes will take over as CEO. Vokes had been partner at the firm for 13 years prior to her appointment.

== Locations ==
Withers has offices in Hong Kong, Singapore, Tokyo, Geneva, London, Milan, Padua, British Virgin Islands, Greenwich, Los Angeles, New Haven, New York City, San Diego, San Francisco, and Texas.

== Rankings ==
Withers is ranked amongst the top tier of firms in Chambers and Partners High Net Worth guide and Legal 500 UK guide. The firm has also been listed by The Times as one of its Best Law Firms.

== Cox controversy ==
Former Attorney General for England and Wales Geoffrey Cox was contracted by Withers following his sacking in September 2020. By 20 November 2021 Withers were reported to have paid Cox more than £800,000 in fees in a period in which he retained his parliamentary seat of Torridge and West Devon. A video appearing to show Cox using his parliamentary office for a Zoom meeting was published by Sky News which also featured Lauren Peaty, a Senior Associate with Withers. Cox explained he could not remain part of the Zoom meeting, which also included Andrew Fahie, Premier of the British Virgin Isles.
