= Red Circle (law firms) =

Group of Chinese law firms

The Red Circle Firms (Chinese: 红圈所) is an informal term for leading law firms in China that are perceived as prestigious or high-quality, similar to the Magic Circle firms in the UK and white-shoe firms in the US.

The term was first used by The Lawyer magazine in a report in March 2014, which used the term to define eight top-tier law firms in China. The eight firms include: Commerce & Finance (通商), Global Law Office (环球), Haiwen & Partners (海问), Jingtian & Gongcheng (竞天公诚), Jun He Law Offices (君合), King & Wood (金杜), Zhong Lun (中伦), in Beijing; and Fangda (方达) in Shanghai. The list was later repeated by The Lawyer in its 2014 issue of a China-focused legal market report. Since then, it has gained wide popularity within the Chinese legal community as well as law graduates when it comes to recruitment.

Although their sizes vary greatly, the Red Circle firms have much higher average revenue per lawyer (RPL), revenue per equity partner (RPP) and profit per equity partner (PEP) compared to their top 30 rivals.

In April 2026, Law.com International published a three-part series examining the transformation of China's legal market, introducing a new term – "The China Elite" (中国精英) – to describe a group of six leading firms, explicitly framed as a successor to the "Red Circle" classification. The six firms named were King & Wood, Han Kun Law Offices (汉坤), Zhong Lun, JunHe, Fangda, and Haiwen & Partners.

== See also ==
- List of largest Chinese law firms
- Magic Circle (law firms)
- White-shoe firm
- Big Four (law firms)
