= Stephenson Harwood =

British law firm

Stephenson Harwood LLP
- Headquarters: London
- No. of offices: 10
- Offices: Al Khobar, Athens, Dubai, Hong Kong, London, Paris, Riyadh, Singapore, Shanghai, Seoul
- Major practice areas: Commercial, Data & Tech; Corporate; Dispute Resolution; Employment, Pensions & Immigration; Finance; Insurance; Intellectual Property; Maritime, Trade and Offshore; Private Wealth; Projects, Energy and Infrastructure; Real Estate; Regulatory and Investigations
- Key people: Eifion Morris (CEO)
- Revenue: £309 million (2024/25)
- Profit per equity partner: £1,000,000 (2024/25)
- Date founded: 1875
- Website: www.stephensonharwood.com

Stephenson Harwood LLP is an international law firm with over 1,500 people worldwide, including more than 230 partners. The firm is headquartered in London, United Kingdom, with 10 offices across Asia, Europe and the Middle East. In 2024/25 it achieved total revenues of £309 million, a 17% increase on the previous year, and profits per equity partner of £1M.

== History ==
In 1875, when William Harwood returned to London after practising in China, he had joined forces with Henry Stephenson and formed Harwood & Stephenson. That would become Stephenson Harwood & Tatham in 1920 when the two firms merged, a name which would remain until 1973, when it was shortened to Stephenson Harwood.

In 2002 the merger with City shipping specialist Sinclair Roche & Temperley gave it a Shanghai office.

In 2011, in the largest Boeing deal in aviation history, the firm advised Lion Air on purchasing 230 model 737 aircraft worth US$21.7 billion. The signing was witnessed by the American chief executive.

The firm converted to LLP status in March 2012 and opened an office in Dubai, its first in the Middle East, in December 2012.

Stephenson Harwood Singapore converted to LLP in 2013 and Virtus Law and Stephenson Harwood announced a formal law alliance in 2014. The firm also opened an office in Seoul that year.

Eifion Morris was appointed CEO in 2019.

In 2025, Stephenson Harwood announced that they would be opening offices in Riyadh and Al Kohbar, Saudi Arabia, further expanding the firm's number of offices to 10 globally.
