= Clifford Chance =

Multinational law firm headquartered in London

Coordinates: 51.5027°N 0.017°W

Clifford Chance LLP
- Headquarters: 10 Upper Bank Street, Canary Wharf, London, United Kingdom
- No. of offices: 34 offices across 23 countries
- No. of lawyers: Approx. 3,680
- Major practice areas: Banking and finance; Capital markets; Corporate and M&A; Litigation & dispute resolution; Real estate; Tax, pensions and employment
- Key people: Charles Adams (Managing Partner); Adrian Cartwright (Senior Partner)
- Revenue: £2.04 billion (US$2.79 billion) (2022–23)
- Profit per equity partner: £2 million (US$2.74 million) (2022–23)
- Date founded: 1987; 39 years ago
- Company type: Limited liability partnership
- Website: cliffordchance.com

Clifford Chance LLP is a British multinational law firm headquartered in London, England, and a member of the "Magic Circle", a group of leading London-based multinational law firms.

In 2022-2023 Clifford Chance was the third largest law firm headquartered in the UK by revenue, having in that period a total revenue of £2.04 billion (US$2.79 billion). In 2023 it ranked as the 13th largest law firm in the world measured by revenue.

== History ==
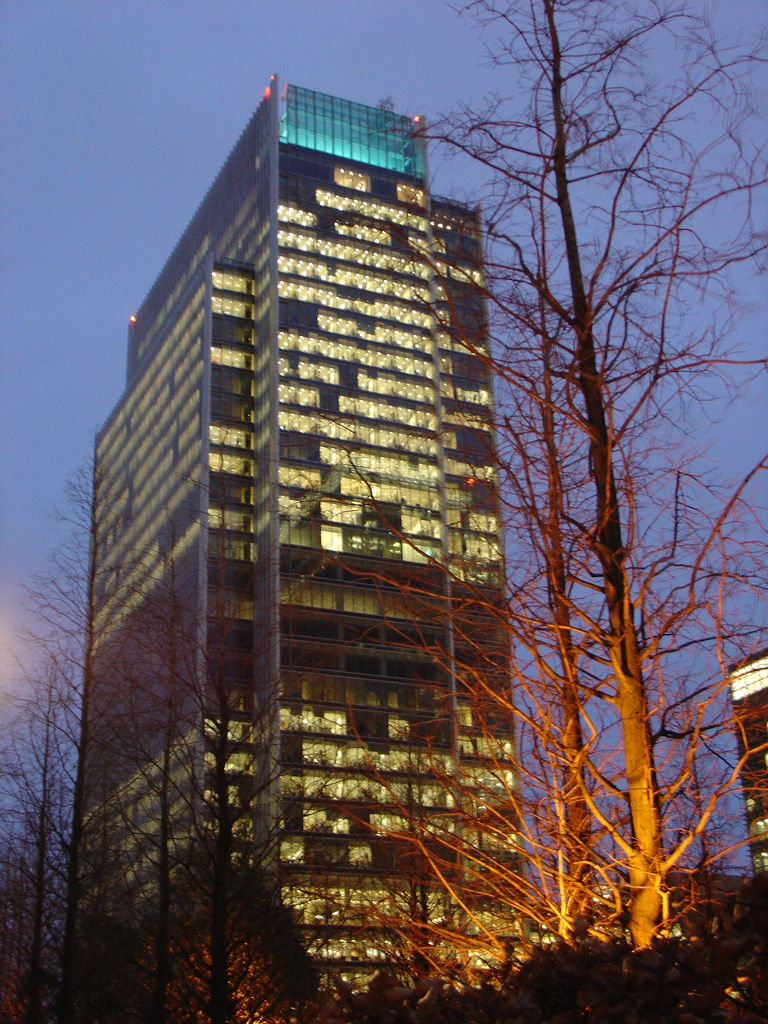
10 Upper Bank Street, Clifford Chance's headquarters in Canary Wharf, London

Clifford Chance was created by the merger in 1987 of two London-based law firms – Coward Chance and Clifford-Turner.

Coward Chance derived from a firm established in 1802 by Anthony Brown. Brown's firm advised British companies trading internationally as the empire grew.

Clifford-Turner was founded in 1900 by Harry Clifford Turner, with offices on Gresham Street, EC2. Its clients included Dunlop Rubber Company and Imperial Airways. In 1929, Clifford-Turner advised and witnessed the creation of John Lewis Partnership. After the Second World War it advised the Labour government on the nationalisation of several privately owned industries. It opened offices in Paris in 1961, Amsterdam in 1972, Madrid in 1980 and New York in 1986.

Neither Clifford-Turner nor Coward Chance had been first-rank London law firms, but their merger has since been said to have changed the shape and profile of law firms in London and globally.

Over the next decade the firm expanded its practices across Europe and Asia and more than doubled in size. In 1992 Clifford Chance became the first major non-US firm to practise US law.

=== Global expansion ===
In 1999, Clifford Chance merged with Frankfurt-based law firm Pünder, Volhard, Weber & Axster and with the 1871-established US-based firm Rogers & Wells (the use of the Pünder, Volhard, Weber & Axster and Rogers & Wells branding for their respective European and United States regional offices was discontinued in 2003). In 2002, Clifford Chance launched in California, setting up a branch with nearly 50 attorneys from the disbanding dot-com firm Brobeck, Phleger & Harrison in Los Angeles, Palo Alto, San Diego and San Francisco. With California's downturn, the firm closed its Pacific Coast operations in 2007.

Clifford Chance was one of several international law firms that developed local law practices in Japan following the easing of restrictions on foreign law firms in 2005. Clifford Chance was the highest-ranked European law firm by Japanese corporate legal departments in a December 2013 Nihon Keizai Shimbun survey.

Like other firms in the Magic Circle, the firm lost significant revenue during the late-2000s recession, with its profit dropping by 33.4% in the 2008-9 financial year. Prior to 2008, Clifford Chance's primary focus was on banks and financial sector. As part of cost cutting in response to the recession, in 2009 Clifford Chance announced plans to lay off 80 lawyers and 115 support staff in London. In addition, the firm accepted the redundancy applications of 50 fee earners in London over and above the initial 80 lawyers. In 2011, the firm moved back office tasks to its 350-employee Global Shared Service Centre, including a 60-employee Knowledge Centre in New Delhi, India as an efficiency measure.

In May 2011, Clifford Chance opened offices in Australia by merging with two M&A boutique law firms, Sydney-based Chang, Pistilli & Simmons and Perth-based Cochrane Lishman Carson Luscombe. In February 2012, Clifford Chance opened a new office in Casablanca, giving the firm's Africa practice its first permanent on the ground presence in the continent. In July 2012, Clifford Chance became the first UK firm to receive permission from South Korea's Ministry of Justice to open an office in the country.

In November 2011 it was identified as the largest supplier to the City of London Corporation, having received over £9m in fees from the corporation between January and September of that year. In February 2018, following the January 2018 liquidation of construction and services business Carillion, around 60 staff at Carillion's Newcastle-based legal services arm joined Clifford Chance. On 2 May 2018, Clifford Chance announced the establishment of a delivery and innovation hub in Singapore to serve the Asia-Pacific Region.

In July 2025, the firm was ranked fourth among top foreign law firms for India-related matters by the India Business Law Journal.

=== Controversies ===
In 2002 concerns were raised after an internal memo from members of the New York office implied that working conditions tempted staff to "pad out" billing hours. Staff are required to bill 2,420 hours a year.

In 2020, the Clifford Chance office in Frankfurt, Germany, was searched as part of an investigation into the tax dealings of ABN AMRO Bank N.V.

In March and April 2024, the Polish office of Clifford Chance became the subject of controversy related to its role in the process of changes in public media, introduced since the end of 2023 by the new Polish authorities after the elections in October 2023.

== See also ==
- List of largest law firms by profits per partner
