= Allen & Overy =

Multinational law firm

Allen & Overy LLP
- Headquarters: One Bishops Square, London, England E1 6AD; United Kingdom
- No. of offices: over 40 worldwide in 31 countries
- No. of lawyers: Partners: Approximately 590; Associates: Approximately 2,768
- No. of employees: Approximately 5,800
- Major practice areas: General practice
- Key people: Wim Dejonghe Senior Partner; Khalid Garousha Managing Partner
- Revenue: ▲£2.1 billion (2021/2022)
- Profit per equity partner: ▲£1.82 million (2021/2022)
- Date founded: 1 January 1930; 96 years ago
- Founder: George Allen; Thomas Overy
- Company type: Limited liability partnership
- Dissolved: 30 April 2024
- Website: www.allenovery.com

Allen & Overy LLP was a British multinational law firm headquartered in London, England. The firm had 590 partners and over 5,800 employees worldwide. In 2023 A&O reported an increase in revenue to GBP2.1 billion and was the second largest law firm headquartered in the UK by revenue. In 2024 it merged with Shearman & Sterling to form A&O Shearman.

== History ==
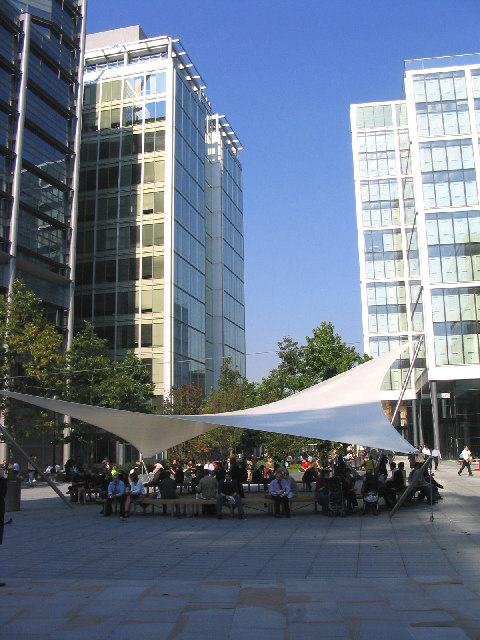
Bishops Square, Spitalfields

Allen & Overy was founded in London on 1 January 1930 by George Allen and Thomas Overy, formerly partners at Roney & Co. The main purpose was to build a commercial practice. The firm's reputation was made as a result of George Allen's role as adviser to King Edward VIII during the abdication crisis of 1936. By the time World War II broke out in 1939, Allen & Overy had firmly established itself as a leading City law firm.

Allen & Overy was involved in many developments in the legal field. Such work has included advising on the first hostile takeover in the City of London and acting for S. G. Warburg & Co. The firm arranged the first Eurobond (issued by Italian motorway group Autostrada) in the 1960s. The Eurobond transaction significantly diversified Allen & Overy's practice from a purely commercial into commercial and financial firm. Through the 1970s the firm's finance and corporate practice grew in the UK and internationally.

In 1996, non-UK clients contributed more to Allen & Overy's revenue than UK clients. In 1998, non-UK clients contributed two-thirds of revenue.

In 1999, Allen & Overy hired a team of banking and finance lawyers in Paris from its then ally, Gide Loyrette Nouel.

In 2000, Allen & Overy merged with part of the Amsterdam, Brussels and Luxembourg offices of Loeff Claeys Verbeke.

In May 2004, the worldwide partnership of Allen & Overy converted to a limited liability partnership, Allen & Overy LLP, which works together with associated undertakings in some jurisdictions to form a worldwide legal practice. In July 2008 Allen & Overy broke the £1 billion turnover mark, and, for the first time, over half of its turnover was generated outside London.

In 2009, following the 2008 financial crisis, Allen & Overy completed a redundancy programme which saw 400 partners and staff lose their jobs globally. As well as cutting 47 partners, the firm cut around 200 fee-earners and 200 members of support staff, half of which were based in London. Allen & Overy de-equitised a further 35 partners. In the same year, Allen & Overy demerged its private client department, which became Maurice Turnor Gardner LLP.

In 2014, Allen & Overy became the first Magic Circle firm to establish an office in sub-Saharan Africa when it opened an office in Johannesburg, South Africa.

A 2021 assessment singled out Allen & Overy among law firms as engaging in the most transactional work for fossil fuel companies.

On 21 May 2023 it was announced that Allen & Overy had agreed to terms in a merger with AMLaw100 member Shearman & Sterling, creating A&O Shearman over 4,000 attorneys across 48 offices with a combined revenue of $3.4bn. On 13 October 2023, the deal was approved by more than 99% of partners from both firms.

== Offices ==
Allen & Overy had over 40 offices in 31 countries across Africa, Asia Pacific, Europe, North America, Latin America and the Middle East.

== Diversity and inclusion ==
In 2018, the firm faced criticism over diversity and gender pay gap

- Gender. In 2010, Allen & Overy announced that it was offering full equity partners the option to work part-time. The move was hailed as a "watershed moment" for the legal sector. It is believed to be the first scheme of its kind by any major international law firm.
- LGBT+. Allen & Overy's LGBT+ network, A&Out, which was launched in 2016, supports its members by hosting a variety of events that aim to raise awareness of LGBT issues, and to allow members to network. Allen & Overy was ranked in the top 100 of the Stonewall Workplace Equality Index 2018, an audit of workplace culture for LGBT+ staff in the UK. In 2017, Allen and Overy advised Stonewall on the Alan Turing law on a pro bono basis. The Alan Turing law is an informal term for the law in the United Kingdom, contained in the Policing and Crime Act 2017, which serves as an amnesty law to pardon men who were cautioned or convicted under historical legislation that outlawed homosexual acts.

== Leadership ==
The table below sets out a history of Allen & Overy's leadership:

Election	Managing Partner	Senior Partner
1994	John Rink	Bill Tudor John
1999	John Rink	Guy Beringer
2003	David Morley	Guy Beringer
2008	Wim Dejonghe	David Morley
2012	Wim Dejonghe	David Morley
2016	Andrew Ballheimer	Wim Dejonghe
2020	Gareth Price	Wim Dejonghe

== Notable alumni ==
Some of the firm's notable alumni include:

=== Academia ===
- John Dewar – UK law professor and the Vice-Chancellor of La Trobe University.
- Marike Paulsson – Director of the University of Miami's School of Law International Arbitration Institute.

=== Arts ===
- Nick Laird – Northern Irish novelist and poet.

=== Business ===
- Steuart Walton – American heir, attorney, pilot, businessman and philanthropist.

=== Politics and government ===
- Annagrazia Calabria – Italian politician.
- Ferdinand Grapperhaus – Dutch politician and Minister of Justice and Security.
- Heath Tarbert – Assistant Secretary of the Treasury for International Markets and Investment Policy.
- Sir Christopher Walford – a British lawyer and politician. He was the 667th Lord Mayor of London, and the seventh solicitor since records began in 1730 to become Lord Mayor. He also became the fifth person in A&O's history to receive a knighthood.
- David Wootton – British lawyer and politician. He was the 684th Lord Mayor of London, from 2011 to 2012, and Alderman of the Ward of Langbourn.
