= Norton Rose Fulbright =

Law firm

- No. of lawyers: 3000+
- Date founded: 1794
- Website: nortonrosefulbright.com

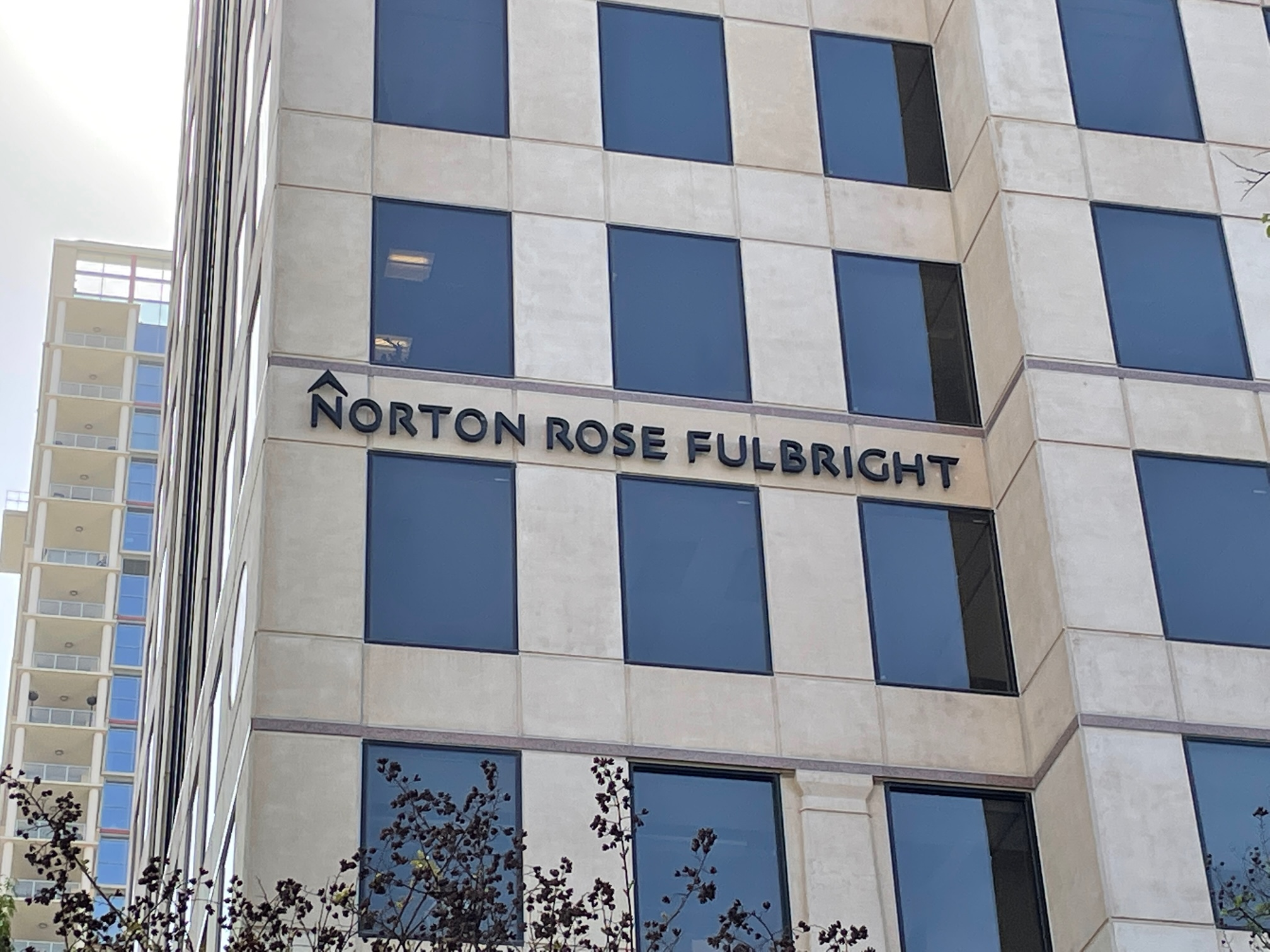
The Norton Rose Fulbright offices in Austin, Texas

Norton Rose Fulbright (NRF) is a British-American business law firm. It is the 13th-largest by headcount and 21st by revenue, with revenues of more than $2 billion.

== History ==
The British law firm Norton Rose was established by Robert Charsley in 1794 and expanded across Asia, Europe and the Middle East in the 1990s.

In 2013, Norton Rose merged with American law firm Fulbright & Jaworski, forming Norton Rose Fulbright.

In June 2017, the firm again merged, absorbing New York City law firm Chadbourne & Parke.

In March 2026, Norton Rose exited South Africa, with its former office becoming an independent law firm, Deneys.

== Criticism ==
In August 2018, the High Court of Justice in London criticized Norton Rose for unfair and misleading presentation in a case involving Fundo Soberano de Angola: "The breaches of duty are sufficiently serious and culpable to warrant discharging the WFO and not granting fresh relief, irrespective of the other grounds of challenge".
