= The Lawyer =

British legal magazine

- Editor: Catrin Griffiths
- Publisher: Legal Benchmarking Group
- Founded: 1987; 39 years ago
- Company: Legal Benchmarking Group
- Country: United Kingdom
- Based in: London and New York
- Language: English
- Website: www.thelawyer.com
- ISSN: 0953-7902

The Lawyer is a legal business information product for law firm leaders, commercial lawyers, barristers and in-house counsel. Its editorial operations are spread across New York and London.

== History and profile ==
The Lawyer was launched in 1987 by Centaur Media plc. It published a once-weekly magazine for 30 years until May 2017, when the frequency changed to monthly.

The publication was acquired by Legal Benchmarking Group in 2025.

As well as the legal news and analysis website TheLawyer.com, The Lawyer also publishes market data and analysis reports. These include the transatlantic Global Elite, a client relationship analysis of legal practices across the New York-London business corridor. In 2025, the inaugural Global Elite report focused on private capital; the second, in 2026, focused on strategic M&A.

Another example is Litigation Tracker, which launched in 2019 and publishes litigation news and analysis, and maintains a searchable database of case and claims data from 15 UK high courts. The Lawyer's spin-off online brand for students and aspiring lawyers was called Lawyer 2B. Most content on the news website TheLawyer.com is paywalled, requiring a personal or corporate subscription to access.

== Editors ==
The Lawyer has had five editors since it was founded.

Date	Editor
1987-1991	Lindsey Greig
1991-1995	Fennell Betson
1995-1998	Mary Heaney
1998-2000	Sean Brierley
2000-	Catrin Griffiths
