= List of largest Europe-based law firms by revenue =

This is a list of the largest Europe-based law firms by revenues generated solely in Europe in 2005.

1. Dentons, >€1,500.00 million – (Swiss verein)
2. CMS Derks Star Busmann, €1,426.00M – (EU)
3. Freshfields Bruckhaus Deringer, €1,052.36M – International (UK);
4. Clifford Chance, €980.14M – International (UK);
5. Linklaters, €912.64M – International (UK);
6. Allen & Overy, €843.07M – International (UK);
7. Lovells, €514.98M – International (UK);
8. Eversheds Sutherland, €436.57M – International (UK);
9. Baker McKenzie, €421.57M – International (United States);
10. DLA Piper, €387.34M – International (UK and US);
11. Slaughter & May, €328.99M – London (UK);
12. Herbert Smith, €322.49M – International (UK);
13. White & Case, €285.61M – International (US);
14. Ashurst, €284.46M – International (UK);
15. Norton Rose, €262.35M – International (UK);
16. Uría Menéndez, €252M – International (Spain);
17. Fidal, €250.00M – French National (France);
18. CMS Cameron McKenna, €238.03M – International (UK);
19. Simmons & Simmons, €228.45M – International (UK);
20. Denton Wilde Sapte, €223.89M – International (UK);
21. Shearman & Sterling, €221.25M – International (US);
22. Hammonds, €199.71M – UK National (UK);
23. Loyens & Loeff, €189.00M – Rotterdam (Netherlands);
24. Addleshaw Goddard, €184.53M – UK National (UK);
25. Garrigues, €172.10M – International (Spain);
26. Cleary Gottlieb Steen & Hamilton, €160.00M – International (US);
27. Hengeler Mueller, €157.85M – German National (Germany);
28. Berwin Leighton Paisner, €150.33M – London (UK);
29. SJ Berwin, €146.21M – London (UK);
30. Mayer Brown, €144.59M – International (US);
31. Nauta Dutilh, €140.00M – Amsterdam (Netherlands);
32. Pinsents, €135.15M – International (UK);
33. Irwin Mitchell, €134.12M – UK National (UK);
34. Latham & Watkins, €133.00M – International (US);
35. Cuatrecasas, €132.50M – International (Spain);
36. Weil, Gotshal & Manges, €130.00M – International (US);
37. Haarmann Hemmelrath, €130.00M – International (Germany);
38. Nabarro, €128.67M – London (UK);
39. Clyde & Co, €123.81M – International (UK);
40. Jones Day, €122.28M – International (US);
41. Skadden, Arps, Slate, Meagher & Flom, €122.00M – International (US);
42. Beachcroft, €120.57M – UK National (UK);
43. Gleiss Lutz, €118.50M – International (Germany);
44. Wragge & Co, €116.88M – Birmingham (UK);
45. De Brauw Blackstone Westbroek, €115.00M – International (Netherlands);
46. EY Law, €114.00M – Paris (France);
47. CMS Hasche Sigle, €110.00M – German National (Germany);
48. Barlow Lyde & Gilbert, €109.07M – London (UK);
49. Gide Loyrette Nouel, €106.14M – International (France);
50. CMS Bureau Francis Lefebvre, €104.00M – International (France);
51. Bird & Bird, €101.30M – London (UK);
52. Macfarlanes, €98.75M – London (UK);
53. Dechert, €97.81M – International (US);
54. Osborne Clarke, €95.21M – UK National (UK);
55. Salans, €95.07M – International (UK);
56. Taylor Wessing, €94.33M – International (UK);
57. Stibbe, €92.60M – Amsterdam (Netherlands);
58. Gianni, Origoni, Grippo & Partners, €91.38M – Rome (Italy);
59. Mannheimer Swartling, €90.39M – International (Sweden);
60. Nörr Stiefenhofer Lutz, €89.90M – International (Germany);
61. Sullivan & Cromwell, €88.43M – International (US);
62. Richards Butler, €88.43M – International (UK);
63. Olswang, €87.55M – London (UK);
64. Wessing, €87.25M – German National (Germany);
65. Lawrence Graham, €86.37M – London (UK);
66. Vinge, €86.00M – International (Sweden);
67. Bonelli Erede Pappalardo, €86.00M – Italian National (Italy);
68. Masons, €85.04M – International (UK);
69. Houthoff Buruma, €84.00M – Dutch National (Netherlands);
70. Shoosmiths, €80.48M – UK National (UK);
71. Landwell & Associés, €80.00M – Paris (France);
72. Chiomenti Studio Legale, €78.89M – Italian National (Italy);
73. Stephenson Harwood, €74.14M – London (UK);
74. McDermott Will & Emery, €70.85M – International (US);
75. Reynolds Porter Chamberlain, €69.57M – London (UK);
76. Field Fisher Waterhouse LLP, €69.27M – London (UK);
77. Ince & Co, €68.50M – International (UK);
78. Coudert Brothers, €68.18M – International (US);
79. Travers Smith, €66.33M – London (UK);
80. Sidley Austin, €66.13M – International (US);
81. Charles Russell LLP, €65.74M – London (UK);
82. Kromann Reumert, €65.00M – Copenhagen (Denmark);
83. Beiten Burkhardt, €65.00M – German National (Germany);
84. Bech-Bruun Dragsted Dragsted, €65.00M – Copenhagen (Denmark);
85. Taj, €63.90M – French National (France);
86. AKD Prinsen van Wijmen, €62.00M – Dutch National (Netherlands);
87. Cobbetts LLP, €61.61M – UK National (UK);
88. Holman Fenwick & Willan, €61.17M – International (UK);
89. McGrigors, €60.43M – Edinburgh (UK);
90. Hogan & Hartson, €60.43M – International (US);
91. Wilmer Hale, €59.55M – International (US);
92. Halliwells, €59.55M – Manchester (UK);
93. Hill Dickinson, €58.96M – Liverpool (UK);
94. Dundas & Wilson, €58.95M – Edinburgh (UK);
95. Walker Morris LLP, €58.22M – Leeds (UK);
96. Dickinson Dees, €58.21M – Newcastle (UK);
97. Withers, €56.30M – International (UK);
98. Maclay Murray & Spens, €56.01M – Glasgow (UK);
99. Watson, Farley & Williams, €54.53M – International (UK);
100. Bond Pearce, €54.24M – Plymouth (UK);
101. Saint-Georges Avocats, €53.80M – Paris (France).

== See also ==
- List of largest law firms by revenue
- List of largest United States-based law firms by profits per partner
- List of largest United Kingdom-based law firms by revenue
- List of largest Canada-based law firms by revenue
- List of largest Japan-based law firms by head count
- List of largest China-based law firms by revenue
