= List of largest law firms by revenue =

This is a list of the world's largest law firms based on the AmLaw Global 200 Rankings, as of 2026.

Firms marked with "(verein)" are structured as a Swiss association.

Rank	Firm	Revenue (US$)	Lawyers	Revenue per lawyer (US$)	Country with the most lawyers
1	Kirkland & Ellis	$10,556,000,000	4,145	$2,547,000	(United States) US
2	Latham & Watkins	$8,300,000,000	3,724	$2,229,000	(United States) US
3	DLA Piper	$4,583,339,000	4,737	$968,000	(United Kingdom) UK (United States) US
4	Gibson Dunn	$4,210,995,000	2,063	$2,041,000	(United States) US
5	Skadden, Arps, Slate, Meagher & Flom	$4,072,637,000	1,756	$2,319,000	(United States) US
6	Sidley Austin	$3,738,158,000	2,045	$1,828,000	(United States) US
7	Ropes & Gray	$3,737,429,000	1,481	$2,524,000	(United States) US
8	A&O Shearman	$3,693,760,000	3,000	$1,231,000	(United Kingdom) UK
9	Baker McKenzie (verein)	$3,640,303,000	4,451	$818,000	(United States) US
10	White & Case	$3,594,100,000	2,643	$1,360,000	(United States) US
11	Simpson Thacher & Bartlett	$3,552,526,000	1,761	$2,017,000	(United States) US
12	Clifford Chance	$3,429,920,000	3,247	$1,056,000	(United Kingdom) UK
13	Morgan, Lewis & Bockius	$3,361,884,000	2,043	$1,646,000	(United States) US
14	Hogan Lovells	$3,285,481,000	2,714	$1,211,000	(United States) US
15	Paul, Weiss, Rifkind, Wharton & Garrison	$3,259,804,000	1,407	$2,317,000	(United States) US
16	Linklaters	$3,258,424,000	2,995	$1,088,000	(United Kingdom) UK
17	Davis Polk & Wardwell	$3,200,000,000	1,237	$2,588,000	(United States) US
18	Freshfields	$3,143,654,000	2,741	$1,147,000	(United Kingdom) UK
19	Jones Day	$3,081,108,000	2,438	$1,264,000	(United States) US
20	McDermott Will & Schulte	$2,992,447,000	1,676	$1,786,000	(United States) US
21	Greenberg Traurig	$2,927,720,000	2,810	$1,042,000	(United States) US
22	Dentons (verein)	$2,912,740,000	5,757	$506,000	(United Kingdom) UK (United States) US
23	Norton Rose Fulbright (verein)	$2,835,166,000	3,358	$844,000	(United Kingdom) UK
24	Quinn Emanuel Urquhart & Sullivan	$2,766,854,000	1,128	$2,453,000	(United States) US
25	Goodwin Procter	$2,723,862,000	1,666	$1,635,000	(United States) US
26	Paul Hastings	$2,682,028,000	1,272	$2,109,000	(United States) US
27	King & Spalding	$2,679,028,000	1,384	$1,936,000	(United States) US
28	CMS (EEIG)	$2,456,300,000	5,160	$476,000	(European Union) EU; Germany
29	Herbert Smith Freehills Kramer	$2,407,000,000	2,686	$896,000	(United Kingdom) UK
30	Cooley	$2,373,685,000	1,304	$1,820,000	(United States) US
31	Sullivan & Cromwell	$2,276,298,000	908	$2,507,000	(United States) US
32	Holland & Knight	$2,230,236,000	1,811	$1,231,000	(United States) US
33	Mayer Brown	$2,171,000,000	1,733	$1,253,000	(United States) US
34	Milbank	$2,137,376,000	1,025	$2,085,000	(United States) US
35	Weil, Gotshal & Manges	$2,077,997,000	1,196	$1,737,000	(United States) US
36	Covington & Burling	$2,056,967,000	1,311	$1,569,000	(United States) US
37	Willkie Farr & Gallagher	$2,056,000,000	1,243	$1,654,000	(United States) US
38	Cleary Gottlieb Steen & Hamilton	$1,950,000,000	1,110	$1,757,000	(United States) US
39	Troutman Pepper Locke	$1,851,392,000	1,595	$1,161,000	(United States) US
40	Orrick, Herrington & Sutcliffe	$1,783,143,000	1,018	$1,751,000	(United States) US
41	Debevoise & Plimpton	$1,765,089,000	944	$1,870,000	(United States) US
42	Eversheds Sutherland	$1,731,000,000	2,615	$662,000	(United Kingdom) UK
43	Akin Gump Strauss Hauer & Feld	$1,705,724,000	953	$1,790,000	(United States) US
44	Wilson, Sonsini, Goodrich & Rosati	$1,647,000,000	1,056	$1,560,000	(United States) US
45	Wilmer Cutler Pickering Hale and Dorr	$1,611,277,000	983	$1,639,000	(United States) US
46	Dechert	$1,610,218,000	829	$1,942,000	(United States) US
47	Reed Smith	$1,588,416,000	1,427	$1,114,000	(United States) US
48	Proskauer Rose	$1,584,305,000	829	$1,911,000	(United States) US
49	Morrison & Foerster	$1,540,800,000	1,021	$1,509,000	(United States) US
50	Ashurst	$1,519,718,000	1,976	$769,000	Australia
51	Yingke	$1,490,087,000	19,292	$77,000	China
52	Foley & Lardner	$1,453,500,000	1,102	$1,319,000	(United States) US
53	Alston & Bird	$1,443,362,000	960	$1,504,000	(United States) US
54	Squire Patton Boggs (verein)	$1,420,800,000	1,414	$1,005,000	(United Kingdom) UK (United States) US
55	Wachtell, Lipton, Rosen & Katz	$1,385,000,000	272	$5,085,000	(United States) US
56	Sheppard, Mullin, Richter & Hampton	$1,379,175,000	1,030	$1,340,000	(United States) US
57	K&L Gates	$1,370,444,000	1,696	$808,000	(United States) US
58	Winston & Strawn	$1,369,114,000	928	$1,476,000	(United States) US
59	King & Wood Mallesons (verein)	$1,345,064,000	2,940	$458,000	China
60	Cravath, Swaine & Moore	$1,290,000,000	572	$2,255,000	(United States) US
61	Perkins Coie	$1,284,357,000	1,020	$1,259,000	(United States) US
62	Fried, Frank, Harris, Shriver & Jacobson	$1,218,200,000	740	$1,646,000	(United States) US
63	Arnold & Porter	$1,215,416,000	953	$1,275,000	(United States) US
64	McGuireWoods	$1,213,615,000	944	$1,286,000	(United States) US
65	Polsinelli	$1,210,048,000	1,117	$1,083,000	(United States) US
66	Kim & Chang	$1,196,007,000	1,440	$831,000	South Korea
67	Faegre Drinker	$1,194,471,000	1,031	$1,158,000	(United States) US
68	O’Melveny & Myers	$1,165,131,000	778	$1,498,000	(United States) US
69	Vinson & Elkins	$1,132,160,000	681	$1,662,000	(United States) US
70	BakerHostetler	$1,130,939,000	1,028	$1,100,000	(United States) US
71	Clyde & Co	$1,130,554,000	1,977	$572,000	(United Kingdom) UK
72	Nelson Mullins Riley & Scarborough	$1,048,907,000	1,040	$1,009,000	(United States) US
73	Taft Stettinius & Hollister	$1,044,000,000	1,141	$915,000	(United States) US
74	Littler Mendelson	$1,029,300,000	1,324	$777,000	(United States) US
75	Seyfarth Shaw	$990,784,000	913	$1,085,000	(United States) US
76	Dacheng Law Offices	$973,913,000	9,279	$105,000	China
77	Hunton Andrews Kurth	$960,947,000	731	$1,315,000	(United States) US
78	Slaughter and May	$949,824,000	708	$1,342,000	(United Kingdom) UK
79	Pillsbury Winthrop Shaw Pittman	$929,115,000	684	$1,373,000	(United States) US
80	Pinsent Masons	$927,530,000	1,845	$503,000	(United Kingdom) UK
81	Katten Muchin Rosenman	$912,273,000	632	$1,444,000	(United States) US
82	Bryan Cave Leighton Paisner	$912,067,000	1,025	$890,000	(United States) US
83	Simmons & Simmons	$910,248,000	1,410	$646,000	(United Kingdom) UK
84	Venable	$900,012,000	785	$1,146,000	(United States) US
85	Fenwick & West	$885,823,000	457	$1,940,000	(United States) US
86	Gordon Rees Scully Mansukhani	$882,605,000	1,515	$583,000	(United States) US
87	Fox Rothschild	$854,586,000	947	$903,000	(United States) US
88	Lewis Brisbois Bisgaard & Smith	$852,271,000	1,655	$515,000	(United States) US
89	Blank Rome	$852,258,000	692	$1,232,000	(United States) US
90	Fragomen, Del Rey, Bernsen & Loewy	$850,862,000	722	$1,178,000	(United States) US
91	Addleshaw Goddard	$849,565,000	1,645	$516,000	(United Kingdom) UK
92	Baker Botts	$843,248,000	639	$1,320,000	(United States) US
93	Womble Bond Dickinson (US) LLP	$828,047,000	1,203	$688,000	(United States) US
94	Ogletree, Deakins, Nash, Smoak & Stewart	$823,572,000	1,080	$763,000	(United States) US
95	Barnes & Thornburg	$817,716,000	776	$1,054,000	(United States) US
96	Jackson Lewis	$806,941,000	1,071	$753,000	(United States) US
97	Gowling WLG	$803,657,000	1,311	$613,000	Canada
98	Blake, Cassels & Graydon	$803,500,000	721	$1,114,000	Canada
99	Cozen O'Connor	$803,000,000	846	$950,000	(United States) US
100	Bird & Bird	$799,435,000	1,557	$513,000	(United Kingdom) UK

== See also ==
- List of largest law firms by profits per partner
- List of largest United States-based law firms
- List of largest United Kingdom-based law firms by revenue
- List of largest Canada-based law firms by revenue
- List of largest Europe-based law firms by revenue
- List of largest Japan-based law firms by head count
- List of largest China-based law firms by revenue
