= Lists of law firms =

Numerous current and former law firms are considered notable. Law firms are typically ranked by profit per partner, or at a more general level, revenue. Some private directories also assign subjective rankings to law firms, including Chambers and Partners and The Legal 500, although these are falling out of favour.

== Americas ==
- List of largest Canada-based law firms by revenue
- List of largest United States-based law firms by head count
- List of largest United States-based law firms by profits per partner

== Europe ==
- List of largest European law firms
- List of largest United Kingdom-based law firms

== Asia ==
- List of largest Chinese law firms
- List of largest Japanese law firms

== Africa ==
- Big Five (law firms) in South Africa
- List of law firms in Uganda

== Global ==
- List of largest law firms by profits per partner
