= List of largest United Kingdom–based law firms =

This is a list of the world's largest United Kingdom–based law firms by revenue in the financial year 2024. This data is based on the law firms official financial report for the 2023/24 financial year running from 1 April 2023 to 31 March 2024. The list contains the 17 law firms which generated over half a billion US dollars in this period. 16 of which are London-based and 1 headquarter in Manchester.

A few UK-based law firms have merged with another entity which may be located outside of the UK. For example, Allen & Overy (London) merged with Shearman (New York) in May 2024; the result of this is the removal of the US revenue and number of lawyers from the list to account for its UK operations. Some data from the number of lawyers at the firms are from the 2022/23 financial year, as the firms have not updated as of January 2025.

Largest United Kingdom–based law firms
Firm	Revenue (US$)	Number of practising Lawyers	Revenue per Lawyer	Headquartered
Clifford Chance	$2.810 billion	3,319	$846,641	London, England
Linklaters	$2.730 billion	3,075	$887,805	London, England
Allen & Overy	$2.690 billion	3,358	$801,073	London, England
Freshfields Bruckhaus Deringer	$2.550 billion	2,038	$1,251,227	London, England
Herbert Smith Freehills Kramer	$1.594 billion	2,299	$693,345	London, England
Ashurst LLP	$1.173 billion	1,719	$682,373	London, England
Clyde & Co	$1.043 billion	2,138	$487,839	London, England
Eversheds Sutherland	$0.915 billion	2,616	$349,770	London, England
Bryan Cave Leighton Paisner	$0.840 billion	1,275	$658,824	London, England
Slaughter and May	$0.805 billion	594	$1,355,219	London, England
Pinsent Masons	$0.793 billion	2,330	$340,343	London, England
Simmons & Simmons	$0.701 billion	974	$719,713	London, England
Bird & Bird	$0.665 billion	1,600	$415,625	London, England
Addleshaw Goddard	$0.606 billion	1,197	$506,267	London, England
Taylor Wessing	$0.587 billion	1,179	$497,880	London, England
Osborne Clarke	$0.543 billion	1,205	$450,622	London, England
DWF	$0.531 billion	1,100	$482,727	Manchester, England

This is a list of the world's largest United Kingdom–based law firms by revenue in the financial year 2022.

Global rank	Firm	Revenue (US$)	Lawyers	Revenue per lawyer (US$)
12	Allen & Overy	$2,597,910,000	2,821	$921,000
13	Clifford Chance	$2,550,900,000	2,547	$1,002,000
16	Linklaters	$2,350,490,000	2,684	$876,000
17	Freshfields Bruckhaus Deringer	$2,276,264,000	2,062	$1,104,000
24	CMS (EEIG)	$1,964,175,000	4,334	$453,000
35	Herbert Smith Freehills	$1,467,201,000	2,299	$638,000
36	Eversheds Sutherland	$1,453,516,562	2,616	$556,000
55	Ashurst	$1,087,411,000	1,719	$633,000
65	Clyde & Co.	$975,577,000	2,148	$454,000
74	Bryan Cave Leighton Paisner	$845,190,000	1,190	$710,000
81	Pinsent Masons	$749,559,000	1,728	$434,000
83	Slaughter and May	$729,889,000	594	$1,229,000
92	Simmons & Simmons	$644,529,000	973	$662,000
96	Bird & Bird	$612,365,000	1,543	$397,000
107	Addleshaw Goddard	$548,035,000	1,197	$458,000
109	Taylor Wessing	$543,087,000	1,079	$503,000
126	DWF	$470,222,000	694	$678,000
128	Osborne Clarke	$465,603,000	1,205	$386,000
129	Fieldfisher	$457,727,000	779	$588,000
147	Kennedys	$387,930,000	1,123	$345,000
150	DAC Beachcroft	$371,130,000	1,166	$318,000
152	Macfarlanes	$366,929,000	404	$909,000
154	Withers	$356,285,000	778	$458,000
158	Irwin Mitchell	$341,934,000	816	$419,000
169	Mishcon de Reya	$315,461,000	545	$579,000
186	Stephenson Harwood	$282,059,000	507	$556,000
188	HFW	$278,768,000	495	$563,000
194	Watson Farley & Williams	$266,471,000	579	$460,000

This list excludes firms with a large presence in the UK that structure their operations as a Swiss Verein. This is because these firms structurally differ from the firms listed above, especially when it comes to sharing profits. Some of these firms include DLA Piper, Baker McKenzie, Dentons, Norton Rose Fulbright and Squire Patton Boggs among others.

== See also ==
- List of largest law firms by profits per partner
- List of largest law firms by revenue
- List of largest United States-based law firms by profits per partner
- List of largest Canada-based law firms by revenue
- List of largest Europe-based law firms by revenue
- List of largest Japan-based law firms by head count
- List of largest China-based law firms by revenue
