= List of largest United States–based law firms =

This article lists the largest law firms in the United States.

== By head count ==
This section lists the largest law firms in the United States by total number of attorneys, as of 2022. The table is also sortable by total number of partners, associates, and total revenue.

Rank (2025)	Firm name	Largest U.S. Office	Total number of lawyers (2022)	Number of associates (2022)	Number of partners (2018)	Total revenue (millions, in 2018)	Notes
1	Dentons	New York City					
2	DLA Piper	New York City	4028	2492	1317	$2,634	
3	Baker McKenzie	Chicago	4795	2865	1518	$2,900	
4	Kirkland & Ellis	Chicago	3025	1772	1158	$3,165	
5	Latham & Watkins	New York City	3078	2004	821	$3,063	
6	Norton Rose Fulbright	New York City	3084	1928	1087	$1,958	
7	Hogan Lovells	Washington, D.C.	2532	1757	793	$2,036	
8	Greenberg Traurig	New York City	2209	841	1087	$1,477	
9	White & Case	New York City	2464	1589	587	$1,804	
10	Jones Day	Washington, D.C.	2406	1245	843	$1,959	
11	Sidley Austin	New York City	1893	1048	648	$2,036	
12	Morgan, Lewis & Bockius	Washington, D.C.	1992	1051	788	$2,001	
13	Gibson, Dunn & Crutcher	New York City	1538	990	412	$1,642	
14	Holland & Knight	Tampa	1393	505	640	$846	
15	Skadden Arps Slate Meagher & Flom	New York City	1644	1078	320	$2,582	
16	Mayer Brown	Chicago	1748	900	657	$1,313	
17	K&L Gates	Seattle	1698	855	757	$969	
18	Goodwin Procter	Boston	1315	737	417		
19	Lewis Brisbois Bisgaard & Smith	Los Angeles	1613	678	895	$470	
20	Reed Smith	New York City	1673	758	678	$1,119	
21	Simpson Thacher & Bartlett	New York City	1163	750	228		
22	Ropes & Gray	Boston	1372	986	265	$1,592	
23	Squire Patton Boggs	Washington, D.C.	1438	739	480	1,000	
24	McDermott Will & Schulte	Chicago	1177	459	607	$925	
25	Gordon Rees Scully Mansukhani	San Francisco					
26	King & Spalding	Atlanta	1261	565	488	$1,138	
27	Cooley LLP	Palo Alto	1267	808	328		
28	Covington & Burling	Washington, D.C.	1217	708	322	$945	
29	Littler Mendelson	Miami	986	360	472	$538	
30	Paul, Weiss, Rifkind, Wharton & Garrison	New York City	1008	686	168	$1,301	
31	Quinn Emanuel Urquhart & Sullivan	Los Angeles					
32	Weil, Gotshal & Manges	New York City	1180	749	263	$1,390	
33	Willkie Farr & Gallagher	New York City					
34	Paul Hastings	New York City					
35	Davis Polk & Wardwell	New York City	1025	735	161	$1,240	
36	Wilson Elser Moskowitz Edelman & Dicker	New York City					
37	Bryan Cave Leighton Paisner	St. Louis	1252	556	528	$592	
38	Troutman Pepper	Atlanta	1121	479	479		
39	Cleary Gottlieb Steen & Hamilton	New York City	1051	654	165	$1,214	
40	Foley & Lardner	Milwaukee	1021	434	468		
41	Perkins Coie	Seattle	1124	507	515		
42	Morgan & Morgan	Orlando	1062	867	195		
43	Wilson Sonsini Goodrich & Rosati	Palo Alto					
44	Polsinelli	Kansas City					
45	Jackson Lewis	Los Angeles					
46	Morrison & Foerster	San Francisco	996	550	298		
47	Faegre Drinker Biddle & Reath	Minneapolis	1093	392	552		
48	Ogletree, Deakins, Nash, Smoak & Stewart	Raleigh					
49	Orrick, Herrington & Sutcliffe	New York City					
50	Baker & Hostetler	New York City					

== By profits per partner ==
This is a list of American law firms by profits per equity partner (PPEP, sometimes reported as profits per partner or PPP). The list details the profit per equity partner figures of law firms by gross revenue; however, law firms with higher PPEP may not appear on this list if they were not included in the Global 100 by revenue.

Rank	Firm	Headquarters	2026 PPEP	Equity partners
1	Wachtell, Lipton, Rosen & Katz	New York City	$12,152,000	79
2	Kirkland & Ellis	Chicago	$11,121,000	595
3	Davis Polk & Wardwell	New York City	$9,800,000	189
4	Quinn Emanuel Urquhart & Sullivan	Los Angeles	$9,545,000	187
5	Gibson Dunn	Los Angeles	$8,890,000	272
6	Latham & Watkins	Los Angeles	$8,654,000	566
7	Paul, Weiss, Rifkind, Wharton & Garrison	New York City	$8,631,000	218
8	Simpson Thacher & Bartlett	New York City	$8,569,000	229
9	Paul Hastings	New York City	$8,330,000	164
10	Milbank	New York City	$7,620,000	172
11	Sullivan & Cromwell	New York City	$7,567,000	182
12	King & Spalding	Atlanta	$7,264,000	179
13	Cravath, Swaine & Moore	New York City	$7,200,000	88
14	Ropes & Gray	Boston	$7,047,000	222
15	Skadden, Arps, Slate, Meagher & Flom	New York City	$7,010,000	346
16	Dechert	Philadelphia	$6,198,000	134
17	Cleary Gottlieb Steen & Hamilton	New York City	$6,050,000	194
18	Debevoise & Plimpton	New York City	$6,001,000	151
19	Sidley Austin	Chicago	$5,967,000	255
20	Weil, Gotshal & Manges	New York City	$5,593,000	179

== See also ==
- List of largest law firms by revenue
- List of largest United Kingdom-based law firms by revenue
- List of largest Canada-based law firms by revenue
- List of largest Europe-based law firms by revenue
- List of largest Japan-based law firms by head count
- List of largest China-based law firms by revenue
