= List of law firms of Japan =

This is a list of the largest law firms in Japan focusing on corporate legal services by number of lawyers, as of June 2023.

| Rank | Firm | Head office | Lawyers |
|---|---|---|---|
| 1 | Nishimura & Asahi | Tokyo | 655 |
| 2 | Anderson Mōri & Tomotsune | Tokyo | 580 |
| 3 | Mori Hamada & Matsumoto | Tokyo | 567 |
| 4 | TMI Associates | Tokyo | 563 |
| 5 | Nagashima Ohno & Tsunematsu | Tokyo | 534 |
| 6 | Atsumi & Sakai | Tokyo | 195 |
| 7 | City-Yuwa Partners | Tokyo | 177 |
| 8 | Oh-Ebashi LPC & Partners | Osaka | 167 |
| 9 | Baker McKenzie | Tokyo | 144 |
| 10 | Kitahama Partners | Osaka | 99 |

== See also ==
- Attorneys in Japan
- List of largest law firms by revenue
- List of largest United States-based law firms by head count
- List of largest United States-based law firms by profits per partner
- List of largest United Kingdom-based law firms by revenue
- List of largest Canada-based law firms by revenue
- List of largest Europe-based law firms by revenue
- List of largest China-based law firms by revenue
