= 2000 Major League Baseball season =

2000 MLB season
- League: Major League Baseball
- Sport: Baseball
- Duration: March 29 – October 26, 2000
- Games: 162
- Teams: 30
- TV partner(s): Fox/FSN/FX; ESPN; NBC

Draft
- Top draft pick: Adrián González
- Picked by: Florida Marlins

Regular Season
- Season MVP: AL: Jason Giambi (OAK); NL: Jeff Kent (SF)

Postseason
- AL champions: New York Yankees
- AL runners-up: Seattle Mariners
- NL champions: New York Mets
- NL runners-up: St. Louis Cardinals

World Series
- Champions: New York Yankees
- Runners-up: New York Mets
- World Series MVP: Derek Jeter (NYY)

MLB seasons
- ← 1999 2001 →

Locations of AL teams for the 2000–2004 MLB seasons
West Central East
Locations of NL teams for the 2000 MLB seasons
West Central East

The 2000 Major League Baseball season ended with the New York Yankees defeating the New York Mets in five games, for their third consecutive World Series title.

A then-record 5,693 home runs were hit during the regular season in 2000 (the record was broken in 2017, when 6,105 home runs were hit). Ten teams hit at least 200 home runs each, while for the first time since 1989 and only the fifth since 1949 no pitcher pitched a no-hitter. (Note: Major League Baseball seasons since 1901 without a no-hitter pitched are 1909, 1913, 1921, 1927–1928, 1932–1933, 1936, 1939, 1942–1943, 1949, 1959, 1982, 1985, 1989, 2000, 2005, and 2025) Also, no team reached 100 in either the win or loss column.

The separate American and National League offices were dissolved; with this, Major League Baseball became a single unified organization. As a result, the separate umpiring crews for each league were also dissolved; all umpiring crews now worked throughout the league.

== Standings ==
=== American League ===
AL East
Team	W	L	Pct.	GB	Home	Road
^{(3)} New York Yankees	87	74	.540	—	44‍–‍36	43‍–‍38
Boston Red Sox	85	77	.525	2½	42‍–‍39	43‍–‍38
Toronto Blue Jays	83	79	.512	4½	45‍–‍36	38‍–‍43
Baltimore Orioles	74	88	.457	13½	44‍–‍37	30‍–‍51
Tampa Bay Devil Rays	69	92	.429	18	36‍–‍44	33‍–‍48

AL Central
Team	W	L	Pct.	GB	Home	Road
^{(1)} Chicago White Sox	95	67	.586	—	46‍–‍35	49‍–‍32
Cleveland Indians	90	72	.556	5	48‍–‍33	42‍–‍39
Detroit Tigers	79	83	.488	16	43‍–‍38	36‍–‍45
Kansas City Royals	77	85	.475	18	42‍–‍39	35‍–‍46
Minnesota Twins	69	93	.426	26	36‍–‍45	33‍–‍48

AL West
Team	W	L	Pct.	GB	Home	Road
^{(2)} Oakland Athletics	91	70	.565	—	47‍–‍34	44‍–‍36
^{(4)} Seattle Mariners	91	71	.562	½	47‍–‍34	44‍–‍37
Anaheim Angels	82	80	.506	9½	46‍–‍35	36‍–‍45
Texas Rangers	71	91	.438	20½	42‍–‍39	29‍–‍52

=== National League ===
NL East
Team	W	L	Pct.	GB	Home	Road
^{(3)} Atlanta Braves	95	67	.586	—	51‍–‍30	44‍–‍37
^{(4)} New York Mets	94	68	.580	1	55‍–‍26	39‍–‍42
Florida Marlins	79	82	.491	15½	43‍–‍38	36‍–‍44
Montreal Expos	67	95	.414	28	37‍–‍44	30‍–‍51
Philadelphia Phillies	65	97	.401	30	34‍–‍47	31‍–‍50

NL Central
Team	W	L	Pct.	GB	Home	Road
^{(2)} St. Louis Cardinals	95	67	.586	—	50‍–‍31	45‍–‍36
Cincinnati Reds	85	77	.525	10	43‍–‍38	42‍–‍39
Milwaukee Brewers	73	89	.451	22	42‍–‍39	31‍–‍50
Houston Astros	72	90	.444	23	39‍–‍42	33‍–‍48
Pittsburgh Pirates	69	93	.426	26	37‍–‍44	32‍–‍49
Chicago Cubs	65	97	.401	30	38‍–‍43	27‍–‍54

NL West
Team	W	L	Pct.	GB	Home	Road
^{(1)} San Francisco Giants	97	65	.599	—	55‍–‍26	42‍–‍39
Los Angeles Dodgers	86	76	.531	11	44‍–‍37	42‍–‍39
Arizona Diamondbacks	85	77	.525	12	47‍–‍34	38‍–‍43
Colorado Rockies	82	80	.506	15	48‍–‍33	34‍–‍47
San Diego Padres	76	86	.469	21	41‍–‍40	35‍–‍46

== Postseason ==
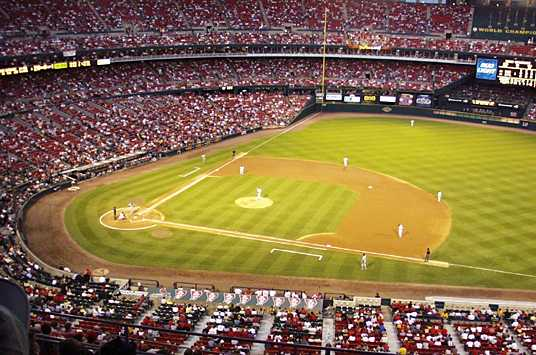
The season's eventual National League Central Division champions St. Louis Cardinals playing host to the Chicago Cubs during a September 2000 game at Busch Memorial Stadium.

=== Bracket ===
Division Series (ALDS, NLDS)
1	Chicago White Sox	0
4	Seattle	3
American League
2	Oakland	2
3	NY Yankees	3
1	San Francisco	1
4	NY Mets	3
National League
2	St. Louis	3
3	Atlanta	0

League Championship Series (NLCS, ALCS)
4	Seattle	2
3	NY Yankees	4
4	NY Mets	4
2	St. Louis	1

World Series
AL3	NY Yankees	4
NL4	NY Mets	1

== League leaders ==
=== American League ===
Batting leaders
Stat	Player	Total
AVG	Nomar Garciaparra (BOS)	.372
OPS	Manny Ramirez (CLE)	1.137
HR	Troy Glaus (ANA)	47
RBI	Edgar Martínez (SEA)	145
R	Johnny Damon (KC)	136
H	Darin Erstad (ANA)	240
SB	Johnny Damon (KC)	46

Pitching leaders
Stat	Player	Total
W	Tim Hudson (OAK); David Wells (TOR)	20
L	Brad Radke (MIN)	16
ERA	Pedro Martínez (BOS)	1.74
K	Pedro Martínez (BOS)	284
IP	Mike Mussina (BAL)	237.2
SV	Todd Jones (DET); Derek Lowe (BOS)	42
WHIP	Pedro Martínez (BOS)	0.737

=== National League ===
Batting leaders
Stat	Player	Total
AVG	Todd Helton (COL)	.372
OPS	Todd Helton (COL)	1.162
HR	Sammy Sosa (CHC)	50
RBI	Todd Helton (COL)	147
R	Jeff Bagwell (HOU)	152
H	Todd Helton (COL)	216
SB	Luis Castillo (FLA)	62

Pitching leaders
Stat	Player	Total
W	Tom Glavine (ATL)	21
L	Omar Daal (AZ/PHI)	19
ERA	Kevin Brown (LAD)	2.58
K	Randy Johnson (AZ)	347
IP	Jon Lieber (CHC)	251.0
SV	Antonio Alfonseca (FLA)	45
WHIP	Kevin Brown (LAD)	0.991

== Managers ==
=== American League ===
Team	Manager	Tenure
Anaheim Angels	Mike Scioscia	1st season
Baltimore Orioles	Mike Hargrove	1st season
Boston Red Sox	Jimy Williams	4th season
Chicago White Sox	Jerry Manuel	3rd season
Cleveland Indians	Charlie Manuel	1st season
Detroit Tigers	Phil Garner	1st season
Kansas City Royals	Tony Muser	4th season
Minnesota Twins	Tom Kelly	15th season
New York Yankees	Joe Torre	5th season
Oakland Athletics	Art Howe	5th season
Seattle Mariners	Lou Piniella	8th season
Tampa Bay Devil Rays	Larry Rothschild	3rd season
Texas Rangers	Johnny Oates	6th season
Toronto Blue Jays	Jim Fregosi	2nd season

=== National League ===
Team	Manager	Tenure
Arizona Diamondbacks	Buck Showalter	3rd season
Atlanta Braves	Bobby Cox	11th season
Chicago Cubs	Don Baylor	1st season
Cincinnati Reds	Jack McKeon	4th season
Colorado Rockies	Buddy Bell	1st season
Florida Marlins	John Boles Jr.	2nd season
Houston Astros	Larry Dierker	4th season
Los Angeles Dodgers	Davey Johnson	2nd season
Milwaukee Brewers	Davey Lopes	1st season
Montreal Expos	Felipe Alou	9th season
New York Mets	Bobby Valentine	5th season
Philadelphia Phillies	Terry Francona	4th season
Pittsburgh Pirates	Gene Lamont	4th season
St. Louis Cardinals	Tony La Russa	5th season
San Diego Padres	Bruce Bochy	6th season
San Francisco Giants	Dusty Baker	8th season

== Awards and honors ==
- Baseball Hall of Fame
  - Sparky Anderson
  - Carlton Fisk
  - Bid McPhee
  - Tony Pérez
  - Turkey Stearnes

Baseball Writers' Association of America Awards
BBWAA Award	National League	American League
Rookie of the Year	Rafael Furcal (ATL)	Kazuhiro Sasaki (SEA)
Cy Young Award	Randy Johnson (AZ)	Pedro Martínez (BOS)
Manager of the Year	Dusty Baker (SF)	Jerry Manuel (CWS)
Most Valuable Player	Jeff Kent (SF)	Jason Giambi (OAK)
Gold Glove Awards
Position	National League	American League
Pitcher	Greg Maddux (ATL)	Kenny Rogers (TEX)
Catcher	Mike Matheny (STL)	Iván Rodríguez (TEX)
First Baseman	J. T. Snow (SF)	John Olerud (SEA)
Second Baseman	Pokey Reese (CIN)	Roberto Alomar (CLE)
Third Baseman	Scott Rolen (PHI)	Travis Fryman (CLE)
Shortstop	Neifi Pérez (COL)	Omar Vizquel (CLE)
Outfielders	Steve Finley (AZ)	Bernie Williams (NYY)
Outfielders	Jim Edmonds (STL)	Jermaine Dye (KC)
Outfielders	Andruw Jones (ATL)	Darin Erstad (ANA)
Silver Slugger Awards
Pitcher/Designated Hitter	Mike Hampton (NYM)	Frank Thomas (CWS)
Catcher	Mike Piazza (NYM)	Jorge Posada (NYY)
First Baseman	Todd Helton (COL)	Carlos Delgado (TOR)
Second Baseman	Jeff Kent (SF)	Roberto Alomar (CLE)
Third Baseman	Chipper Jones (ATL)	Troy Glaus (ANA)
Shortstop	Édgar Renteria (STL)	Alex Rodriguez (SEA)
Outfielders	Barry Bonds (SF)	Darin Erstad (ANA)
Outfielders	Vladimir Guerrero (MON)	Magglio Ordonez (CWS)
Outfielders	Sammy Sosa (CHC)	Manny Ramirez (CLE)

=== Other awards ===
- Outstanding Designated Hitter Award: Edgar Martínez (SEA)
- Hank Aaron Award: Carlos Delgado (TOR, American); Todd Helton (COL, National).
- Roberto Clemente Award (Humanitarian): Al Leiter (NYM).
- Rolaids Relief Man Award: Todd Jones (DET, American); Antonio Alfonseca (FLA, National).
- Warren Spahn Award (Best left-handed pitcher): Randy Johnson (AZ)

=== Player of the Month ===
Month	American League	National League
April	Jermaine Dye	Vladimir Guerrero
May	Edgar Martínez	Todd Helton
June	Albert Belle	Jeff Kent
July	Johnny Damon	Sammy Sosa
August	Glenallen Hill	Todd Helton
September	Jason Giambi	Richard Hidalgo

=== Pitcher of the Month ===
Month	American League	National League
April	Pedro Martínez	Randy Johnson
May	James Baldwin	Garrett Stephenson
June	Cal Eldred	Al Leiter
July	Roger Clemens	Jeff D'Amico
August	Steve Sparks	Russ Ortiz
September	Tim Hudson	Greg Maddux

== Home field attendance and payroll ==
Team name	Wins	%±	Home attendance	%±	Per game	Est. payroll	%±
Cleveland Indians	90	−7.2%	3,456,278	−0.4%	42,670	$76,972,271	4.5%
St. Louis Cardinals	95	26.7%	3,336,493	3.4%	41,191	$61,653,863	23.3%
San Francisco Giants	97	12.8%	3,318,800	59.7%	40,973	$53,737,826	14.8%
Baltimore Orioles	74	−5.1%	3,297,031	−4.0%	40,704	$82,347,435	1.9%
Colorado Rockies	82	13.9%	3,295,129	−5.3%	40,681	$61,111,190	−1.3%
Atlanta Braves	95	−7.8%	3,234,304	−1.5%	39,930	$84,737,836	15.5%
Houston Astros	72	−25.8%	3,056,139	12.9%	37,730	$51,289,111	−6.9%
New York Yankees	87	−11.2%	3,055,435	−7.2%	38,193	$93,113,260	7.1%
Arizona Diamondbacks	85	−15.0%	2,942,251	−2.6%	36,324	$81,027,833	17.9%
Seattle Mariners	91	15.2%	2,914,624	−0.1%	35,983	$60,495,000	11.8%
Los Angeles Dodgers	86	11.7%	2,880,242	−6.9%	35,559	$88,124,286	8.7%
New York Mets	94	−3.1%	2,820,530	3.5%	34,821	$79,509,776	15.5%
Chicago Cubs	65	−3.0%	2,789,511	−0.9%	34,438	$60,539,333	−2.9%
Texas Rangers	71	−25.3%	2,588,401	−6.6%	31,956	$70,795,921	−7.7%
Boston Red Sox	85	−9.6%	2,585,895	5.7%	31,925	$79,975,333	24.8%
Cincinnati Reds	85	−11.5%	2,577,371	25.0%	31,431	$46,867,200	38.0%
Detroit Tigers	79	14.5%	2,438,617	20.3%	30,106	$59,645,167	62.6%
San Diego Padres	76	2.7%	2,352,443	−6.8%	29,043	$55,021,000	10.6%
Anaheim Angels	82	17.1%	2,066,982	−8.3%	25,518	$52,664,167	−5.3%
Chicago White Sox	95	26.7%	1,947,799	45.5%	24,047	$31,743,500	22.9%
Pittsburgh Pirates	69	−11.5%	1,748,908	6.8%	21,591	$31,328,334	25.1%
Toronto Blue Jays	83	−1.2%	1,705,712	−21.2%	21,058	$46,038,332	1.3%
Philadelphia Phillies	65	−15.6%	1,612,769	−11.6%	19,911	$47,513,000	49.0%
Oakland Athletics	91	4.6%	1,603,744	11.8%	19,799	$33,172,333	33.6%
Milwaukee Brewers	73	−1.4%	1,573,621	−7.5%	19,427	$37,305,333	−14.0%
Kansas City Royals	77	20.3%	1,564,847	3.9%	19,319	$24,903,000	−6.6%
Tampa Bay Devil Rays	69	0.0%	1,449,673	−7.2%	18,121	$63,265,129	62.8%
Florida Marlins	79	23.4%	1,218,326	−11.0%	15,041	$20,347,000	−3.5%
Minnesota Twins	69	9.5%	1,000,760	−16.8%	12,355	$17,529,500	−20.7%
Montreal Expos	67	−1.5%	926,272	19.8%	11,435	$32,994,333	84.3%

== Television coverage ==
This was the fifth and final season of the rights agreements with ESPN, Fox and NBC. ESPN continued to air Sunday Night Baseball and Wednesday Night Baseball. Fox's coverage included Fox Saturday Baseball broadcasts, Thursday night games on Fox Sports Net and Saturday primetime games on FX. NBC aired the All-Star Game. During the postseason, ESPN, Fox and NBC split the four Division Series. NBC then televised the American League Championship Series while Fox aired both the National League Championship Series and the World Series.

ESPN and Fox then signed new five-year and six-year deals, respectively, while NBC declined to renew in a cost-cutting move.

== Events ==
=== January–March ===
- January 6 – Major league officials order Atlanta Braves reliever John Rocker is to undergo psychological testing following derogatory remarks he made in an interview with Sports Illustrated magazine. Commissioner Bud Selig says he will listen to what the doctors say before deciding what punishment—if any—will be handed down to the pitcher.
- January 11 – The baseball writers elect catcher Carlton Fisk and first baseman Tony Pérez to the Hall of Fame. Fisk is chosen in his 2nd year on the ballot, while Pérez is picked on his 9th try.
- January 31 – Braves reliever John Rocker is suspended from baseball until May 1 by Commissioner Bud Selig for his racial and ethnic remarks in an article published in Sports Illustrated the previous month. He was also fined $20,000 and ordered to undergo sensitivity training.
- February 10 – The Seattle Mariners accommodate center fielder Ken Griffey Jr., trading him to his hometown Cincinnati Reds in exchange for four players. Cincinnati resisted giving up infielder Pokey Reese.
- February 29 – Manager Sparky Anderson, 19th-century star Bid McPhee, and Negro leagues player Norman "Turkey" Stearnes are elected to the Hall of Fame by the Veterans Committee.
- March 1 – Independent arbitrator Shyam Das cuts Braves pitcher John Rocker's suspension from 28 days to 14 days. Rocker, who is allowed to report to spring training with the team, also has his fine cut.
- March 29 – The Chicago Cubs open the major league season in the Tokyo Dome in Tokyo, Japan, by defeating the New York Mets 5–3, in the first big league game ever played outside of North America. Jon Lieber gets the victory and Mike Hampton takes the loss. Shane Andrews hits the first home run of the season. Mark Grace and Mike Piazza also homer.
- March 30 – Rickey Henderson of the New York Mets tied a record (with Ted Williams) when he became the second player in major league history with a stolen base in four consecutive decades (1970s–2000s) when he steals a base against the Chicago Cubs. It was his 1,335th career stolen base.

=== April–May ===
- April 3 – Andrés Galarraga hits a home run in his first game back after missing the entire 1999 season following cancer surgery. Atlanta defeat the Colorado Rockies 2–0.
- April 3 – The Los Angeles Dodgers defeat the Montreal Expos 10–4, behind Eric Karros' grand slam. Right fielder Vladimir Guerrero hits a pair of home runs for Montreal as a new major league record for Opening Day is set with five players having multiple home run games.
- April 4 – Expos closer Ugueth Urbina strikes out the Dodgers in the top of the ninth inning on nine pitches, tying a major league record.
- April 7 – A total of 57 home runs are hit in the 15 games played, for a new major league record. The previous mark of 55 was set in 17 games on August 13, 1999. There were 36 homers hit in the AL, eclipsing the previous mark for a single league.
- April 7 – The Tampa Bay Devil Rays open their home schedule playing home games at Tropicana Field on the new FieldTurf artificial surface, the first professional baseball venue to use that material. They lose to the Cleveland Indians, 14–5.
- April 9 – The Minnesota Twins defeat the Kansas City Royals 13–7. In the process, they become the first teams in major league history to each hit back-to-back-to-back home runs in the same game. Ron Coomer, Jacque Jones, and Matt LeCroy hit consecutive homers for Minnesota in the 6th inning, followed by three in a row by Carlos Beltrán, Jermaine Dye, and Mike Sweeney of Kansas City an inning later.
- April 10 – Colorado beats Cincinnati 7–5, despite Ken Griffey Jr.'s 400th career home run. Aged 30, Griffey is the youngest player in major league history to reach that milestone.
- April 11 – The Los Angeles Dodgers edge the San Francisco Giants 6–5 in the first game played at Pacific Bell Park in San Francisco. Shortstop Kevin Elster leads the Dodger attack with three home runs.
- April 11 – The Detroit Tigers sink the Seattle Mariners 5–2 in the first game played at Comerica Park in Detroit.
- April 15 – The Baltimore Orioles defeat the Twins 6–4, as Cal Ripken Jr. gets the 3,000th hit of his career. Ripken goes 3-for-5 in becoming the 24th player to reach the milestone, and the 7th to get 3,000 hits and 400 home runs.
- April 16 – Cleveland Indians starter Chuck Finley, who was already the only pitcher to strike out four batters in one inning twice, does it for the third time, striking out Tom Evans, Royce Clayton, Chad Curtis (who takes first on a passed ball) and Rafael Palmeiro in the third inning. Finley beats the Texas Rangers 2–1 with the help of back-to-back ninth-inning home runs from Manny Ramírez and Jim Thome.
- April 21 – The Anaheim Angels down the Tampa Bay Devil Rays 9–6. Mo Vaughn and Tim Salmon hit back-to-back home runs for Anaheim in the fourth inning, then do so again in the ninth. Troy Glaus also homers in both the fourth and the ninth. This the first time in major league history that three players homer in the same inning on two occasions in the same game. The Angels' three players with two home runs each in one game ties a major league record.
- April 23 – In the New York Yankees' 10–7 victory over the Toronto Blue Jays, Yankees Bernie Williams and Jorge Posada each hit home runs from both sides of the plate, marking the first time in major league history that a pair of teammates accomplish the feat in the same game.
- April 29 – The San Francisco Giants defeat the Montreal Expos 2–1 for their first victory at Pacific Bell Park. They are the first team to lose six straight games to begin play in a newly constructed home venue.
- April 30 – The St. Louis Cardinals defeat the Philadelphia Phillies 4–3, as Mark McGwire and Jim Edmonds hit home runs. St. Louis finishes the month with 55 homers, a new record for April. It also ties the National League mark for homers in any month. Major league batters also set a record for most home runs in a month by hitting 931 in April; the total is 140 more than the number hit in 1999.
- May 10 – Rickey Henderson becomes the 21st major league player to amass 10,000 career at-bats. Henderson finishes the night with 10,002 at-bats and trails only Cal Ripken Jr. among active players.
- May 11 – At Wrigley Field, the Milwaukee Brewers defeat the Chicago Cubs 14–8 in the longest 9-inning game in National League history–4 hours and 22 minutes. For the Brewers, Mark Loretta goes 5-for-5 to offset Glenallen Hill's second-inning home run, which lands on the roof of a building on Waveland Avenue, beyond the left field seats.
- May 18 – Mark McGwire hits three home runs and has seven RBI in a 7–2 victory for the St. Louis Cardinals over the Philadelphia Phillies. With the home runs, McGwire moves past former New York Yankee Mickey Mantle into 8th all-time on the career home run list with 539.
- May 19 – The Pittsburgh Pirates defeat the Cardinals 13–1, as catcher Jason Kendall hits for the cycle, becoming the first Pirate ever to do so at Three Rivers Stadium.
- May 23 – The Baltimore Orioles defeat the Seattle Mariners 4–2. Rickey Henderson of the Mariners draws his 2,000th career walk in the 9th inning of the game, becoming the third player to achieve that mark, along with Babe Ruth and Ted Williams.
- May 29 – Second baseman Randy Velarde of the Oakland Athletics turns an unassisted triple play, just the 11th in major league history, on a line drive by the New York Yankees' Shane Spencer. With runners on first and second running with the pitch, Velarde catches Spencer's line drive, tags Jorge Posada as he nears second base, then tags Tino Martinez out before he can return to second base. In 1995, while with the Yankees, Velarde turned an unassisted triple play against the Los Angeles Dodgers in spring training following the strike.

=== June–July ===
- June 1 – Japanese right-hander Tomokazu Ohka, a pitcher with the Pawtucket Red Sox, becomes the first pitcher in nearly 50 years to throw a nine-inning perfect game in the International League. Ohka retired all 27 batters he faced in a 2–0 triumph over the Charlotte Knights. The 24-year-old Ohka needs just 76 pitches to toss the first nine-inning perfect game in the IL since Dick Marlowe did it for Buffalo in 1952.
- June 2 – With the Detroit Tigers visiting Wrigley Field for the first time since the 1945 World Series, Chicago Cubs reliever Rick Aguilera pitches a perfect ninth inning for his 300th save in a 2–0 Chicago victory.
- June 2 – Tampa Bay Devil Rays first baseman Fred McGriff becomes the 31st player to hit 400 career home runs when he hits a two-run home run against Glendon Rusch in a 5–3 loss to the New York Mets at Shea Stadium.
- June 2 – The Montreal Expos announce they will wear Maurice Richard's uniform number 9 on their jerseys for the rest of the season to honor the Montreal Canadiens great who died the previous week. It is believed to be the first time a major league team has honored an athlete from another sport in this way.
- June 16 – Yankees second baseman Chuck Knoblauch voluntarily leaves the field after six innings of the Yankees' 12–3 loss to the Chicago White Sox, after making three throwing errors. He leaves Yankee Stadium in his street clothes while the game is still in progress.
- June 18 - In a game against the Arizona Diamondbacks, Colorado Rockies second baseman Mike Lansing hit for the cycle faster than any player in MLB history, completing it by the fourth inning in a 19–2 win.
- June 21 – Oakland defeats the Orioles 10–3, as Eric Chavez becomes the first Athletics player to hit for the cycle at home since the team moved to Oakland in 1968.
- June 26 – The Diamondbacks defeat the Astros 6–1. Arizona rookie first baseman Alex Cabrera hits a two-run pinch-hit home run in his first major league at bat.
- June 30 – Trailing 8–1 to the Atlanta Braves, the New York Mets score 10 runs in the bottom of the 8th inning, capped off by Mike Piazza's 3-run home run off reliever Terry Mulholland. There had been 4 walks in the inning, and 9 of the 10 runs scored were with 2 outs in the inning.
- July 1 – On Canada's 133rd birthday, the Florida Marlins' Ryan Dempster and the Montreal Expos' Mike Johnson face each other in a rare matchup of Canadian starters. Dempster's Marlins win the game 6–5. Johnson is from Edmonton, Alberta, while Dempster hails from Sechelt, British Columbia. It is the first matchup of Canadian-born starters since September 1999, when Dempster took on Éric Gagné of the Dodgers.
- July 5 – Arizona outfielder Luis Gonzalez becomes the first Arizona Diamondback to hit for the cycle, helping his team to defeat the Astros 12–9. It is the first time the feat is accomplished in new Enron Field, and Gonzalez is just the 9th player in baseball history to both hit for the cycle and have a 30+ game hitting streak in a career.
- July 6 – St. Louis rookie catcher Keith McDonald hits a home run in his second at bat, becoming only the second player in major league history to hit home runs in each of his first two big league at bats. Bob Nieman, in 1951, is the other.
- July 6 – Dodgers pitcher Orel Hershiser announces his retirement.
- July 6 – The American Sportscasters Association names Dodgers legend Vin Scully as the No. 1 sportscaster of the 20th century. Howard Cosell finishes second, followed by Mel Allen and Red Barber.
- July 8 – In a New York matchup, the Yankees defeat the Mets by identical 4–2 scores in both ends of an unusual day-night doubleheader. With the first game played at Shea Stadium and the nightcap at Yankee Stadium, it is the first time since 1903 that two teams played two games in different stadiums on the same day. Dwight Gooden wins the first game with a six inning effort in his first start since returning to the Yankees. Roger Clemens wins the nightcap. During the second game, Clemens hit Mike Piazza in the helmet with an inside fastball, causing Piazza to suffer a concussion.
- July 11 – The American League wins its fourth consecutive All-Star Game, beating the National League 6–3. Derek Jeter of the Yankees and Chipper Jones of the Braves each go 3-for-3 in the contest. Jeter takes MVP honors, while James Baldwin of the White Sox is the winning pitcher.
- July 15 – A 1909 Honus Wagner baseball card is auctioned for a record $1.1 million on eBay. Other high-priced items in the auction include a baseball autographed by the entire 1919 "Chicago Black Sox" team, including Shoeless Joe Jackson, which sold for $93,666. Also, a baseball autographed by the 1919 Cincinnati Reds sells for $11,208, and a Babe Ruth signed baseball is auctioned for $76,020. A contract from Shoeless Joe Jackson's sale of his Chicago pool hall to teammate Lefty Williams sells for $36,098. The contract, dated October 6, 1921, is for just $1.
- July 20 – In Houston's 6–2 win over Cincinnati, Reds pinch-hitter Mike Bell strikes out in his major league debut, making history by becoming part of the first third-generation family to play for the same major league team. His grandfather Gus Bell and father Buddy Bell also played for the Reds.

=== August ===
- August 4 – The Blue Jays obtain outfielder Dave Martinez from the Rangers. Martinez becomes the 9th major leaguer to play for four teams in a season. He began the year with Tampa Bay and also played with the Cubs, in addition to Texas and Toronto. The last to do so was Dave Kingman (1977). Before him, according to historian Scott Flatow, the four-in-one players were Frank Huelsman (1904), Willis Hudlin (1940), Paul Lehner (1951), Ted Gray (1955), Wes Covington (1961) and Mike Kilkenny (1972).
- August 8 – Trailing 3–2 entering the bottom of the ninth, the Yankees hit back-to-back home runs on back-to-back pitches from Oakland closer Jason Isringhausen. Bernie Williams jumped on the first pitch and sent it over the right field fence to tie the game, then David Justice sent the very next offering from Isringhausen over the center field wall to give the Yankees the win.
- August 19 – The Yankees beat the Angels 9–1, hitting a major league record-tying three sacrifice flies in the 3rd inning.
- August 19 – In the Houston Astros' 10–8 victory over the Milwaukee Brewers, Jeff Bagwell has two home runs and five RBI. Bagwell becomes the first Houston player to reach 300 homers in his career.
- August 21 – Potomac's Esix Snead breaks Lenny Dykstra's Carolina League record of 105 stolen bases by swiping his 106th. Snead has a batting average of .242 and a .338 on-base percentage. It's the 10th time in the last 20 years that a minor-leaguer has stolen 100 or more bases in a season. According to Howe Sports data, the eight players who stole 100 or more bases in the minors were:
  - Vince Coleman (Macon, South Atlantic, 1983–145)
  - Donell Nixon (Bakersfield, California, 1983–144)
  - Jeff Stone (Spartanburg, South Atlantic, 1983–123)
  - Alan Wiggins (Lodi, California, 1980–120)
  - Marcus Lawton (Columbia, South Atlantic, 1985–111)
  - Esix Snead (Potomac, Carolina, 2000–106)
  - Lenny Dykstra (Lynchburg, Carolina, 1983–105)
  - Donell Nixon (Chattanooga, Southern, 1984–102)
  - Vince Coleman (Louisville, American Association, 1983— 101)
  - Albert Hall (Durham, Carolina, 1980–100)
- August 22 – The Dodgers defeat the Expos 14–6, as Eric Karros becomes the first Dodger player to hit two home runs in a single inning (6th).
- August 27 – The Anaheim Angels edge the Cleveland Indians 10–9, as outfielder Tim Salmon hits his 30th home run of the year in the 5th inning. Anaheim become the first team in AL history to have four players (Troy Glaus, Mo Vaughn, Garret Anderson, Salmon) reach the 30-homer mark in a single season. The Toronto Blue Jays are close with two hitters over 30 and two at 28. It's been done seven times in the NL.

=== September ===
- September 1 – For the second time in the season, pitcher Ryan Rupe of the Tampa Bay Devil Rays gives up a grand slam to Kansas City Royals outfielder Jermaine Dye. The other slam was on April 26.
- September 3 – Kenny Lofton of the Cleveland Indians ties a major league record by scoring in his 18th straight game in the first inning of the Cleveland Indians' 12–11, 13-inning victory over the Baltimore Orioles. Red Rolfe set the record in 1939 for the New York Yankees.
- September 4 – At Fenway Park, Carl Everett of the Boston Red Sox becomes only the sixth major-league switch-hitter to drive in 100 runs in both leagues when he knocks in his 100th RBI of the year. Boston wins over the Seattle Mariners, 5–1. Everett drove in 108 runs for the Houston Astros in 1999. The other five 100–100 switch-hitters were Ted Simmons, Ken Singleton, Eddie Murray, Bobby Bonilla and J. T. Snow. Before the game, the Red Sox honor Hall of Fame catcher Carlton Fisk. Fisk, who played his first nine seasons with Boston, joins Bobby Doerr (1), Joe Cronin (4), Carl Yastrzemski (8) and Ted Williams (9) in having his number (27) be retired at Fenway.
- September 6 – Scott Sheldon of the Texas Rangers becomes just the third player in major league history to play all nine positions in one game when he does it in a 13–1 loss to the Chicago White Sox. Sheldon joins Bert Campaneris (September 8, 1965) and César Tovar (September 22, 1968) as true utility players.
- September 6 – After reaching an agreement with Morgan, Lewis and Bockis LLP, Major League Baseball can now use the URL https://www.mlb.com. The law firm registered the domain name in 1994 and refused to release it, making it necessary for the league to use http://www.majorleaguebaseball.com.
- September 10 – Randy Johnson of the Arizona Diamondbacks becomes the 12th pitcher to reach the 3,000-strikeout plateau, fanning a season-high 14 in seven innings as the Diamondbacks lose to the Florida Marlins 4–3 in 12 innings. Johnson's 3,000 strikeout victim is Mike Lowell, who fans to end the 4th inning. In the first inning, Johnson also records his 300th strikeout for the third consecutive season and the fourth time overall. Nolan Ryan is the only other pitcher to accomplish the feat, and is the only pitcher who has reached 300 strikeouts more times with six (1972–74, 1976–77 and 1989).
- September 12 – The Diamondbacks edge the Dodgers 5–4, despite Dave Hansen's major league record-breaking seventh pinch-hit home run of the season. Hansen's blast, off Curt Schilling, breaks the mark set in 1932 by Brooklyn's Johnny Frederick.
- September 15 – Rickey Henderson scores his first two at bats to pace the Seattle Mariners to a 10–2 win over the Baltimore Orioles. Henderson moves into second place on the all-time list of runs (2,175), one ahead of Babe Ruth and Hank Aaron.
- September 16 – The St. Louis Cardinals defeat the Chicago Cubs 7–6, despite Sammy Sosa's 50th home run of the season. Sosa becomes the second player to hit 50 or more in three consecutive years, joining Mark McGwire.
- September 22 – José Lima of the Houston Astros sets an NL single-season record by allowing his 47th home run in the Astros' 12–5 loss to the Cincinnati Reds. The major league record for home runs allowed in a season is 50, set by the Minnesota Twins' Bert Blyleven in 1986.
- September 26 – Longtime broadcast partner NBC declines to renew its rights. NBC had televised baseball since 1947, with the exception of 1990–93, and had been the exclusive home of the World Series for 26 years.
- September 27 – In an Oakland 9–7 victory over the Angels, Anaheim's Darin Erstad hits a home run in the 2nd inning for his 99th RBI of the year from the leadoff spot to set a new record. Nomar Garciaparra drove home 98 in 1997 for the previous mark.

SEASON NOTE – This was the first time in MLB history in 100 years that no team finished with a winning percentage either below .400 or above .600. It is also the first time, in a full 162-game season, that no team achieved 100 wins or 99 losses.

=== October–December ===
- October 8 – Bobby Jones of the New York Mets one-hits the San Francisco Giants in Game Four of the NLDS to advance the Mets to the NLCS.
- October 26 – The New York Yankees defeat the New York Mets 4–2, to win their 26th World Series, 4-games to 1. Luis Sojo hits a single in the top of the 9th inning and drives home the winning run for his team. Bernie Williams and Derek Jeter homer for the Yankees, and Jeter is named the Series MVP.
- November 18 – The Mariners sign Japanese star outfielder Ichiro Suzuki to a three-year contract.
- December 11 – The Rangers sign free agent shortstop Alex Rodriguez to a record $252 million, 10-year contract. It is the richest contract in the history of professional sports.

== Deaths ==
- January 4 – John Milner, 50, first baseman and left fielder for the Mets and Pirates who hit 20 home runs twice, had 10 career grand slams
- January 11 – Bob Lemon, 79, Hall of Fame pitcher who won 207 games including a no-hitter for the Cleveland Indians, posting seven 20-win seasons; won final game of 1948 World Series, and managed Yankees to 1978 championship
- January 16 – By Saam, 85, broadcaster for the Philadelphia Athletics and Phillies from 1938 to 1975
- March 7 – Jack Sanford, 70, All-Star pitcher who was the 1957 NL Rookie of the Year; was 24–7 for 1962 Giants
- June 2 – Ellis Clary, 83, infielder for the Senators and Browns; later a scout for 32 years
- June 5 – Don Liddle, 75, pitcher for the New York Giants during Game 1 of the 1954 World Series when teammate Willie Mays made his famous over-the-shoulder catch
- June 21 – Bud Stewart, 84, outfielder who was the AL runner-up in triples with the 1948 Senators
- June 23 – Bob Tillman, 63, catcher for the Red Sox and Braves who caught two no-hitters and had three home runs in a 1969 game
- September 3 – Clyde Sukeforth, 98, catcher for the Reds and Dodgers who later scouted Jackie Robinson, and also signed Don Newcombe and Roberto Clemente; served as acting manager for Robinson's Dodgers debut April 15, 1947, which broke MLB's color barrier
- September 17 – Chico Salmon, 59, infielder for the Indians and Orioles who had a crucial pinch hit in the 1970 World Series
- September 23 – Aurelio Rodríguez, 52, third baseman, primarily for the Tigers, who won a Gold Glove and retired with the sixth most games at his position
- October 22 – Hank Wyse. 82, All-Star pitcher who helped the Cubs to clinch the 1945 National League title after going 22–10 with a 2.68 ERA and the last Cubs pitcher to appear in a Series game
- October 28 – Andújar Cedeño, 31, shortstop for the Astros and Padres who hit for the cycle in a 1992 game
- November 25 – Hugh Alexander, 83, outfielder who played seven games for 1937 Indians; became a scout for 61 years after losing his left hand in an accident
- December 10 – Willard Nixon, 72, pitcher who won 69 games for the Red Sox
- December 19 – Lou Polli, 99, Italian relief pitcher for the 1932 Browns and 1944 Giants

== See also ==
- 2000 Nippon Professional Baseball season
