= Olswang =

Law firm

Olswang LLP
- Headquarters: Cannon Street; London, EC4; United Kingdom
- No. of offices: 7
- No. of lawyers: 500+
- Major practice areas: General practice
- Key people: Paul Stevens (CEO); Mark Devereux (Senior Partner); Dirk Van Liedekerke (Chairman)
- Date founded: 1981 (London)
- Company type: LLP
- Dissolved: 1 May 2017 (merged)
- Website: olswang.com

Olswang was an international law firm headquartered in London, United Kingdom and with additional offices in Reading, Brussels, Madrid, Paris, Singapore and, since 2011, Munich. It worked closely with a network of firms across eighty countries. The Lawyer ranked the firm 22nd largest in the UK by worldwide turnover in 2010. That year, the firm had over 600 staff, including 97 partners. David Stewart was the firm's chief executive. On 1 May 2017, Olswang merged with CMS Cameron McKenna and Nabarro to form CMS Nabarro Olswang LLP.

The firm's main practice areas included media, technology, telecommunications, real estate, corporate, intellectual property, commercial litigation and arbitration, finance, leisure, tax, EU and competition, and employment.

== History ==
Olswang was founded in 1981 by Simon Olswang as a breakaway from property law firm Brecher & Co. Its early reputation was primarily based on film and media work. The firm grew rapidly through the 1990s, developing more of a focus on technology as well as media. In common with other professional service firms, Olswang converted to a limited liability partnership status under English law with effect from 1 May 2009.

Olswang brought libel actions against Bill Browder on behalf of Pavel Karpov of the Russian interior ministry, over the Magnitsky story.

== Merger ==
Olswang merged with CMS Cameron McKenna LLP and Nabarro LLP on 1 May 2017 with the name CMS Cameron McKenna Nabarro Olswang LLP.

== Main areas of practice ==
- Commercial litigation & arbitration
- Corporate
- Employment
- EU & competition
- Finance
- Intellectual property (IP)
- Leisure
- Life sciences
- Media
- Real estate
- Tax
- Technology
- Telecommunications
