= WFW =

WFW or WfW may refer to:

- Watford West railway station, a disused railway station in Watford, Hertfordshire (National Rail station code)
- Watson, Farley & Williams, a law firm based in London, UK
- Windows for Workgroups, an operating system developed by Microsoft
- Microsoft Word for Windows, a popular word-processing software
- The World of Fine Wine, a wine magazine
