= McGrigors =

McGrigors LLP
- Company type: law firm
- Industry: Law
- Founded: Scotland (1769)
- Fate: Merged into Pinsent Masons in May 2012
- Products: Legal advice
- Number of employees: 700+

McGrigors LLP was a UK Top 50 law firm with offices in six British cities as well as Qatar and the Falkland Islands. The firm merged with international law firm Pinsent Masons in 2012.

== History ==
- 1769 – John Maxwell (of Dargavel), known as John Maxwell Jnr to distinguish him from fellow lawyer and relative John Maxwell (of Fingalton), commences practice in Glasgow.
- 1782 – William Lindsay (of Oatlands) commences practice.
- 1792 – Alexander B McGrigor commences practice.
- 1801 – John Maxwell (of Dargavel, and son of John below), suffering from a paralysis, hands over his law practice to Colin D Donald (1777–1859, a cousin). CDD was trained by James Dundas CS. James was the father of John Dundas, who with Charles Wilson founded Dundas & Wilson.
- 1821 – Robert Moncrieff and James Finlayson commence practice as Moncrieff & Finlayson.
- 1824 – William Lindsay (of Oatlands) assumes Hugh Moncrieff as a partner, but dies within a year.
- 1826 – Hugh & Robert Moncrieff merge their existing practices.
- 1871 – Glasgow law firms of McGrigor, Stevenson & Fleming and C D Donald & Sons merge to create McGrigor Donald & Co.
- 1978 – McGrigor Donald & Co opened Edinburgh office.
- February 1985 – McGrigor Donald & Co merges with Moncrieff Warren Paterson & Co to commence business in new offices in Pacific House as McGrigor Donald & Moncrieff.
- December 1987 – name change to McGrigor Donald.
- 1988 – McGrigor Donald opened a London office. An English practice associated with the firm is started – Stephen Kingsley & Associates.
- 1999 – KLegal was founded as the UK law firm associated with KPMG.
- 2000 – Belfast office opened, and McGrigor Donald Belfast partnership formed.
- March 2002 – the McGrigor Donald London partnership merged with, and became known as, KLegal.
- February 2004 – the firm became known as McGrigors – prior to this, it had been known as McGrigor Donald in Scotland (Glasgow & Edinburgh) and Belfast and KLegal in London.
- April 2006 – 12 partners and 42 staff join McGrigors and McGrigors Aberdeen office opened.
- October 2006 – the firm becomes a multi national legal practice (MNP) recognised by the Law Societies of England & Wales and Scotland, and converts to a limited liability partnership. McGrigors and McGrigors London cease.
- October 2007 – McGrigors Belfast converts to an LLP, although not the first practice to be recognised as an incorporated practice by the Law Society of Northern Ireland, it is the first LLP.
- January 2008 – In response to Client demand McGrigors opens an office in Manchester.
- August 2008 – 4 Partners and 13 staff join the London office from Reid Minty LLP, a boutique London litigation practice.
- October 2009 – 10 Partners and 75 staff join the Belfast office from L'Estrange & Brett, one of the oldest and largest firms in Northern Ireland, specialising in commercial property, corporate work and litigation. The merged firm will be Northern Ireland's first major law firm to offer national reach.
- September 2010 – 3 partners and 7 staff join McGrigors in Manchester, bringing the total number of people in the office to around 35.
- March 2011: McGrigors announces the opening of a new branch office in the Qatar Financial Centre, Doha, Qatar
- February 2012: McGrigors announces merger with Pinsent Masons.
- 1 May 2012: McGrigors merges with Pinsent Masons.
