= Atsumi & Sakai =

Atsumi & Sakai 渥美坂井法律事務所
- Headquarters: Tokyo, Japan
- No. of offices: 1
- No. of lawyers: 88, including 8 registered foreign lawyers (Nov. 2013)
- Major practice areas: Finance, corporate, funds, litigation/insolvency, international practice
- Date founded: 1994
- Founder: Hiroo Atsumi, Yutaka Sakai
- Website: http://www.aplaw.jp/en/

Atsumi & Sakai (渥美坂井法律事務所, Atsumi Sakai Hōritsu Jimusho) is a law firm in Tokyo, Japan. The firm has five formal practice groups: finance, corporate, funds, litigation/insolvency, and international practice.

Diet member and former Minister of State for Financial Services Yuji Yamamoto is an advisor to the firm.

The firm was founded in 1994 as Atsumi & Usui by a group of lawyers led by Hiroo Atsumi who left the firm of Blakemore & Mitsuki. The firm was known as Atsumi & Partners from 2003. It was the first Japanese law firm to register as a joint venture between Japanese and foreign lawyers in 2005. The firm adopted its current name in 2010 after absorbing a practice group from TMI Associates. In 2011, Atsumi partner Hiroaki Takahashi and several associates left the firm to join the Tokyo office of the Canadian law firm Davis LLP, now known as Davis & Takahashi. In 2013, the firm formed a joint venture with the German law practice of Markus Janssen.
