= Lewis Brisbois Bisgaard & Smith =

American law firm based in Los Angeles

Lewis Brisbois Bisgaard & Smith LLP
- Headquarters: U.S. Bank Tower; Los Angeles, California, U.S.
- No. of offices: 58 (2026)
- No. of attorneys: 1,552 (2024)
- Major practice areas: General practice, litigation, business, entertainment, finance, insurance, international
- Revenue: $720 million (2023)
- Profit per equity partner: $1.142 million (2023)
- Date founded: 1979; 47 years ago
- Company type: LLP
- Website: lewisbrisbois.com

Lewis Brisbois Bisgaard & Smith LLP (commonly referred to as Lewis Brisbois) is a U.S. law firm headquartered in Los Angeles, California. Founded in 1979, the firm is a national, general practice law firm with 1,552 attorneys. The firm operates 55 offices in 32 states and Washington, D.C.

The firm was ranked 71st in the United States (83rd in the world) in 2023, based on revenue, and 15th in the U.S. based on number of attorneys. In 2023, the firm reported $720 million in revenue. While the firm's roots are in the area of insurance defense litigation, it has increasingly expanded into corporate and transactional areas and now represents clients in a wide range of legal services. The firm has an international practices group, which serves China, Italy, Japan and South Korea.

== History ==
=== Lewis D’Amato Brisbois & Bisgaard ===
The firm was founded in 1979 in Los Angeles, originally as Lewis D’Amato Brisbois & Bisgaard. The firm expanded to San Francisco in 1982, and from 1983 to 1993, expanded throughout California. In 2002, the firm officially changed its name to Lewis Brisbois Bisgaard & Smith LLP with the opening of a New York City office, its first location outside of California.

=== Lewis Brisbois Bisgaard & Smith ===
In 2002, the firm had 640 lawyers in seven offices. In 2007, the firm had 442 lawyers in 31 offices. In 2009, The American Lawyer reported that 46% of the lawyers and 27% of the partners, at the firm were women. In 2013, with 270 lawyers, Lewis Brisbois had the most lawyers of any law firm in Los Angeles County, California. In 2014, 30% of the firm's partners were women (the industry average was 21%). In 2017, 26% of the firm's lawyers were minorities (the industry average was 14%), and 21% of its partners were minorities (the industry average was 9%).

Following the 2022 Russian invasion of Ukraine, Lewis Brisbois began to advise clients on issues arising from the conflict, including economic sanctions compliance.

In May 2023, Robert Lewis, a founding partner of the firm, stepped down as chairman of the firm, and became chairman emeritus. The firm's management committee elected former vice chairman Gregory Katz to succeed Lewis as managing partner.

In May 2023, 140 lawyers left the firm to join Barber Ranen, a boutique employment firm that had been recently opened by John Barber and Jeff Ranen, who had left Lewis Brisbois after leading its employment practices group and serving as members of the firm's management committee; both had worked over two decades at the firm. Ranen explained their departure from Lewis Brisbois saying: "We wanted to lead with empathy, collaboration and compassion," and Barber said "excellence and culture" were their driving forces. In June 2023, Lewis Brisbois released dozens of emails that John Barber and Jeff Ranen had written while employed there, which included racist, antisemitic, homophobic, and violently misogynistic slurs aimed at colleagues, clients, attorneys from other firms, and judges, referred to a Los Angeles County Superior Court judge as "sugar tits," and when Ranen reported to Barber that a firm employee had requested overtime, Barber replied: “Kill her by anal penetration.” Barber and Ranen resigned from the firm named after them at the firm's request, and the firm was renamed Daugherty Lordan LLP. Lewis Brisbois received requests from between 10 and 20 lawyers who asked to return, and took some of them back. Managing Partner Gregory S. Katz stated, “We hired a DEI consultant who spent a lot of time with our team, from senior leadership to rank and file members of our team, learning more about the organization, training us, and teaching us[.]”

== Offices ==
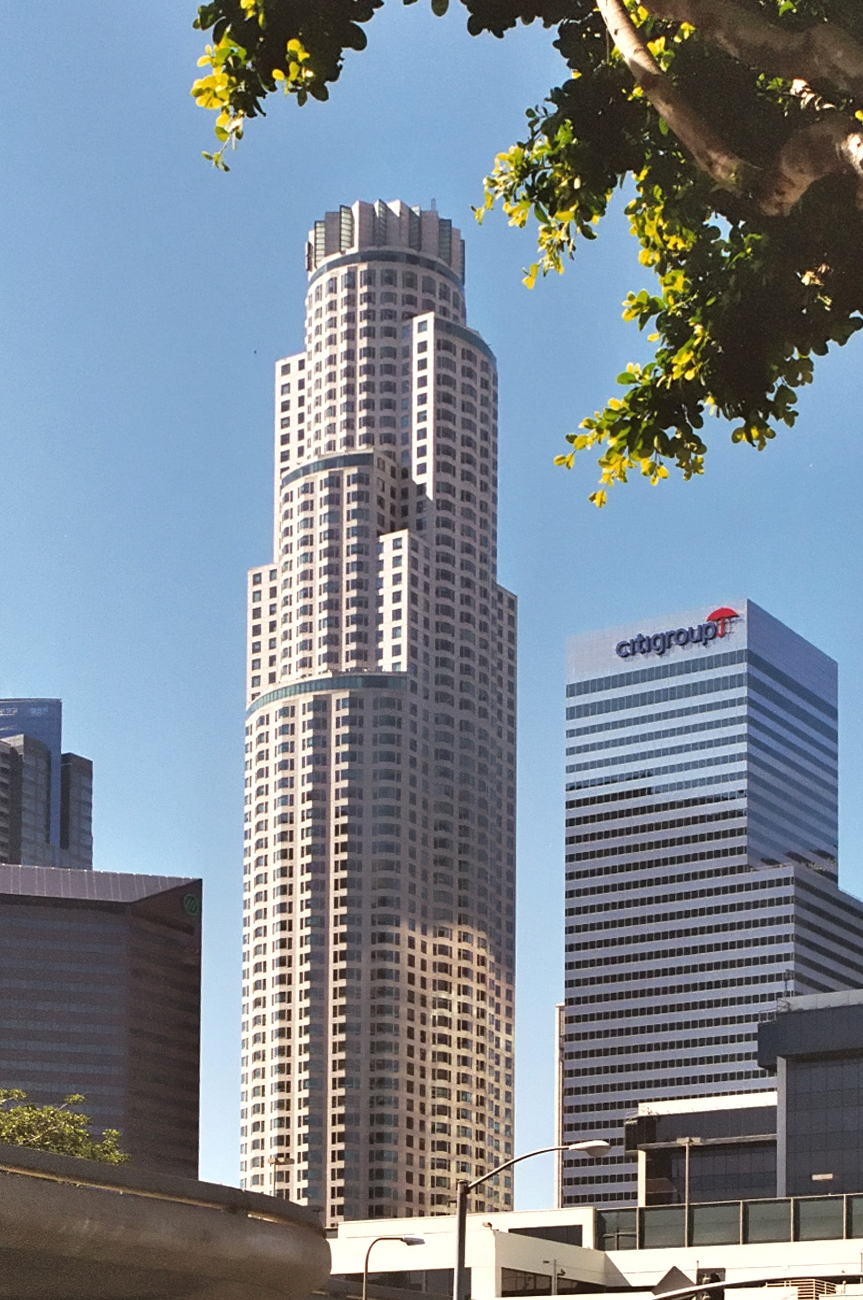
Lewis Brisbois' largest office is located at the U.S. Bank Tower in Los Angeles.

Lewis Brisbois has 58 offices in 33 states and Washington, D.C., including:

- Akron, Ohio
- Albuquerque, New Mexico
- Atlanta, Georgia
- Baltimore, Maryland
- Boise, Idaho
- Boston, Massachusetts
- Charleston, West Virginia
- Charlotte, North Carolina
- Chicago, Illinois
- Cincinnati, Ohio
- Cleveland, Ohio
- Costa Mesa, California
- Dallas, Texas
- Denver, Colorado
- Edwardsville, Illinois
- Fort Lauderdale, Florida
- Garden City, New York
- Hartford, Connecticut
- Highland, Indiana
- Houston, Texas
- Indian Wells, California
- Indianapolis, Indiana
- Jackson, Mississippi
- Kansas City, Missouri
- Lafayette, Louisiana
- Las Vegas, Nevada
- Lexington, Kentucky
- Los Angeles, California
- Miami, Florida
- Minneapolis, Minnesota
- Nashville, Tennessee
- New Orleans, Louisiana
- New York City, New York
- Newark, New Jersey
- Phoenix, Arizona
- Pittsburgh, Pennsylvania
- Portland, Oregon
- Providence, Rhode Island
- Raleigh, North Carolina
- Reno, Nevada
- Roanoke, Virginia
- Sacramento, California
- Salt Lake City, Utah
- San Bernardino, California
- San Diego, California
- San Francisco, California
- Savannah, Georgia
- Seattle, Washington
- St. Louis, Missouri
- Tampa, Florida
- Temecula, California
- Walnut Creek, California
- Washington, D.C.
- Wayne, Pennsylvania
- Weirton, West Virginia
- Westchester County, New York
- Wichita, Kansas
- Wilmington, Delaware

== Rankings ==
With $720 million gross revenue in 2023, the firm placed 71st on The American Lawyer's 2024 Am Law 200 ranking. With over 1,500 attorneys in 2024, the firm placed 18th on The National Law Journal's NLJ 500 ranking.

== Notable clients and cases ==
- BMW in an appellate matter stemming from a class action suit claiming that the plaintiffs overpaid for their BMW i3 vehicles because these vehicles had a purportedly defective range extender feature.
- BNSF Railway in a case arising from the Illinois Biometric Information Privacy Act.
- Brightline West in its construction of a high-speed rail route linking the Las Vegas, Nevada and Rancho Cucamonga, California.
- Calidi Biotherapeutics in its $335 million merger with First Light Acquisition Group.
- Los Angeles Metropolitan Transit Authority (Metro), Skanska|Traylor|Shea, and the City of Beverly Hills in a lawsuit filed by Temple of the Arts in response to the D Line Extension.
- Maserati in a proposed class action suit concerning the manufacturer’s Ghibli model's remote keyless entry system.
- Suzuki in a product liability matter stemming from a motorcycle front brake master cylinder failure.

== Notable attorneys and alumni ==
=== Business ===
- Andrew Puzder – former chief executive officer of CKE Restaurants, and President-elect Donald Trump's 2016 nominee to be the United States Secretary of Labor

=== Government ===
- Virna Luque – Panama's President José Raúl Mulino's Vice-Minister for the Ministry of the Presidency

=== Media and entertainment ===
- Dennis Holahan – former actor

== See also ==
- List of largest law firms by profits per partner
- List of largest law firms by revenue
- List of largest United States–based law firms by head count
