= Advokatfirman Vinge =

Swedish law firm

Vinge is one of Sweden's two largest law firms and one of Europe's 100 largest law firms, with approximately 300 lawyers working in the firm and an annual turnover of about 936 million SEK (about 100 million euro). The current firm was created by a merger of several smaller Swedish law firms in 1983. It became one of the biggest law firms in the Nordic countries after merging with Sandström in 1990. They have been the largest Nordic law firm in the field of mergers and acquisitions, and considered among the best Swedish business law firms.

Vinges offices in Sweden are located in Stockholm, Gothenburg, Malmö and Helsingborg, and the international offices are located in Brussels and Shanghai. It has also had offices in London and Hong Kong.
