= Fidal =

- Headquarters: Paris, France
- No. of offices: Approx. 90
- No. of attorneys: Approx. 1,200
- No. of employees: Approx. 1,300
- Key people: François de Laâge de Meux (Chairman)
- Revenue: €367 million (2018)
- Date founded: 1922
- Company type: Société d'exercice libéral par actions simplifiée (SELAS)
- Website: fidal.fr

Fidal is a French business law firm with over 1400 lawyers. It is the largest France-based law firm by revenues, and one of 100 largest law firms in the world by revenues.

In September 2014, Fidal formed an exclusive "best friends" alliance with the British law firm Mills & Reeve.
