= Noyes Leech =

American legal academic

Noyes E. Leech
- Born: August 1, 1921; Ambler, Pennsylvania
- Died: July 1, 2010 (aged 88); Philadelphia, Pennsylvania
- Title: the Ferdinand Wakeman Hubbell professor of law and the William A. Schnader professor of law

Academic background
- Education: University of Pennsylvania (BA 1943); University of Pennsylvania Law School (JD 1948)

Academic work
- Institutions: University of Pennsylvania Law School

Noyes E. Leech (August 1, 1921 – July 1, 2010) was an American lawyer and professor.

== Early life and education ==
Leech was born in Ambler, Pennsylvania, to Charles Sherman and Margaret (Reid) Leech.

He attended Lower Merion High School (1939), and received his BA from the University of Pennsylvania in 1943, and his JD from the University of Pennsylvania Law School in 1948. During Leech's third year of law school, he served as editor-in-chief of the University of Pennsylvania Law Review. While pursuing the study of law, Leech reestablished the Mitchell Club as a diverse group of fellow legal students.

== Career ==
Leech worked at the law firm of Dechert, Price & Rhoads, and practiced law privately in Philadelphia. From 1943 to 1945 he was a staff sergeant in the U.S. Army.

Leech was the Ferdinand Wakeman Hubbell professor of law and the William A. Schnader professor of law at the University of Pennsylvania Law School.

He was Editor of the Restatement of the Foreign Relations Law of the United States (1965).
