= CMS (law firm) =

International law firm

CMS Legal Services EEIG
- Headquarters: Frankfurt, Germany
- No. of offices: Approx. 80
- No. of attorneys: ▲5800
- No. of employees: ▲9000
- Major practice areas: Banking and finance; Capital markets; Fintech; Corporate and M&A; Litigation & dispute resolution; Real estate; Tax, pensions and employment
- Key people: Pierre-Sébastien Thill (Chairman); Stephan Millar (Executive Partner)
- Revenue: ▲$ 2.065 billions
- Date founded: 20 December 1999; 26 years ago
- Company type: Private (european economic interest grouping) with 18 member firms
- Website: cms.law

CMS is an international law firm that offers legal and tax advisory services. CMS coordinates the activities of its members through CMS Legal Services EEIG, a european economic interest grouping. It consists of 18 independent law firms, with about 80 offices worldwide.

== History ==
In 1999, six European law firms with 1,400+ lawyers and roughly DM 500 million in joint revenues came together to form CMS. The CMS brand combined the names of two founding law firms, Cameron McKenna (UK) and Hasche Sigle (Germany). Under the CMS brand, which initially drew criticism, a "partnership of partnerships" emerged. The member law firms retained their established names.

Initially, CMS included law firms from Germany, the Netherlands, Austria, and the United Kingdom, among others. Over the course of the 2000s, additional law firms joined from other countries.

In 2008, the law firm opened its first joint office in Russia. It merged with Nabarro and Olswang in 2016.

CMS is part of the Society of Media Lawyers, an industry group of law firms that specialize in libel lawsuits and which lobbied against anti-SLAPP ( Strategic lawsuit against public participation) legislation.

=== Russia ===
CMS was involved in legal action against Financial Times journalist Catherine Belton and her publisher HarperCollins over her book Putin's People.

In April 2022, CMS law firm was named alongside Harbour Litigation Funding by Kevin Hollinrake MP, in a letter to the Chancellor of the Exchequer Rishi Sunak MP, as two professional services firms acting for the benefit of Russian state entities during the invasion of Ukraine. The letter highlighted that both Harbour and CMS are working on behalf of the Russian state-owned DIA to bypass sanction regimes and obtain funds and assets from abroad in order to fund the invasion of Ukraine.

CMS was named by U.S. congressman Steve Cohen as doing "unscrupulous" work for Russia that undermined democratic values and strengthened the Vladimir Putin regime in Russia. CMS rejected allegations of impropriety and said the firm had not accepted new instructions from individuals associated with the Putin regime.

== See also ==
- List of largest law firms by revenue
- List of largest Europe-based law firms by revenue
