= Hammonds =

International law firm headquartered in United Kingdom

Hammonds LLP
- Headquarters: Leeds, United Kingdom
- No. of offices: 11
- No. of lawyers: Approx. 460 (2010)
- No. of employees: Approx. 1,015 (2010)
- Major practice areas: Full-service commercial practice
- Revenue: £118 million (2010)
- Profit per equity partner: £364,000 (2010)
- Date founded: 1887
- Company type: Limited Liability Partnership
- Dissolved: 1 January 2011

Hammonds LLP, also known as Hammonds Suddards, was an international law firm headquartered in Leeds, United Kingdom, with offices in Beijing, Berlin, Birmingham, Bradford, Brussels, Hong Kong, Leeds, Madrid, Manchester, Munich and Paris. The firm had associate relationships with Rossotto, Colombatto & Partners in Italy and with Zhigachoff in Russia (with offices in Moscow and St Petersburg).

Hammonds merged with the US-based law firm Squire, Sanders & Dempsey in January 2011, and subsequently became part of Squire Patton Boggs.

== History ==
Hammonds' origins dated back to the founding of a legal practice in Yorkshire in 1887. In 1989 Hammond Suddards represented South Yorkshire Police during and after the Hillsborough disaster. The firm wrote a letter saying that it would like police inspector Robert Purdy to review his original statement about the events, "to reduce the graphic content and render it rather more prosaic and factual".

In 2000 Hammond Suddards and Edge Ellison merged, forming Hammond Suddards Edge, at that time the 11th-largest law firm in the UK. The firm was ranked 20th in the UK by turnover in The Lawyer UK 100 2006, with a turnover of £132 million. From 2005 to 2009, the firm underwent significant restructuring under the stewardship of Managing Partner Peter Crossley. As of 2009, the partnership consisted of approximately 180 partners and over 1,000 employees. Hammonds converted to a Limited Liability Partnership in May 2008.

Hammonds and the United States–based law firm Squire, Sanders & Dempsey announced that they were in merger talks in August 2010. The partnerships of both firms voted in favour of a merger in November 2010, and it was completed on 1 January 2011.

== See also ==
- List of largest United Kingdom-based law firms
- List of companies based in London
