= Isao Imai (judge) =

Japanese judge

Isao Imai (今井 功, Imai Isao; born December 26, 1939) is a Japanese attorney-at-law (a counsel of TMI Associates) and was a member of the Supreme Court of Japan.
