= Watson Farley & Williams =

International law firm based in London

Watson Farley & Williams LLP
- Headquarters: London, England
- No. of offices: 19
- Major practice areas: Energy & Infrastructure, Maritime, Natural Resources, Real Estate and Transport
- Revenue: ▲£238.4 million (2023/24)
- Date founded: 1982
- Company type: LLP
- Website: www.wfw.com

Watson Farley & Williams (WFW) is an international law firm based in London. Founded in 1982, the firm specializes in legal services for the energy, infrastructure, maritime, transport, real estate and natural resources sectors. As of 2023, Watson Farley & Williams operates 19 offices and employs more than 800 attorneys.

== History ==
From its beginnings in shipping and shipping finance in 1982, Watson Farley & Williams has developed a broader practice: energy and infrastructure, maritime, natural resources, real estate and transport. The firm regularly advises large-scale clients in cross border matters.

Expanding geographically with 19 offices in Europe, Asia and the United States, the most recent office openings were in Sydney (July 2021), Seoul (February 2023) and Tokyo (April 2023).

Watson Farley & Williams opened an office in Hong Kong, in association with Lau, Leong & Co., in March 2012.

Watson Farley & Williams opened an office in Frankfurt in January 2013 with a regulatory team focusing on the energy, infrastructure and real estate sectors.

Watson Farley & Williams opened an office in Dubai, in September 2014.

Watson Farley & Williams announced in October 2015 that it had agreed an association and cooperation arrangement with Hanoi-based boutique firm LVN & Associates.

== See also ==
- List of largest UK law firms
- List of largest European law firms
