= Nabarro LLP =

Law firms of the United Kingdom

- Headquarters: London, United Kingdom
- No. of offices: Six
- No. of lawyers: Approximately 400
- Major practice areas: General practice
- Revenue: £126 million (2014/15)
- Profit per equity partner: £576,000 (2014/15)
- Date founded: 1958 (London)
- Company type: Limited liability partnership
- Website: nabarro.com

Nabarro LLP was an international law firm headquartered in London, United Kingdom. In 2014/15 it achieved total revenues of £126 million, making it the 34th-largest UK-based law firm by this measurement, and profits per equity partner of £576,000. It is part of an international alliance with other independent law firms covering Germany, France, Italy, Spain and the UK.

== History ==
The origins of Nabarro go back to just after the Second World War. By 1958, the principals, Leslie Nathanson, Felix Nabarro and his brother Alan Nabarro, had merged their firms to form an eight partner, sixty employee firm advising on property, litigation, company commercial and family law matters under the name Nabarro Nathanson.

In 1990, Nabarro Nathanson acquired the legal team of the British Coal Corporation, which comprised 125 lawyers. In the same year the firm established an alliance with the U.S.-based law firm Weil, Gotshal & Manges, which was subsequently dissolved in 1995.

Various mergers and office moves in the West End of London culminated in the firm's relocation in November 1999 to Holborn in central London.

In February 2007, the firm changed its name from Nabarro Nathanson to Nabarro and launched its new brand with an associated strapline 'Clarity Matters'. In January 2008, Nabarro partners voted in favour of the firm converting to a limited liability partnership, with the change occurring in March of that year.

In October 2014, Nabarro moved to new offices in London Wall.

From May 2017 the firm ceased to exist independently after being merged into CMS.

== Main practice areas ==
Nabarro's main practice areas include:

- Banking & Finance
- Corporate
- Dispute Resolution
- Employment
- Environment
- EU Competition & Trade
- Financial Services Regulatory
- Funds & Indirect Real Estate
- Health & Safety
- Infrastructure, Construction & Energy
- Intellectual Property
- Pensions
- Planning
- Public Sector
- Real Estate
- Real Estate Dispute Resolution
- Regulatory
- Restructuring & Insolvency
- Tax

== Offices ==
Nabarro has offices in London, Sheffield, Manchester, Brussels, Singapore and Dubai.
