= Harbour Litigation Funding =

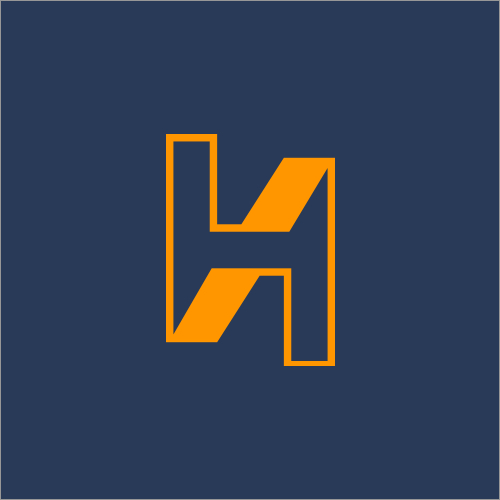
- Industry: Litigation funding
- Founded: 2007; 18 years ago
- Founders: Susan Dunn; Martin Tonnby
- Headquarters: London, United Kingdom
- Website: harbourlitigationfunding.com

Harbour Litigation Funding or 'Harbour' is one of the UK's first litigation funders and one of the largest litigation funders in the world, measured by the size of its investment funds.

== History and operation ==
Harbour was founded in 2007 by Susan Dunn and Martin Tonnby. The origins of the business date back to 2002. It operates hubs in London and has funded litigation in 13 jurisdictions and arbitration under 4 arbitral rules. Harbour is authorised and regulated by the Financial Conduct Authority. Litigation funders pay all or part of the costs of a dispute. If the case is won and monies received, they take a pre-agreed share of the proceeds. If the case is lost, the loss is the funder's - not the claimant's.

== Association of Litigation Funders ==
The Civil Justice Council approved a regulatory body responsible for litigation funding and ensuring compliance with the Code. That body is called the Association of Litigation Funders.

Harbour is a founding member of the Association of Litigation Funders.
