= List of largest Canadian law firms =

This is a list of the largest Canada-based law firms by revenue in 2023.

| Canada Rank | Global Rank | Name | Revenue (US$) | Revenue per Lawyer (RPL, US$) | Total Lawyers | Profit per Equity Partner (PEP, US$) | Total Equity Partners | Leverage | Headquarters | Number of offices | Year established |
|---|---|---|---|---|---|---|---|---|---|---|---|
| N/A | 88 | Gowling WLG | 713,683,000 | 565,000 | 1,263 | 704,000 | 396 | N/A | Ottawa, ON and London, UK | 20 | 2016 international merger |
| 1 | 90 | Blakes | 692,794,000 | 994,000 | 697 | 986,000 | 274 | N/A | Toronto, ON | 7 | 1856 |
| 2 | 99 | McCarthy | 635,000,000 | 844,000 | 752 | 1,418,000 | 170 | N/A | Toronto, ON | 7 | 1855 |
| 3 | 111 | Fasken | 579,938,000 | 647,000 | 897 | N/A | N/A | N/A | Toronto, ON | 10 | 2000 merger |
| 4 | 130 | Osler | 479,904,000 | 882,000 | 544 | N/A | N/A | N/A | Toronto, ON | 6 | 1862 |
| 5 | 138 | BLG | 443,658,000 | 553,000 | 803 | N/A | N/A | N/A | Toronto, ON | 5 | 2000 merger |
| 6 | 142 | Bennett Jones | 425,000,000 | 895,000 | 475 | N/A | N/A | N/A | Calgary, AB and Toronto, ON | 7 | 1922 |
| 7 | 161 | Stikeman | 368,756,000 | 713,000 | 517 | N/A | N/A | N/A | Montreal, QC and Toronto, ON | 8 | 1952 |
| 8 | 192 | Torys | 294,403,000 | 773,000 | 381 | N/A | N/A | N/A | Toronto, ON | 4 | 1941 |
| 9 | 199 | Miller Thomson | 282,274,000 | 563,000 | 501 | N/A | N/A | N/A | Toronto, ON | 11 | 1957 |

== Canada's Largest Law Firms ==
Lexpert Magazine publishes a yearly list of The 30 Largest Law Firms in Canada ranked by total number of lawyers.

| Rank | Name | Total Number of Lawyers | Toronto | Ottawa | Montréal | Vancouver | Calgary | Edmonton | Québec City | Other Cities |
|---|---|---|---|---|---|---|---|---|---|---|
| 2 | BLG | 795 | 288 | 83 | 155 | 135 | 134 | - | - | - |
| 1 | Fasken | 890 | 301 | 31 | 278 | 149 | 48 | - | 55 | 7 Surrey, BC |
| 3 | McCarthy | 714 | 350 | - | 167 | 87 | 80 | - | 30 | |
| 4 | Gowling WLG | 698 | 179 | 187 | 86 | 67 | 90 | - | - | 38 Hamilton, ON; 51 Waterloo, ON |
| 5 | Blakes | 652 | 346 | 7 | 84 | 106 | 109 | - | - | - |
| 6 | Norton Rose Fulbright | 640 | 157 | 45 | 165 | 96 | 116 | - | 61 | |
| 7 | Dentons | 580 | 164 | 33 | 99 | 77 | 108 | 99 | - | - |
| 8 | Miller Thomson | 528 | 171 | - | 73 | 63 | 42 | 54 | - | 16 Guelph, ON; 16 London, ON; 31 Vaughan, ON; 31 Waterloo, ON; 21 Regina, SK; 10 Saskatoon, SK |
| 9 | Osler | 485 | 288 | 33 | 64 | 32 | 68 | - | - | - |
| 10 | Stikeman | 472 | 218 | 9 | 149 | 41 | 55 | - | - | - |

== See also ==
- List of largest law firms by revenue
- List of largest United States-based law firms by profits per partner
- List of largest United Kingdom-based law firms by revenue
- List of largest Europe-based law firms by revenue
- List of largest Japan-based law firms by head count
- List of largest China-based law firms by revenue
