= Osborne Clarke =

London-based law firm

- Headquarters: London, England, UK
- No. of offices: 25
- No. of lawyers: 1220+
- No. of employees: Approx 2,440
- Major practice areas: Energy and utilities, Financial services, Life sciences and healthcare, Real estate and Infrastructure, Recruitment, Retail and consumer, Tech, Media and Comms, Transport and Automotive
- Key people: Conrad Davies (Managing Partner); Peter Clough (Senior Partner)
- Date founded: 1748
- Company type: Swiss association
- Website: osborneclarke.com

Osborne Clarke is an international legal practice headquartered in London, England, UK with offices in the United Kingdom, Germany, Italy, Belgium, Spain, Sweden, France, the Netherlands, China, India via BTG Advaya, Singapore, the United States and Poland. The firm has over 320 partners and more than 2,440 employees spread across its 25 offices around the world. The firm's headquarters are located in London, United Kingdom.

The firm was involved in the development of the railways in Southern England through its historic relationship with Isambard Kingdom Brunel and the Great Western Railway.

== History ==
Osborne Clarke was founded in Bristol, England, in 1748 by Jeremiah Osborne. In 1987 Osborne Clarke opened its first London office. Over the next decade the firm opened offices in Reading, Cologne, Munich and Silicon Valley.

The law firm played a significant part in the development of the railways in the UK when it was appointed to represent the Great Western Railway Company, working closely with Isambard Kingdom Brunel on the establishment of the Great Western Main Line route from London Paddington to Bristol and the West Country. The nature of the relationship between Osborne Clarke and Brunel is best highlighted by one notable occasion when Jeremiah Osborne the Third (grandson to the founder) is said to have personally rowed Brunel down the River Avon to survey the bank for the route of the Great Western Railway.

The partnership's recent history has been characterised by two strands of development. Firstly, they have undertaken significant international expansion, particularly into the United States and Germany where they are now the 41st largest law firm. On 9 July 2012 the firm announced that two European firms, SLA Studio Legale Associato in Italy and Spanish firm Osborne Clarke Spain, had become part of Osborne Clarke.

Secondly the firm has seen considerable expansion in the media and technology sectors, in which they are considered a tier 1 firm. Notable clients in this sector include Yahoo!, Facebook, Dell, PwC, Google, Pokémon Company and Tripadvisor.

In 2015 Osborne Clarke was named The Lawyer's firm of the year.

In 2019 the firm was awarded the Best Corporate Culture Award at the Managing Partners Forum (MAP) Awards.

=== Key dates ===
- 1748 – Jeremiah Osborne starts practising law in Bristol.
- 1833 – Firm works closely with Isambard Kingdom Brunel on the building of the Great Western Railway. The firm remains the company's solicitor for many years.
- 1969 – The modern firm is created by the merger of the Osborne and Clarke law firms.
- 1987 – Firm opens its London office – the first regional law firm to do so.
- 1998 – Opens Thames Valley office in Reading.
- 2000 – Opens Silicon Valley office in Palo Alto, California.
- 2001 – Opens office in Cologne, Germany.
- 2012 – Merges with Italian and Spanish firms, gaining offices in Milan, Rome, Padua, Brescia, Madrid and Barcelona.
- 2013 – Opens in Brussels, Paris and New York.
- 2014 – Opens in San Francisco, Amsterdam, Hong Kong. and Mumbai.
- 2016 – Opens in Singapore.
- 2017 – Opens in Mainland China, Sweden and Bangalore.
- 2019 – Relationship firm BTG Legal opens office in Delhi. BTG Legal subsequently merged with Advaya Legal to form BTG Advaya in 2023.

== Structure ==
After expanding significantly through the dot-com bubble of the late nineties and early 2000s, the firm has undergone a comprehensive restructure. The firm retains a comprehensive range of departments, however Osborne Clarke is considered a first tier firm in both the Media and Entertainment and Brand Management sectors.

== Management ==
International Council chairman Stefan Rizor has been re-elected for a second term. Omar Al-Nuaimi is the International CEO.

== Key industry sectors ==
The firm has established a reputation for working in a number of sectors, but references the following list on their corporate website:

- Energy and Utilities
- Financial Services
- Life Sciences and Healthcare
- Real Estate and Infrastructure
- Workforce Solutions
- Retail and Consumer
- Tech, Media and Comms
- Transport and Automotive

== Notable cases ==
- Osborne Clarke acted on behalf of Carphone Warehouse on the £2 billion demerger of its fixed line business TalkTalk.
- Osborne Clarke advised London & Continental Railways and Eurostar International Limited on the development of St Pancras station, London as an international rail terminal.
- Osborne Clarke advised Babcock Marine on £1 billion defence contracts, including the £560 million extension of the Warship Support Modernisation Initiative.
- Osborne Clarke advised Grand Central on its sale to Arriva.
- Osborne Clarke advised CBRE Global Investors on the £161.5m sale and leaseback of Park Plaza London Waterloo
- Osborne Clarke acted for the management team of Odeon & UCI Cinema Group in December 2016 on the £921m sale of Odeon & UCI by private equity firm Terra Firma.
- Osborne Clarke advised Grifols on a $6.3bn refinancing; the second largest refinancing of a Spanish company in history.
