= Gordon Rees Scully Mansukhani =

American law firm

Gordon Rees Scully Mansukhani, LLP
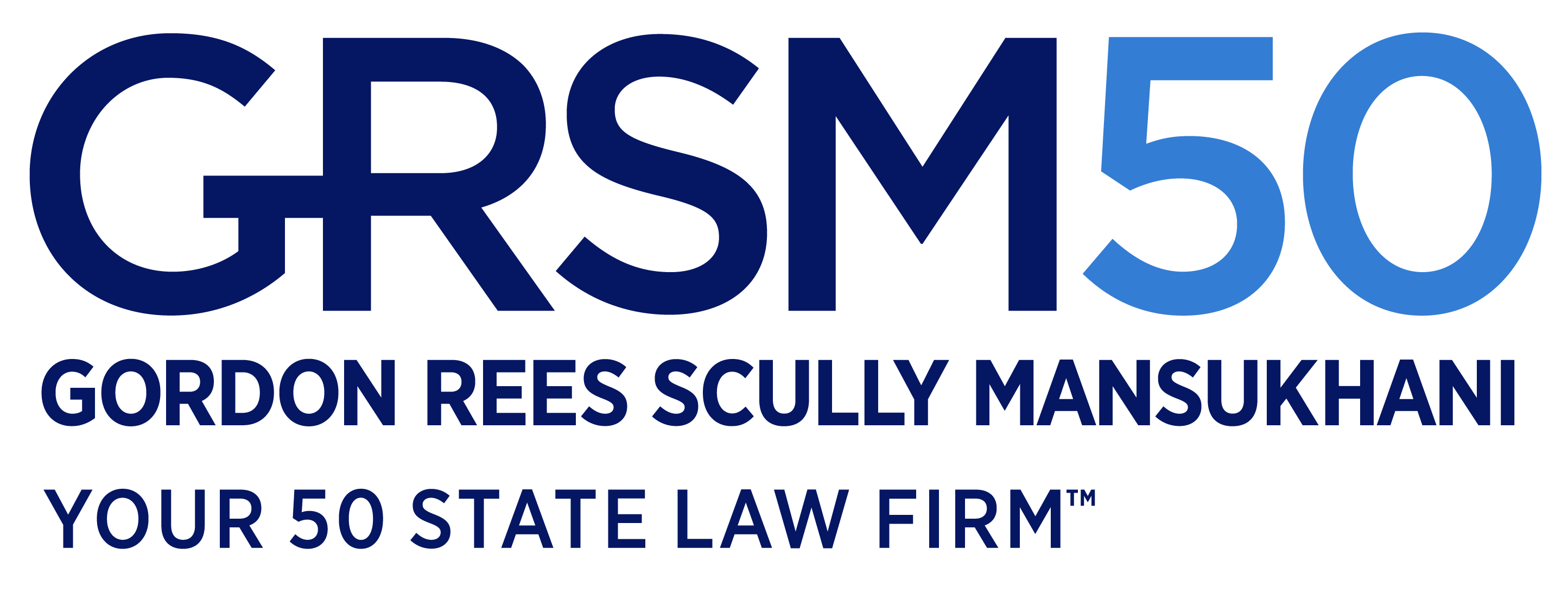
- Headquarters: San Francisco, California, U.S.
- No. of offices: 87 (2026)
- No. of attorneys: 2,000+
- Key people: Adam Sugarman (Managing Partner); Miles Scully (Name Partner); Roger Mansukhani (Name Partner); Dion Cominos (Chairman/Managing Partner 2006-2026)
- Date founded: 1974
- Founder: Donald W. Rees †; Stuart M. Gordon
- Company type: Limited liability partnership
- Website: www.grsm.com

Gordon Rees Scully Mansukhani, LLP, commonly referred to as "Gordon Rees" or "GRSM", is an AmLaw 100 law firm headquartered in San Francisco, California. The firm has more than 2,000 lawyers practicing in the United States across all 50 states.

== History ==
In 1974, Stuart Gordon and Donald Rees founded the firm as Gordon & Rees in San Francisco. In 2014, the name of the firm was expanded to Gordon Rees Scully Mansukhani, adding Miles Scully and Roger Mansukhani as named partners. The firmwide managing partner from 2006 through 2026 was Dion Cominos, who has been with GRSM since 1987. On June 8, 2026, Adam Sugarman took over as firmwide managing partner.

In 2019, GRSM opened their 68th office in Hawaii, claiming to be the first and only law firm in the nation's history to open offices in all 50 states. As such, the firm markets itself as combining the resources of a full-service national firm with the local knowledge of a regional firm. The firm provides comprehensive litigation and business transactions services to public and private companies. As of 2026, GRSM is the sixth largest law firm by headcount in the United States.

== Recognition ==
In 2025, Law360 recognized GRSM among the 15 largest law firms in the nation, according to the Law360 400 list. The firm ranked 70st in the 2026 AmLaw 100 list, which ranks law firms by gross revenue. In 2025, GRSM was also ranked #25 in the National Law Journal 500 rankings. Bloomberg Law has recognized GRSM among the fastest organically growing law firms in the U.S. Chambers USA has recognized the firm and the firm's partners in the areas of Banking & Finance, Construction, Litigation: General Commercial, Insurance: Dispute Resolution: Insurer, Insurance: Insurer, Insurance, Product Liability & Mass Torts, and Transportation: Shipping/Maritime Litigation. Construction Executive magazine ranked GRSM as the #4 construction law firm in the nation in 2024.

=== Practice Areas ===
U.S. News has given the firm Tier 1 rankings nationally and in metropolitan markets across 26 different practice areas.

GRSM's Services
Advertising & E-Commerce	Antitrust	Appellate
Artificial Intelligence	Aviation	Banking & Finance
Bankruptcy, Restructuring & Creditors' Rights	Blockchain & Cryptocurrency	Business Transactions
Cannabis, Hemp & CBD	Casualty	Class Action Defense
Commercial Litigation	Construction	Consumer Financial Services
Cyber, Privacy & Data Security	Defamation & First Amendment	Directors & Officers and Shareholder Litigation
Domestic Relations	Education	Employee Benefits & Executive Compensation
Employment	Energy & Natural Resources	Entertainment & Recreation
Environmental & Toxic Tort	Environmental Infrastructure Permitting	Equine
Estate & Trust Litigation	Food & Beverage	Franchise
Government Contracts	Government Investigations & Enforcement Defense	Healthcare
Immigration & Naturalization	Insurance	Intellectual Property Litigation
Intellectual Property Transactions	International Law	Labor
Medicare Compliance	Pharmaceutical & Medical Device	Privacy & Data Protection
Product Liability	Professional Liability Defense	Real Estate
Retail & Hospitality	Securities	Taxation
Technology Litigation	Transportation	Trial Practice
Tribal & Native American	Unfair Competition	Wealth Management, Probate & Asset Protection
White Collar Defense		

=== Diversity ===
GRSM has been recognized by The American Lawyer, Law360 and National Law Journal for its continued progress in increasing diversity in the legal profession.

GRSM was ranked #62 on Law360's 2025 Diversity Snapshot and #7 on the 2025 Women in Law Report among firms with more than 600 attorneys. Since 2016, the firm has also earned a 100 on the Corporate Equality Index national benchmarking survey and report on corporate policies and practices related to LGBT workplace equality, administered by the Human Rights Campaign Foundation.
