= Dechert =

American law firm

Dechert LLP
- Headquarters: Philadelphia, Pennsylvania
- No. of offices: 20
- Offices: Global
- No. of attorneys: approximately 1000 (2017)
- Major practice areas: General practice
- Key people: Co-Chairs: David Forti and Mark Thierfelder
- Revenue: ▲US$1.6 billion (2025)
- Profit per equity partner: ▲US$6.2 million (2025)
- Date founded: 1875
- Founder: Wayne MacVeagh and George Tucker Bispham
- Company type: Limited liability partnership
- Website: dechert.com

Dechert LLP (/ˈdɛkərt/; DECK-ərt) is a multinational American law firm of more than 900 lawyers with practices in corporate and securities, complex litigation, finance and real estate, financial services, asset management, and private equity. In 2021, the firm reached a revenue of $1.3 billion. On Law.com's 2022 Global 200 survey, Dechert ranked as the 41st highest-grossing law firm in the world.

== History ==
The firm's first predecessor, MacVeagh & Bispham, was formed in 1875 by Wayne MacVeagh and George Tucker Bispham. Over the next few decades, MacVeagh & Bispham and its successor represented a number of banks, railroads, insurance companies, and coal companies.

MacVeagh & Bispham's successor merged with another Philadelphia law firm, Dechert, Smith & Clark, in 1942. After several more name changes, the firm was known as Dechert Price & Rhoads from 1962 to 2000. In 2000, the firm shortened its name to Dechert. By the early 2000s, the firm included about 700 lawyers in 12 worldwide offices.

In 2011, Andrew J. Levander became chairman of the firm. At that time, Dechert had 747 lawyers and generated $671 million in annual revenue.

In the 2018 AmLaw Global 200 survey, Dechert ranked as the 43rd highest-grossing law firm in the world. In the same year, Dechert reached a settlement with two former payroll staffers over claims that it discriminated against certain staff members because of their sex and age. The two former payroll staffers at Dechert filed a complaint against the firm in 2017, claiming they experienced a culture of bias against older and female employees at the firm that led to their firing in 2016. They also alleged there was a "boys club" at the firm that gave beneficial treatment to younger male employees. Dechert claimed that it had laid off the two payroll staffers because Dechert upgraded its technology and outsourced the staffers' jobs. Previously, on the eve of trial, the firm and former associate Ariel Ayanna reached an eleventh-hour deal in a "macho culture" retaliation case. The attorney had claimed the firm fired him to get back at him for taking time off to care for his mentally ill wife and their newborn, The National Law Journal reported.

Financial Times ranked Dechert in the Top 10 Most Innovative Law Firms in 2019. In 2021, Dechert ranked 5th for the same recognition.

The UK Dechert unit was sued by former partner Monica Gogn for workplace discrimination due to race and sex. In 2020, an employment tribunal filing document stated that the proceedings leveled against "Dechert LLP & Others" were "dismissed following a withdrawal of the claim by the claimant". Dechert and an administrative services provider for the firm agreed in 2021 to settle claims by a former site manager in Washington, D.C. that he was subjected to discrimination and retaliation because he had a stroke, federal court records show.

In August 2022, Dechert's UK unit agreed to pay £20 million to a former client for compensation for damages caused by its former UK partner and white-collar crime head Neil Gerrard. The agreement came after a decade-long proceeding that resulted in the High Court finding in May 2022 that Dechert, its former white-collar crime head Gerrard, and the Serious Fraud Office (SFO) had committed acts of wrongdoing in their dealings with the law firm's then-client Eurasian Natural Resources Corporation (ENRC). London's High Court found that Dechert and Gerrard – who was "obsessed with making money" and "lost any real sense of objectivity, proportion or indeed loyalty to his client" had acted deliberately, or at least recklessly. The judge also ruled Gerrard committed a "gross and knowing breach of duty" as a solicitor by, among other things, disclosing confidential and privileged information to the SFO, and leaking to the media confidential documents of his client ENRC. He concluded in his judgment in 2022 that Gerrard was a "highly unreliable and at times dishonest witness" who was "plainly lying" about his contacts with the SFO. The judge found senior SFO officials breached their duties by holding a series of unauthorized meetings with Gerrard in which they received information that was plainly against former Dechert's client interests in what the judge described as a case of "bad faith opportunism". Gerrard allegedly referred to billing in the case as "rape mode". The firm now faces costs upwards of $50 million. As of 2023 Dechert is facing two more UK trials and two US lawsuits related to Gerrard. One lawsuit involves a claim under the Racketeer Influenced and Corrupt Organizations (RICO) Act, for its alleged role in an international "hack and dump scheme", which it denies. Media reported that regulators are probing the firm. The UK's Solicitors Regulation Authority has received several complaints.

The firm's profitability increased significantly in 2021, but fell in 2022. The firm ultimately placed 36th on the 2023 AmLaw 200 ranking, based on its 2022 revenue. At the end of 2022, Dechert announced that its leadership would be changing: David Forti and Mark Thierfelder would be taking over as co-chairs of the firm from Andrew J. Levander, who had chaired the firm since 2011, and Henry Nassau (Dechert's CEO since 2016) would be stepping down from that role. Under Levander and Nassau's leadership, Dechert had grown significantly in size and revenue.

In 2023 Dechert announced that it would cut 5% of its global workforce due to "faltering demand", as several other large law firms publicly confirmed cuts.

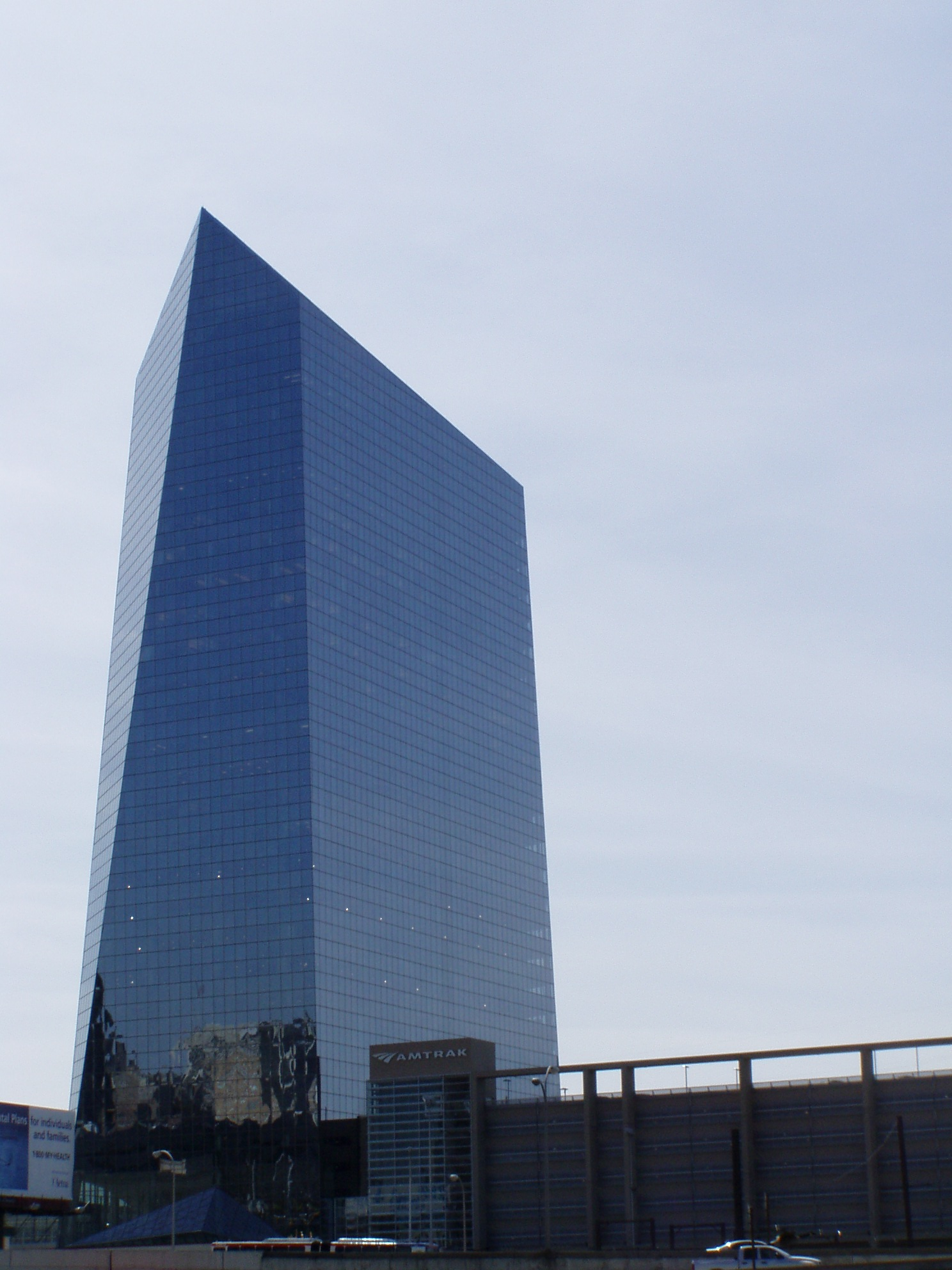
Dechert's headquarters moved to Philadelphia's Cira Centre in 2005

== Pro bono activities ==
Dechert has been recognized among the top 10 US law firms for pro bono work in The American Lawyer's Pro Bono Survey, an annual report that rates the nation's 200 highest-grossing law firms based on their level of pro bono activity. The report confirmed that it remained the top law firm for international pro bono work. In August 2014, Dechert received the American Bar Association's (ABA) Pro Bono Publico Award.

In 2020, Dechert received the ABA Business Law Section National Public Service Award. In 2021, the firm was rated first for international pro bono work by The American Lawyer.

== Notable lawyers and alumni ==
- Harvey Bartle III, chief judge of the US District Court for the Eastern District of Pennsylvania
- Joseph S. Clark, mayor of Philadelphia (1952–1956) and US senator for Pennsylvania (1957–1969)
- Q. Todd Dickinson, former Under Secretary of Commerce for Intellectual Property
- Steven Engel, deputy assistant attorney general for the Office of Legal Counsel under George W. Bush and US Assistant Attorney General for the Office of Legal Counsel in the first Donald Trump administration
- Glenn Fine, former inspector general of the US Department of Justice
- Miriam González Durántez, head of international trade practice
- Paul G. Haaga, Jr., vice chairman of Capital Research and Management Company, a constituent company of the Capital Group Companies
- David N. Kelley, former US Attorney and Deputy US Attorney for the US District Court for the Southern District of New York
- Cheryl Ann Krause, US Circuit Judge of the US Court of Appeals for the Third Circuit
- Noyes Leech (1921–2010), law professor at the University of Pennsylvania Law School
- Scooter Libby, chief of staff to Vice President Dick Cheney (2001–2005)
- Edward A. McDonald, portrayed himself as a federal prosecutor in Martin Scorsese's Goodfellas
- Mary A. McLaughlin, judge for the US District Court for the Eastern District of Pennsylvania
- Lisa Scottoline, New York Times best-selling author
- Norma Levy Shapiro, first woman partner and retired judge for the US District Court for the Eastern District of Pennsylvania
- Arlen Specter, US senator for Pennsylvania (1981–2011)

== See also ==
- List of largest United States-based law firms by profits per partner
