= Polsinelli =

American law firm

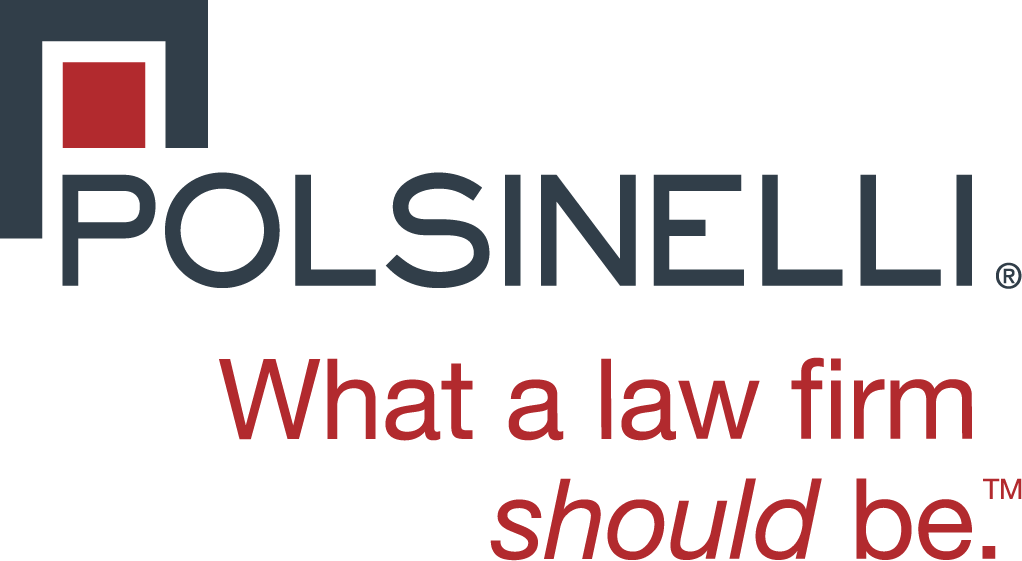
- No. of offices: 25+
- No. of attorneys: 1,200+
- Major practice areas: General practice
- Revenue: $1.21B (2025)
- Date founded: 1972 (Kansas City, Missouri)
- Company type: Professional Corporation

Polsinelli is an Am Law 100 firm with more than 1,200 attorneys in over 25 offices nationwide. The firm's attorneys focus on health care, finance, real estate, technology, private equity and life sciences.

== History ==
Polsinelli was founded in 1972 by Jim Polsinelli and two other young attorneys in a small office near the Plaza Theatre. The firm initially focused on business and real estate clients in the Country Club District in Kansas City, Missouri.

During the 1980s, the firm represented small businesses and entrepreneurs and expanded its litigation practice. In 1991, Polsinelli opened its first office outside Kansas City in St. Louis.

In 2000, the firm established a science and technology practice focused on patent and business matters in the biotechnology sector.

In 2003 the firm opened up a New York office, and in June of 2004, it merged with Suelthaus, PC, a 35-lawyer St. Louis-based entrepreneurial business law firm founded in 1929. The combination doubled the size of the firm's St. Louis office.

In July 2005, the firm opened an office in Washington, D.C., and in January 2006, Nasharr & Shea LLC, a banking and real estate firm, merged into Polsinelli, establishing the firm's Chicago office. In 2008, the firm opened an office in Wilmington, Delaware.

On February 1, 2009, Polsinelli merged with Shughart Thomson & Kilroy, P.C., a Kansas City-based, law firm. The merger added offices in Denver, Phoenix and St. Joseph and Springfield, Missouri.

In July 2011, Polsinelli expanded into California by acquiring attorneys and staff of Quateman LLP, a bond counsel firm founded in 1989 by Lisa Greer Quateman. The firm also opened an office in Dallas that year.

Polsinelli opened an Atlanta office in 2014 after acquiring Rafuse Hill & Hodges, followed by a San Francisco office. In 2015, the firm opened offices in Nashville, Tennessee, and Raleigh, North Carolina.

In March 2016, 44 intellectual property attorneys from Novak Druce Connolly Bove + Quigg joined Polsinelli, including Gregory Novak, Tracy Druce, and Q. Todd Dickinson. The move added offices in Houston, Boston, and Silicon Valley.

The firm opened a Seattle office in 2018, followed by offices in Miami in 2019 and Salt Lake City in 2022. In 2024, Polsinelli opened offices in Fort Worth, Texas, and Park City, Utah. Later that year, the firm hired 47 attorneys from Holland & Knight and opened an office in Philadelphia.

== Notable cases ==
- Reichle v. Howards - Case decided by the Supreme Court 8-0 in 2012 in which Secret Service detail of Dick Cheney had not infringed on protestor's free speech rights when they arrested him.
- Coach America bankruptcy and restructuring.

== Offices ==
Polsinelli is headquartered in Kansas City’s Plaza Vista building on the Country Club Plaza. Prior to that, the firm was headquartered in the Country Club Plaza in the Plaza Steppes building starting in 1991. Earlier it had been located in the Plaza Theatre building in the Plaza. Its attempts to move to a new headquarters in recent years have met with some controversy. In 2010 it proposed moving into a new 8-story glass tower at 47th and Broadway on the east side of the Plaza. That structure would have involved tearing down a vintage 1920s Plaza building in the Plaza's traditional low-rise Spanish style and replacing it with a glass highrise. The plan was eventually withdrawn after considerable protests.

In 2012, it announced plans to tear down the bankrupt and unfinished Moshe Safdie-designed West Edge building that had originally been built for Bob Bernstein on the west side of the Plaza and replace it with a 10-story structure designed by 360 Architecture called Plaza Vista. On February 12, 2013, a natural gas explosion in the gas line leading into JJ's Restaurant across the street from the project leveled the restaurant and heavily damaged the Plaza Vista's glass curtain wall. The Plaza Vista's roof also had to be replaced because of embers. Despite setbacks, contractors were able to finish the project and the firm was able to move into their new headquarters on November 1, 2013.
