= Simmons & Simmons =

London-based international law firm

- Headquarters: Citypoint, London; United Kingdom
- No. of offices: 23 worldwide
- No. of lawyers: 974
- Key people: Julian Taylor (Senior Partner); Emily Monastiriotis (Managing Partner)
- Revenue: ▲£615m
- Profit per equity partner: ▲£1.128m
- Date founded: September 1896
- Founder: Percy Simmons; Edward Simmons
- Company type: Limited liability partnership
- Website: www.simmons-simmons.com

Simmons & Simmons is an international law firm with headquarters in London, UK. About half of its staff are in the London office, in CityPoint, off Moorgate. The firm has practices covering asset management, investment funds, energy and infrastructure, finance, life sciences, technology, media, and telecommunications sectors.

== History ==
The firm was founded in 1896 by twin brothers, Percy (1875–1939) and Edward Simmons, while both were 21 years old.

Simmons & Simmons has since expanded internationally:

- 1962: Opened second office in Brussels
- 1979: Opened Hong Kong office, marking entry into Asia
- 1988: Opened office in Paris
- 1993: Expanded into Italy (Milan and Rome) through Grippo Associati e Simmons & Simmons
- 1994: Opened Abu Dhabi office, entering the Middle East
- 1995: Opened Shanghai office
- 2000: Opened Madrid office
- 2001: Opened offices in Düsseldorf and Tokyo; began alliance with TMI Associates in Japan
- 2002: Opened Frankfurt office and merged with Dutch firm Nolst Trenité in Rotterdam
- 2003: Opened Doha office; first international law firm licensed to operate independently in Qatar
- 2005: Opened Dubai office
- 2007: Expanded in Spain through merger with Mochales & Palacios; opened Amsterdam office
- 2011: Opened Beijing office
- 2012: Expanded in the United Kingdom with a Bristol office
- 2013: Opened offices in Singapore and Munich
- 2015: Opened Luxembourg office
- 2018: Opened Dublin office
- 2019: Opened Shenzhen office and acquired Wavelength, a legal engineering firm, establishing a presence in Cambridge
- 2022: Opened first United States office in Silicon Valley

== Clients ==
Clients include Enpal and Chelsea F.C. Simmons represented Enpal in its 2021 debt fundraising and 2022 financing rounds. Simmons & Simmons advised Chelsea F.C. in its £4.25bn sale to a consortium led by Todd Boehly and Clearlake Capital.

== See also ==
- List of largest law firms by revenue
- List of largest law firms by profits per partner
