= Holman Fenwick Willan =

UK law firm

HFW
- Headquarters: London, United Kingdom
- No. of offices: 22
- No. of lawyers: 700+ (190 partners)
- Major practice areas: Aerospace, Commodities, Construction, Energy and Resources, Insurance and Reinsurance, Shipping
- Date founded: 1883
- Company type: Limited liability partnership
- Website: hfw.com

HFW is a global, sector-focused law firm providing services to businesses in aerospace, commodities, construction, energy and resources, insurance and reinsurance, and shipping. The firm was founded in 1883 and now has more than 700 lawyers, including 190 partners, based in 22 offices across the Americas, Europe, the Middle East and Asia Pacific.

== History ==
HFW was founded in 1883, and its early expertise was representing maritime clients following shipwrecks and collisions. It has since broadened its practice to focus on six core sectors globally: aerospace, commodities, construction, energy and resources, insurance and reinsurance, and shipping. In June 2017, the firm changed its name from Holman Fenwick Willan to HFW.

HFW was one of the first London-based law firms to expand internationally, opening its first international office in 1977, in Paris. A year later, it became one of the first international law firms to open an office in Hong Kong. HFW then launched in Singapore in 1990, Piraeus in 1993 and Shanghai in 1999. It moved into Australia and the Middle East in 2006, opening offices in Melbourne and Dubai. HFW subsequently expanded its Australia presence, launching offices in Sydney in 2009 and Perth in 2011. It also opened offices in Brussels in 2009, Geneva in 2010 and São Paulo in 2011.

In June 2016, HFW became only the second international law firm to enter into a formal association with a Chinese law firm under the Shanghai Free Trade Zone rules.

In January 2017, the firm merged with US law firm Legge, Farrow, Kimmitt, McGrath & Brown. This was notable for being a fully integrated merger, whereas most transatlantic law firm combinations at the time used the Swiss Verein structure.

In June 2018, HFW expanded its Latin America presence by entering into a cooperation arrangement with a new Brazilian law firm, Costa, Albino & Lasalvia (CAL).

In October 2018, the firm opened in Abu Dhabi with the hire of two partners from Reed Smith. The move meant HFW had 19 partners and more than 50 lawyers - including 28 Arabic speakers - in four offices across the Middle East, making it one of the largest practices of any international law firm in the region. HFW also has an office in Riyadh, and is one of only two international law firms with a base in Kuwait City.

In August 2019, the firm launched in Monaco with the hire of a market-leading team from Ince.

In 2022, HFW launched in the British Virgin Islands through the acquisition of the BVI office of offshore law firm Lennox Paton. The firm later opened a representative office in Shenzhen/Qianhai and, in 2025, opened in Brisbane, its fourth office in Australia.

== Core sectors and services ==
HFW is unusual for an international law firm in that it is focused on sectors, rather than practice areas. The firm's entire business, from legal services to CSR and pro bono, is built around six core sectors globally:

Sectors

- Aerospace
- Commodities
- Construction
- Energy and Resources
- Insurance and Reinsurance
- Shipping

The firm also offers a broad range of legal services:

Services

- Dispute Resolution
- Corporate
- Finance
- EU, Competition and Regulatory
- Fraud and Insolvency
- International Trade Regulation
- Commercial
- Cyber Security
- Data Protection
- Digital Trade
- Employment
- Financial Institutions
- Financial Services Regulation
- Government Services
- Logistics
- Mining
- Oil and Gas
- Ports and Terminals
- Projects

The firm has been identified as one of the most active law firms in the English Commercial Court. According to data published by The Lawyer Litigation Tracker, HFW handled more commercial litigation cases in the Commercial Court than any other law firm between 2015 and 2023.

== Awards and recognition ==
HFW is ranked Band 1 for Shipping in Chambers UK and Tier 1 for Shipping in The Legal 500. In the Chambers High Net Worth Guide 2025, HFW was also ranked Band 1 globally for Yachts & Superyachts.

== Offices ==
The firm has 22 offices across Europe, the Middle East, the Americas, and Asia Pacific: Abu Dhabi, Brisbane, British Virgin Islands, Brussels, Dubai, Geneva, Hong Kong, Houston, Kuwait, London, Melbourne, Monaco, Paris, Perth, Piraeus, Rio de Janeiro, Riyadh, Sao Paulo, Shanghai, Shenzhen, Singapore, Sydney.
