= TMI Associates =

- Headquarters: Minato, Tokyo, Japan
- No. of offices: 16
- No. of attorneys: 769 (2026)
- No. of employees: 1,317 (2026)
- Major practice areas: General practice
- Date founded: 1 October 1990
- Company type: Partnership under Japanese law
- Website: www.tmi.gr.jp

TMI Associates (TMI総合法律事務所, TMI Sōgō Hōritsu Jimusho) is one of the five largest law firms in Japan.

The firm was founded in 1990 by ten intellectual property specialists who left the law firm of Nishimura & Partners. It grew quickly in ensuing years, with 33 attorneys as of 1998 and more than 700 domestic and foreign attorneys and patent attorneys as of 2026.

TMI is headquartered in the Roppongi Hills Mori Tower in Minato, Tokyo, Japan. Its other offices in Japan include Kobe, Nagoya, Osaka, Kyoto and Fukuoka and the firm also has offices in Bangkok, Beijing, Hanoi, Ho Chi Minh City, London, Phnom Penh, Shanghai, Silicon Valley, Singapore and Yangon. It opened its first domestic branch office in Nagoya in 2012. It was the first Japanese law firm to open an office in Myanmar. TMI opened an Osaka office in 2018 by acquiring the four-lawyer practice of Isamu Omizu, a former vice chairman of the Osaka Bar Association.

The firm has joint ventures with the American law firm of Morgan, Lewis & Bockius, the British law firm of Simmons & Simmons and the German law firm of ARQIS Rechtsanwälte. The Simmons & Simmons venture, begun in 2001, was the first registered joint venture between a major Japanese law firm and an international law firm under the attorney at foreign law system. TMI's Singapore office is also shared with Simmons & Simmons. In March 2025, the firm announced a strategic alliance with Johnson Winter Slattery, an independent Australian commercial law firm.

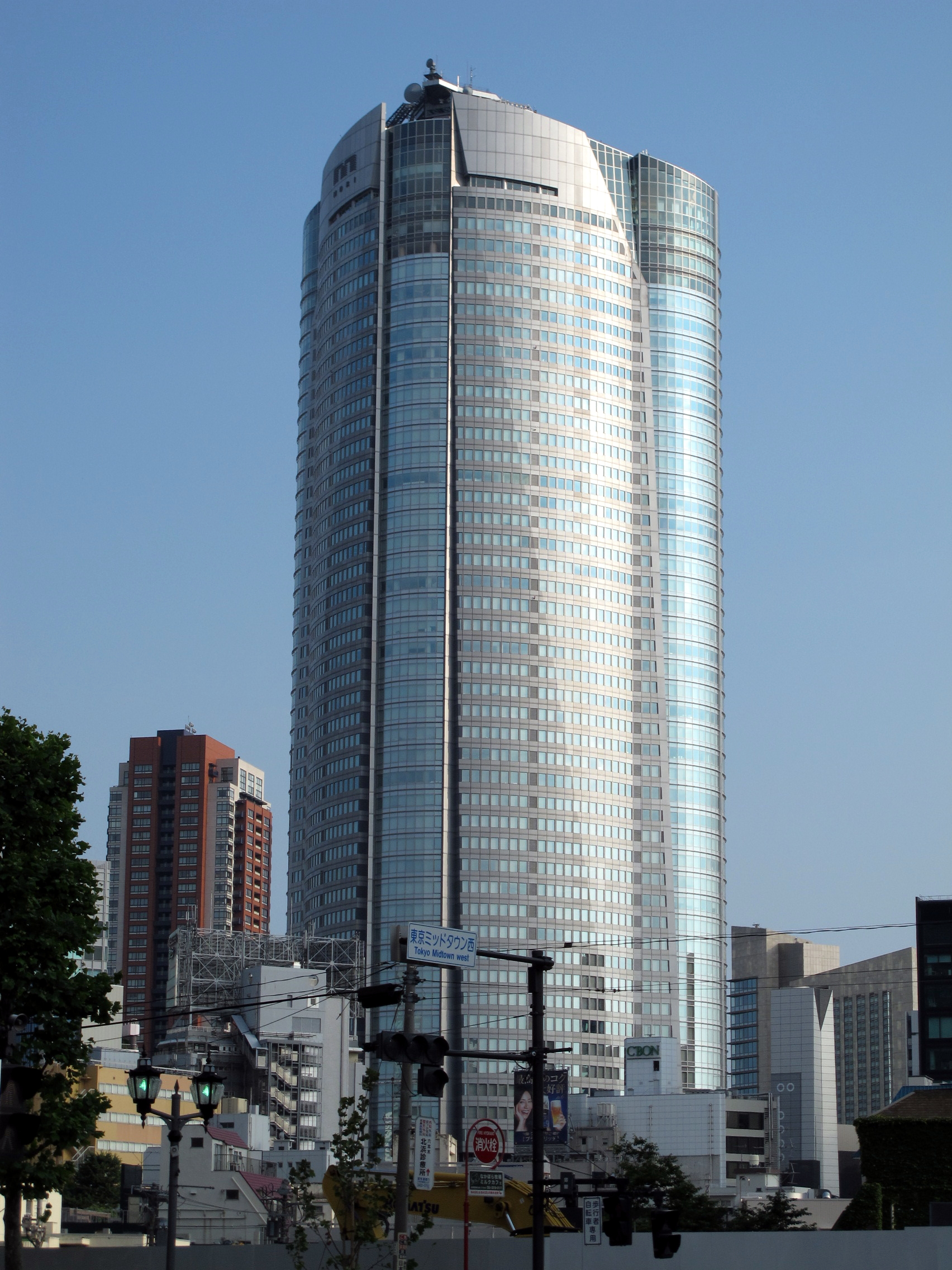
Roppongi Hills Mori Tower, location of TMI's main office in Tokyo

The firm is particularly known for its intellectual property practice, being ranked one of the top 3 trademark firms in Japan by World Trademark Review and winning the "Best Japanese IP Firm 2013" award at the International Legal Alliance Summit & Awards. In 2010, the firm hired a former head of the Intellectual Property High Court as an advisor.

Chambers & Partners ranks TMI in the areas of Banking & Finance, Competition/Antitrust, Corporate/M&A, Dispute Resolution, Employment, Intellectual Property, International Trade, Life Science, Projects & Energy and Real Estate.

== Notable people ==
- Toshiharu Furukawa, member of the House of Councillors
- Isao Imai, former Japanese Supreme Court justice
- Tokuji Izumi, former Japanese Supreme Court justice
- Chiharu Saiguchi, former Japanese Supreme Court justice
