= Eversheds Sutherland =

Multinational law firm

Eversheds Sutherland LLP
- Headquarters: London, United Kingdom & Atlanta, Georgia
- No. of offices: 72
- No. of lawyers: 2,511 (2025)
- No. of employees: More than 4,000
- Major practice areas: General practice, commercial practice
- Date founded: 1988 (Eversheds LLP); 1924 (Sutherland Asbill & Brennan LLP); 2017 (Eversheds Sutherland LLP)
- Company type: Limited liability partnership
- Website: eversheds-sutherland.com

Eversheds Sutherland is a global multinational law practice created by a combination of law firms Eversheds LLP and Sutherland Asbill & Brennan LLP, in February 2017, and is one of the 50 largest law practices in the world.

== History ==
Between 2008 and 2010, Eversheds had four rounds of redundancies and cut a total of around 730 jobs, the largest staff reductions of any UK-based law firm in that period.

In May 2011, Eversheds merged with the law consortium KSLG, which comprised Dhabaan & Partners in Saudi Arabia; Khasawneh & Associates in the UAE; and Sanad Law Group in Jordan and Iraq.

In 2013, Eversheds split from its South African arm, which rebranded to its former name, Routledge Modise.

In January 2026, the company established a US Innovation Department focused on AI, technology, data and process improvements. The department, led by Senior Director Katrina Dittmer, consolidated functions including data and analytics, research and knowledge services, legal technology, client-facing technologies, and change management and adoption.

In July 2026, Eversheds Sutherland took possession of its new Birmingham office at Three Chamberlain Square, part of the Paradise redevelopment in Birmingham city centre. The firm said its approximately 500-person Birmingham team would move into two floors of the building in summer 2027.
