= Bird & Bird =

International law firm headquartered in 1846

- Headquarters: 12 New Fetter Lane; London
- No. of offices: 34
- No. of attorneys: 1,700+
- No. of employees: 3,000+
- Major practice areas: 18
- Key people: Christian Bartsch
- Date founded: 1846
- Founder: William Frederick Wratislaw Bird and James Moore
- Company type: LLP
- Website: twobirds.com

Bird & Bird is an international law firm founded in London in 1846, where the firm maintains its global headquarters.

The firm operates under the domain twobirds.com, which is used for its website and email communications.

== Global offices ==
Bird & Bird has more than 1,600 lawyers and legal practitioners across 34 offices worldwide.

The firm's offices include Abu Dhabi, Amsterdam, Beijing, Bratislava, Brussels, Budapest, Casablanca, Copenhagen, Dubai, Dublin, Düsseldorf, Frankfurt, The Hague, Hamburg, Helsinki, Hong Kong, Lisbon, London, Lyon, Madrid, Milan, Munich, Paris, Prague, Riyadh, Rome, San Francisco, Shanghai, Shenzhen, Singapore, Stockholm, Sydney, Tokyo and Warsaw.

Bird & Bird covers a wide range of practice areas, including banking and finance, commercial, competition and EU law, corporate, dispute resolution, intellectual property, privacy and data protection, and real estate. The firm provides advisory, transactional and contentious services across sectors such as automotive, aviation & defence, energy & utilities, financial services, life sciences & healthcare, retail & consumer, media, entertainment & sport, and technology & communications.

Bird & Bird has been ranked by legal directories including Legal 500 and Chambers and Partners. In the Legal 500 2026 rankings, the firm received Tier 1 rankings in areas including artificial intelligence, intellectual property (patents), IT and telecommunications, and data protection, privacy and cybersecurity.

In its Europe 2026 edition, Chambers and Partners ranked the firm in 82 departments and recognised 121 individuals, including Europe-wide Band 1 rankings in data protection, intellectual property, TMT: information technology, and TMT: telecommunications.

== History ==
=== Founding and establishment ===
Bird & Bird's history stretches back to the 1830s and the firm was formally established in the UK in 1846.

=== 2000s ===
In 2000, the firm opened offices in France and Sweden. One year later it opened in The Netherlands and the following year it opened its first office in Germany.

In 2003, the expansion continued, with a new office in Italy and a second office in Germany.

In 2004, the number of partners at the firm reached 100 for the first time, and the expansion continued unabated with a new office in Beijing. The following year saw new offices in Madrid, Rome and Frankfurt.

2006 saw a further opening of new office in Lyon in France.

2008 saw the firm open a Finnish office in Helsinki through a merger with a leading Finnish firm Fennica, as well as four other offices in the Czech Republic, Hungary, Poland and Slovakia and a third office in China with the opening of an office in Shanghai. On top of this, expansion in London continued through a merger with Lane & Partners.

=== 2010s ===
Bird & Bird continued to expand its international reach and in May 2013, merged with Danish outfit BvHD, completing its coverage of the Nordic region. The same year, the firm signed an international cooperation agreement with BCCC Avocats, located in Switzerland.

In November 2014, Bird & Bird merged with leading Australian new economy specialist law firm, Truman Hoyle, to create their first office in Australia. The merger brought their presence in the Asia Pacific region to 5 offices, with another 5 formal co-operation agreements in place in Malaysia, China, Indonesia and Korea.

In 2018, the firm welcomed a new hub office in Amsterdam, and a representative office in downtown San Francisco, their first office in the USA.
