= Pinsent Masons =

International law firm

- Headquarters: Crown Place; London, EC2; United Kingdom
- No. of employees: 3500
- Revenue: £680 million (2024/25)
- Date founded: 1769
- Company type: Limited liability partnership
- Website: www.pinsentmasons.com

Pinsent Masons LLP is an international law firm headquartered in London. The firm is a prominent legal brand and a large global law firm. It has 500 employees in London and around 1,900 legal staff globally.

== History ==
Pinsent Masons has 29 offices across Africa, Asia Pacific, Europe and the Middle East. It is the product of a series of mergers between firms including Pinsent & Co, Masons, Simpson Curtis, Biddle & Co, L'Estrange & Brett and McGrigors. Its oldest mergee firms were established in 1769.

The firm focusses on providing legal services in the sectors of financial services, technology, science, real estate, and energy and infrastructure. Its clients include large corporations and firms, for example Balfour Beatty and E.ON.

The firm's board is led by a senior partner, who since 2026 has been John Maciver, a Scots lawyer.

Vario is its freelance contract lawyer service. In 2015 it acquired a majority stake in Cerico, an online compliance business.

The firm has used generative AI in its work. In 2026 it referred itself to the Solicitors Regulation Authority after a public judicial admonition for AI misuse.
