= Giardino Botanico Ponziano =

Private botanical garden in Italy

Coordinates: 40°54′N 12°58′E

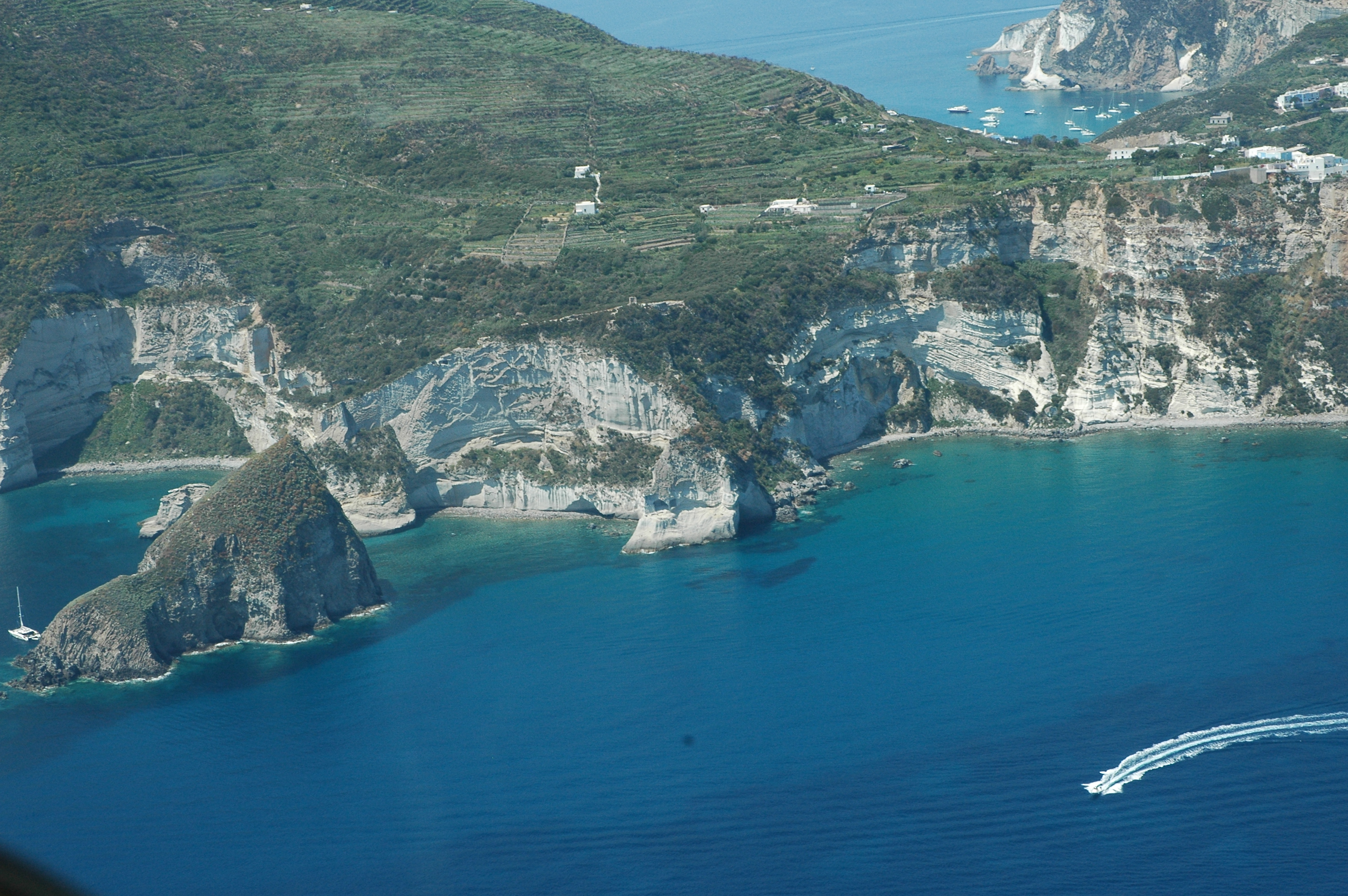

The Giardino Botanico Ponziano is a private botanical garden located on Villa Madonna collina Belvedere, Ponza in the Pontine Islands, Province of Latina, Lazio, Italy.

The garden was established in the 1980s by Dr. Biagio Vitiello, and contains a variety of woody plants typical of the Pontine Islands and now threatened. It also contains a collection of wild orchids, including Neottia nidus-ovis, Ophrys tenthredinifera, Orchis morio, Orchis papilionacea, Serapias lingua, and Spiranthes spiralis.

Other species include Anthyllis barba-jovis, Arbutus unedo, Artemisia arboris, Asparagus acutifolius, Cistus monspeliensis, Cistus salvifolius, Daphne sericea, Erica arborea, Erica multiflora, Euphorbia arboris, Juniperus phoenicea, Laurus nobilis, Lonicera implexa, Medicago arborea, Myrtus communis, Pistacia lentiscus, Rhamnus alaternus, Ricinus communis, Scilla maritima, Smilax aspera, Spartium junceum, Sternbergia lutea, Thymelaea hirsuta, and Viburnum tinus. This privately owned botanical garden of rare endangered flowering plants is almost directly above the Grotta di Ulisse O Del Sangue, which means Cave of Ulysses of the Blood.

== See also ==
- List of botanical gardens in Italy
