= Internal exile in Greece =

State-sponsored exile for political dissidents within Greece

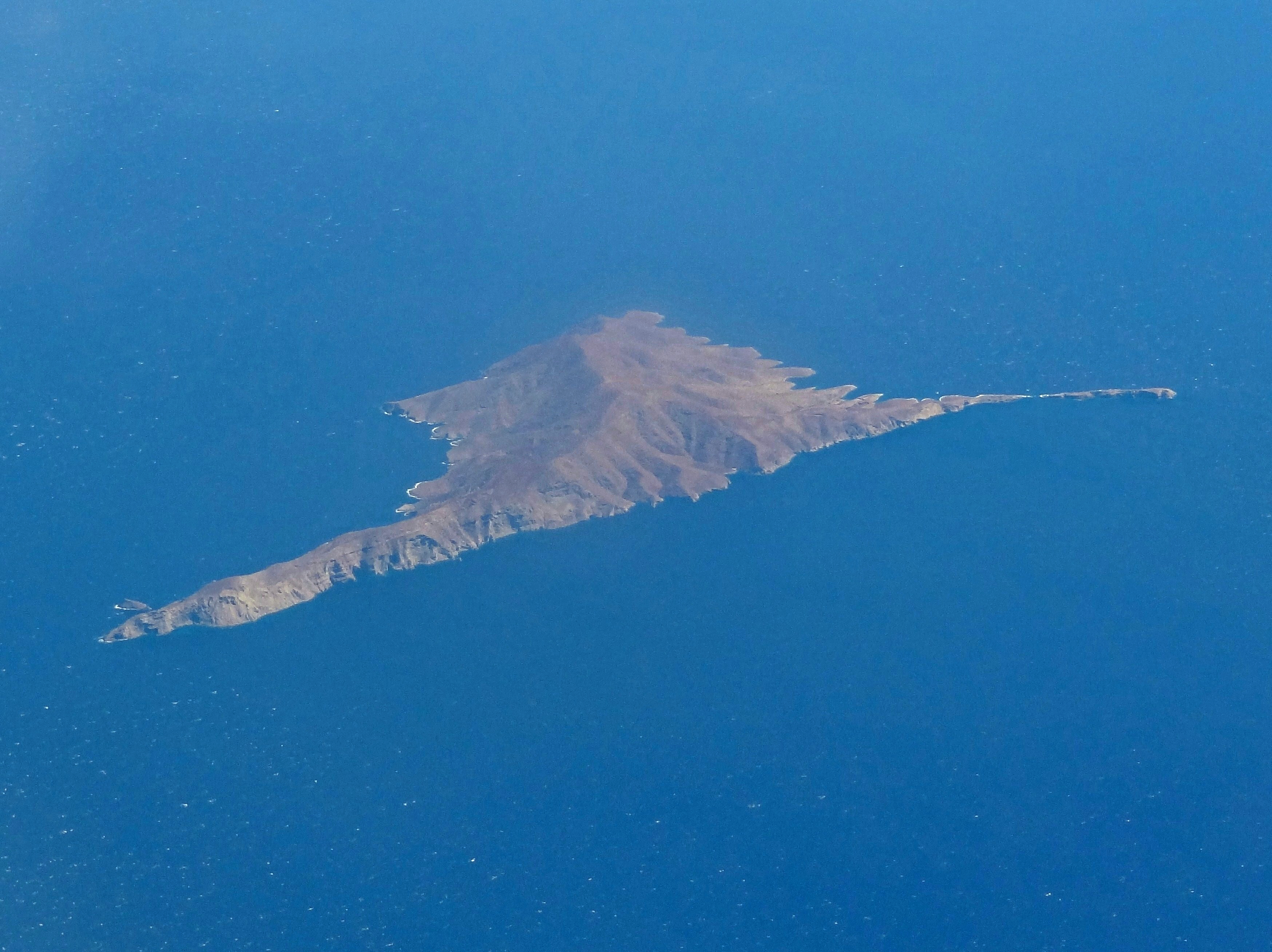
20,000 political prisoners were banished to Gyaros during and after the Greek Civil War.

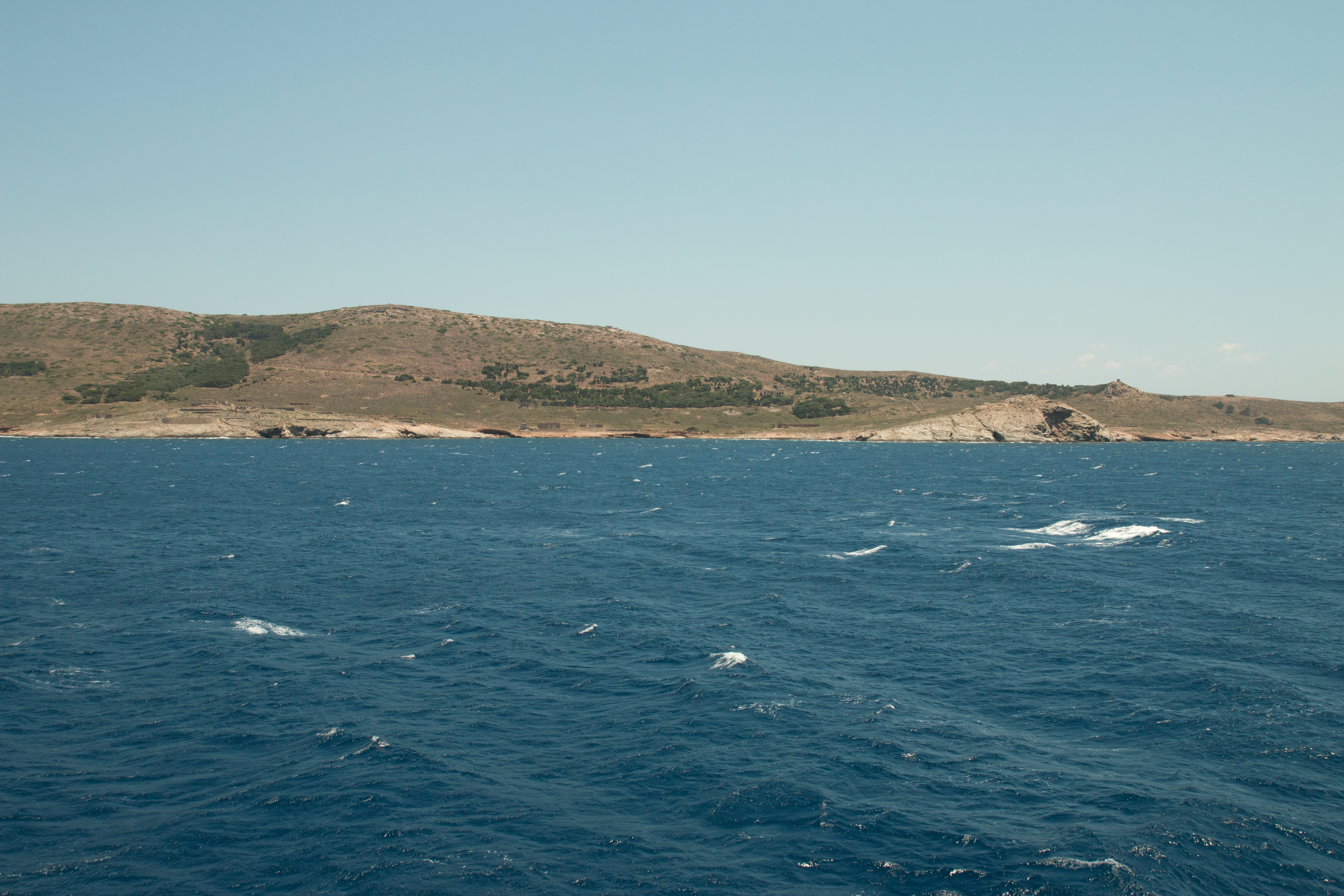
Makronisos from a ferry

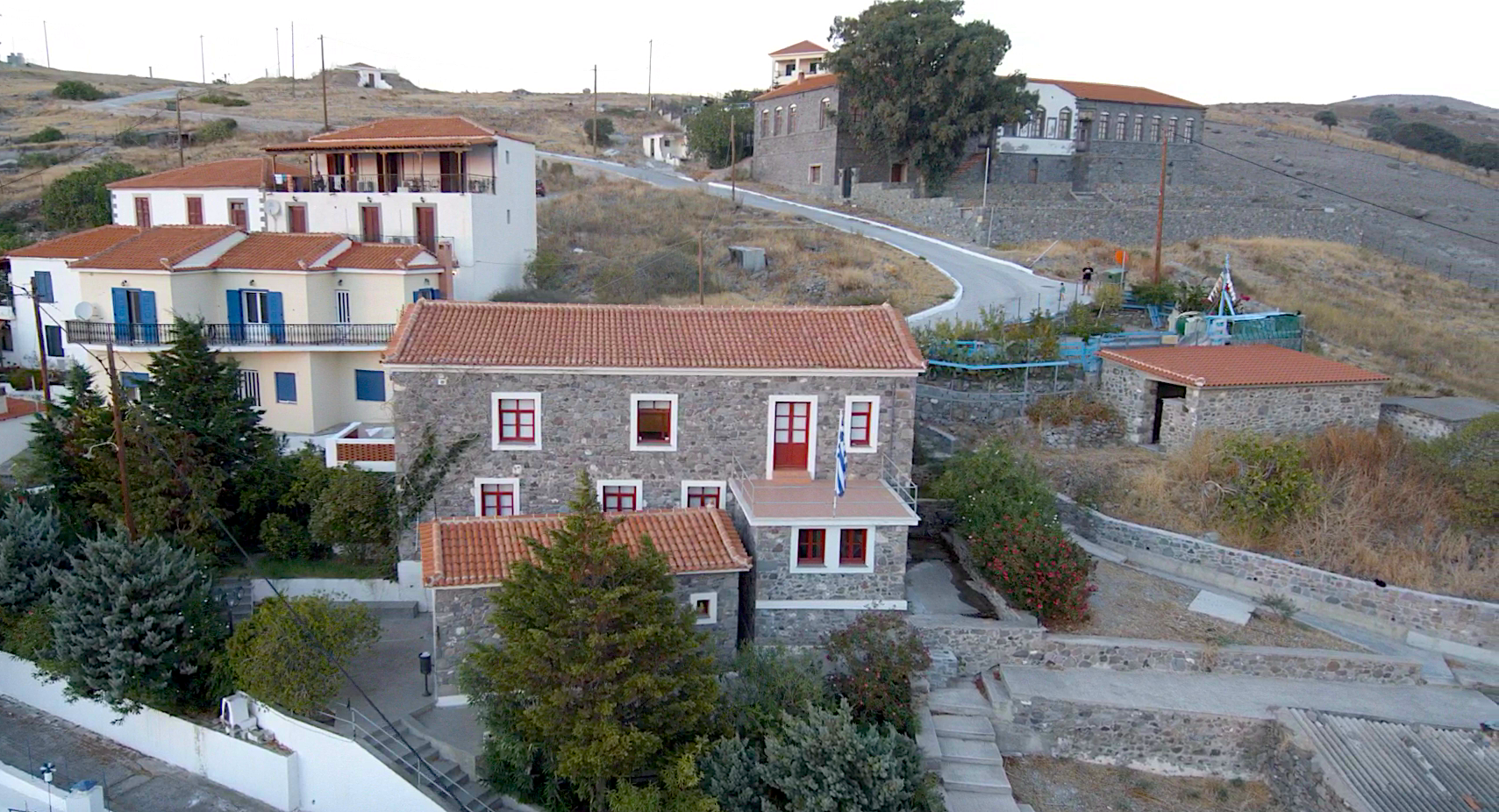
Democracy Museum in Agios Efstratios

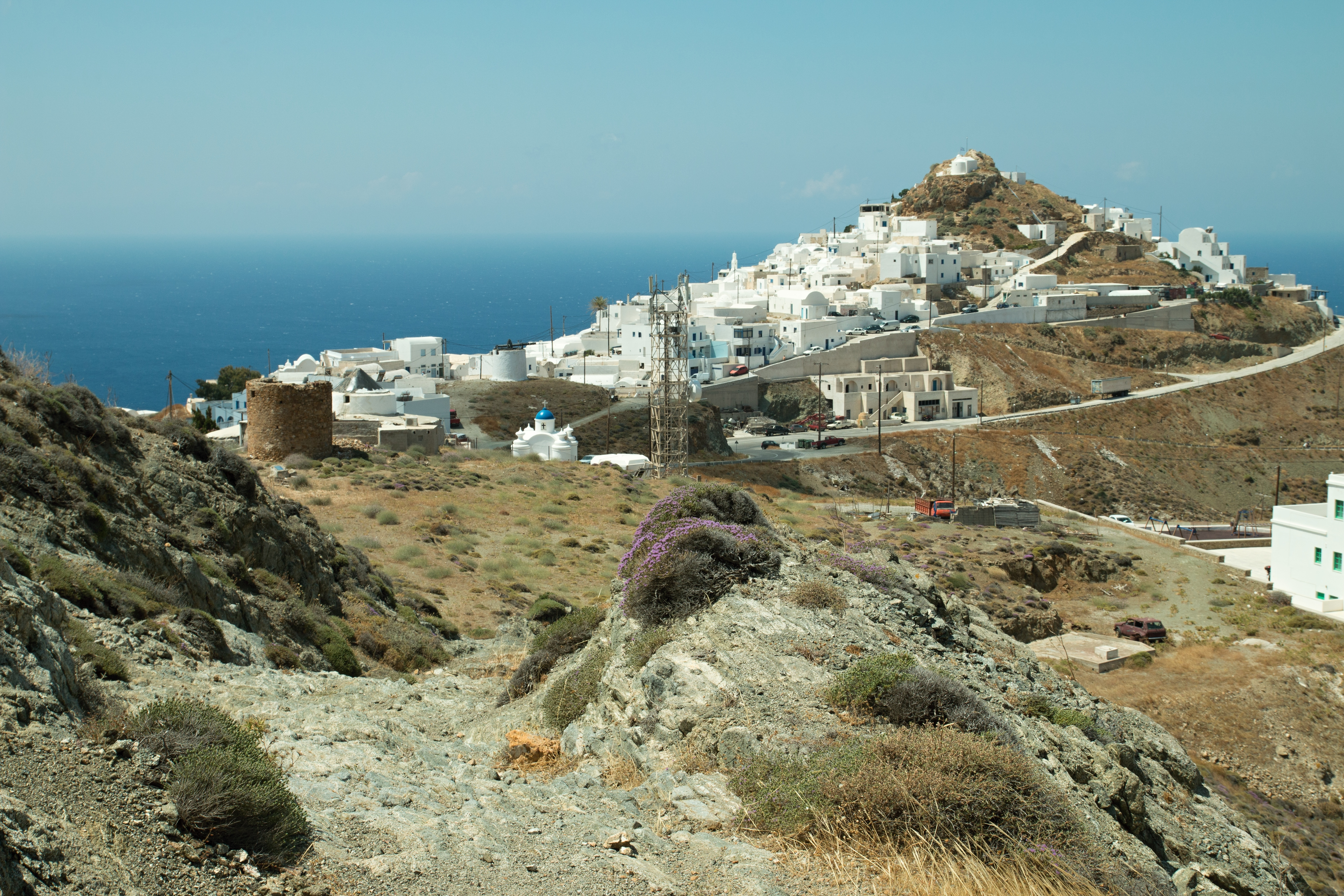
Political detainees were deported to Anafi since the 1910s

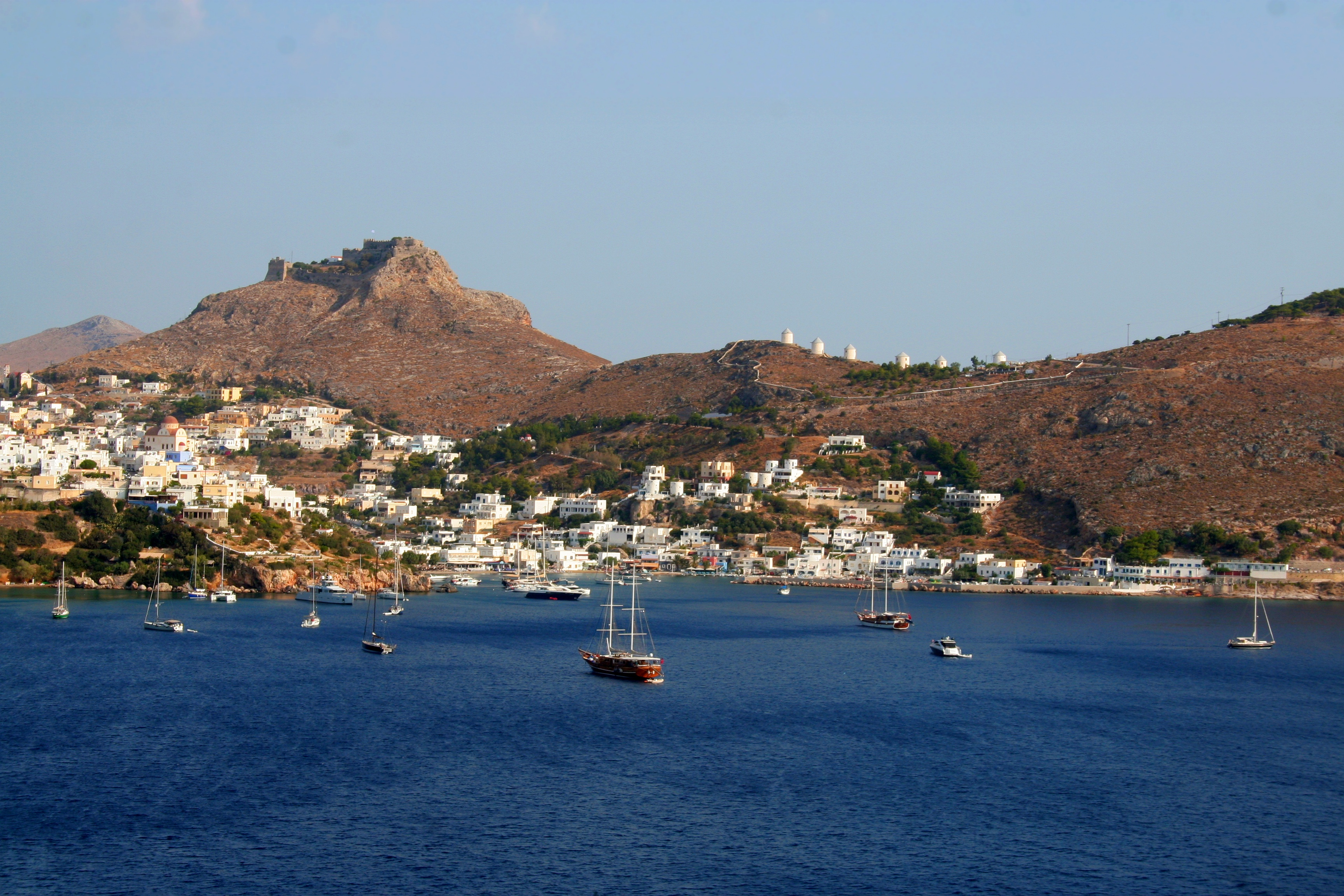
Thousands of people were banished to Leros by the Greek junta

Internal exile was used to punish political dissidents by various Greek governments, including the Pangalos Regime (1925–1926) and the Metaxas 4th of August Regime (1936–1941), the government during the Greek Civil War (1946–1949), and the Greek junta (1967–1974). Exiles were typically sent to smaller, often uninhabited Greek islands. Many of these island sites operated only as prison islands, among the most notorious including Makronisos, Gyaros, and Agios Efstratios, where barracks and facilities for housing prisoners served as concentration camps. Over 100 locations across Greece were used for political exile at various times in the 20th century.

== Background ==
Internal exile has a long history of use by rulers of Greece, and in the early twentieth century was used for opponents of Venizelism, such as monarchists, conservatives or communists. During the National Schism and after Venizelos came to power in mid-1917, many political opponents (such as the former PM Spyridon Lambros) were internally exiled.

Exile was preferred to mainland imprisonment because the mainland prisons were overcrowded, and exile made it easier to monitor the prisoners' correspondence and limit their political influence. The 1929 Idionymon law criminalized subversive ideas as well as actions, leading to an increase in the number of prisoners. The island of Ai Stratis was used from 1929 until 1974. Until 1943, there were no formal internment camps on the island, and the exiles rented houses from the residents.

== Pangalos regime ==
In June 1925, Theodoros Pangalos seized power via a bloodless coup d'état. Under his rule, several isolated islands functioned as places of exile for left-wing activists and communists.

== Metaxas regime ==
The 4th of August Regime (1936–1941) established prison camps for dissidents on barren islands. Under Ioannis Metaxas, about 1,000 were sentenced to internal exile, including members of the Communist Party of Greece, socialists, and trade union organizers. Most of those imprisoned were working-class, but others were intellectuals. Prisoners sentenced to internal exile were taken to barren islands where they had to organize their own food and shelter.

== Greek Civil War ==
During and after the Greek Civil War (1946–1949), thousands of left-wing combatants and suspected sympathizers were arrested and imprisoned. After the Civil War, political prisoners continued to be held throughout the 1950s and 1960s. The island of Makronisos was used from 1947 to 1955 and became something of a "model camp" for the Greek junta. In Ai Stratis, where 5,500 people including women and children were sent between 1946 and 1947, camps were established for the first time. Twenty thousand were sent to a concentration camp on the uninhabited island of Gyaros, dubbed "Dachau of the Mediterranean". The prisoners had to work building the prison, but as soon as it was completed, the island was shut down in 1952 due to condemnation from the United Nations of the poor conditions there. Ai Stratis, designated for "unrepentant" prisoners, remained open until 1963, although the number of prisoners gradually decreased.

== Greek junta ==
Following the coup of 21 April 1967, the junta expanded the arrest of political dissidents and the use of prison islands. Around 6,000 people were sent to Gyaros, now called the "Greek Gulag". The junta denied that political prisoners were held there, but the lie was exposed when German journalists for Stern rented a plane and photographed the island from the air, revealing the truth. Gyaros was shut down in November 1968 following international protest of its poor conditions and criticism from the Red Cross. Ai Stratis, reopened by the junta and used for individual cases, was devastated by a 1968 earthquake that destroyed much of the prison camp.

In October 1974 just before the 1974 Greek legislative election, five leaders of the junta including Georgios Papadopoulos were temporarily exiled to Kea.

== Aftermath ==
The practice of internal exile was abolished in 1974, during the Metapolitefsi. The island of Makronisos has been protected since 1989. Greece is trying to have the island recognized by UNESCO as a World Heritage Site, to "preserv[e] the island of exile and its remaining ruins as symbols of the struggle against fascism, and of the human spirits and democracy’s triumph against oppression and dehumanization".
