= Organizational-dynamic game =

Organizational-dynamic games are Serious games that teach and reflect the dynamics of organizations at the following 3 levels:

- individual behavior (specific attitudes towards collaboration or knowledge sharing, competencies, character traits, motivation, change readiness, etc.)
- group and network dynamics (power and influence pattern, sub-group behavior, team dynamics as in Group-dynamic games, etc.)
- cultural dynamics (specific values, dominant mental and behavioral models, etc.)

Organizational-dynamic games are usually designed for the specific purpose of furthering personal development and character building, particularly in addressing complex organizational situations, such as managing change and innovation diffusion in a company, helping people in the organization to introduce productive collaboration patterns, managing difficult meeting situations, etc.

They have a proven history in helping managers and decision makers in better understanding organizational dynamics, the diagnosis of organizational contexts, and the impact of organizational interventions (corresponding to the actions you can undertake in such a simulation to achieve a result (e.g. a change in attitude or behavior).

See the example of the EIS simulation .

== Examples ==
- Awkward Moment at Work: serious game with a design informed by psychological theory and research, aimed at reducing gender bias and broadening participation in STEM.
- Houthoff Buruma The Game: serious game for recruitment purposes, developed by Dutch law firm Houthoff Buruma.
- Novicraft HRD game (Microsoft Windows): NoviCraft is a serious game for supporting business customers in social excellence, in learning to construct shared understanding together with different people in changing contexts.
- CALM: Change Adaptation Learning Model: serious game for testing, validating, and refining plans to enable transformational organizational change. Developed by DecisionPath, Inc. see: [R.M. Adler and D. Koehn, “CALM: complex adaptive system (CAS)-Based Decision Support for Enabling Organizational Change”, Intl Conference on Complex Systems (ICCS 2007), Oct 28- Nov 1, 2007].
