= Prison island =

Island which contains a correctional facility

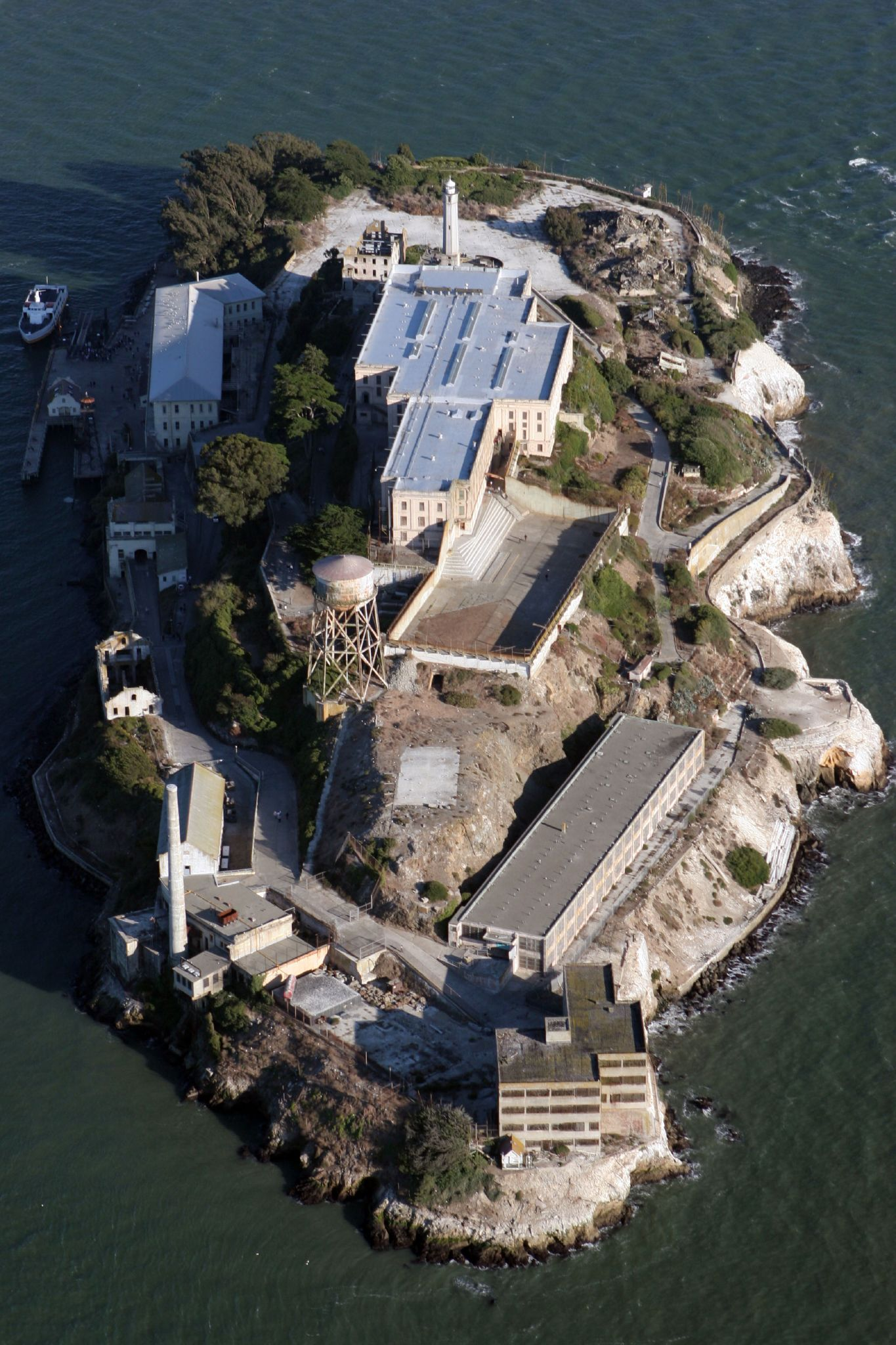
Aerial view of Alcatraz, a former island prison near San Francisco, California

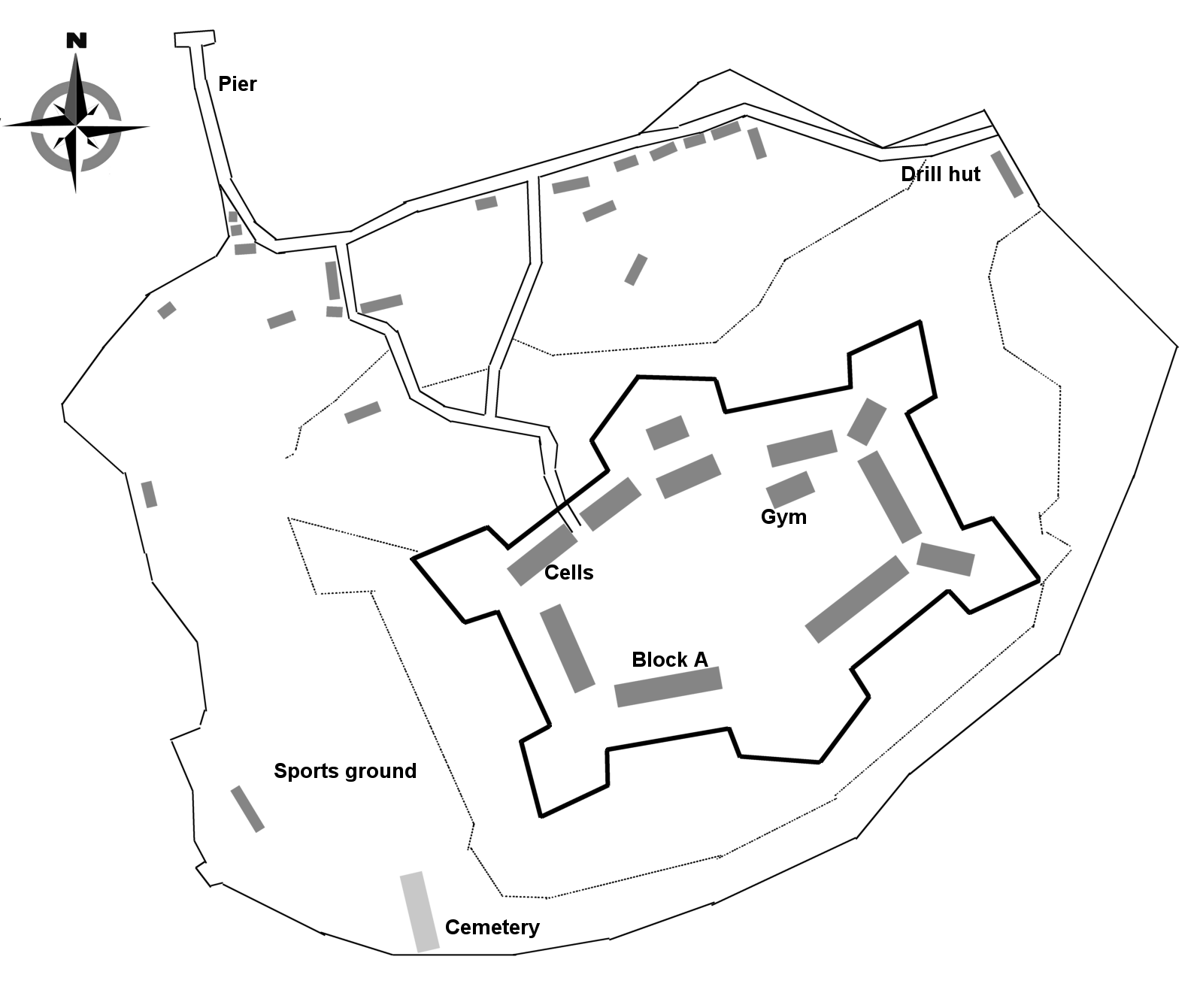
Plan of Spike Island, Ireland

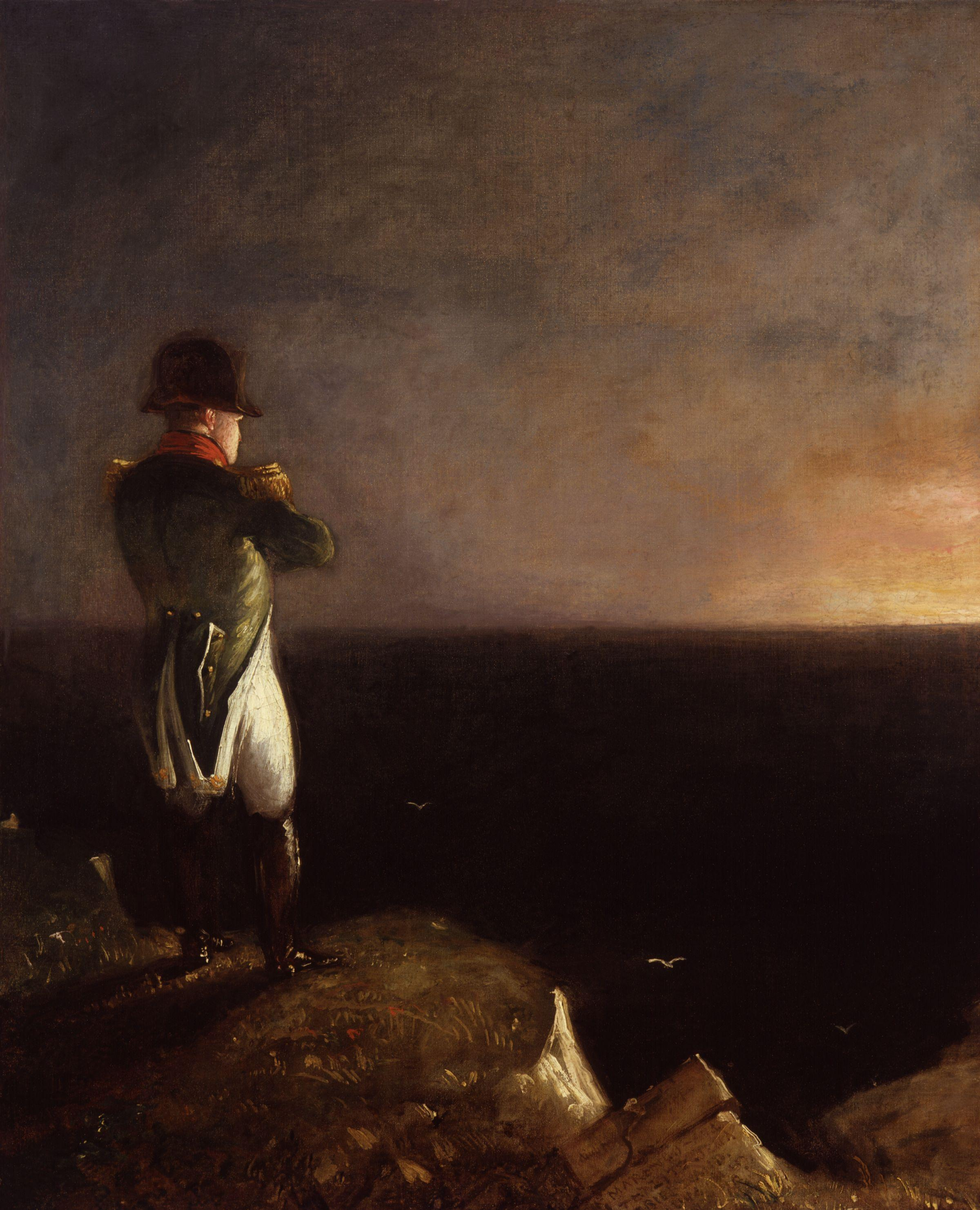
Painting of Napoleon in exile on Saint Helena

A prison island is an island housing a prison. Islands have often been used as sites of prisons throughout history due to their natural isolation preventing escape.

== Prison islands by country ==
=== Oceania ===
- Christmas Island, location of Christmas Island Detention Centre which houses people who have entered Australia as illegal immigrants. Processing centre to determine individuals genuinely seeking asylum and return those who are not.
- Cockatoo Island, use as prison began in 1839
- Great Palm Island, Aboriginal prison (Palm Island Aboriginal Settlement)
- Los Negros Island (Papua New Guinea), site of Manus Regional Processing Centre from 2001 to 2017
- Norfolk Island, penal colony from 1788 to 1814
- Pinchgut Island, prison in the 1790s
- Rottnest Island, Aboriginal prison from 1838 to 1931
- St Helena Island, prison from 1867 to 1933
- Sarah Island and neighboring Grummet Island

=== Bahrain ===
- Jidda Island, prison from 1930 until the 1970s

=== Bulgaria ===
- St. Anastasia Island, used as a prison island for political prisoners between 1925 and 1940

=== Canada ===
- Georges Island, prison during the Seven Years' War and American Revolution
- Melville Island, prison from 1793 to 1815 and 1856 to the 1930s

=== Channel Islands ===
- Alderney, 1940–1945, four camps built during the German occupation of the Channel Islands: two camps of "volunteer" workers (Lager Borkum, Lager Norderney) and two subcamps of Neuengamme concentration camp (Lager Helgoland, Lager Sylt). European forced labourers were made to build fortifications on the island

=== China ===
- Dongguan Prison occupies most of Xinzhou, an island in the East River

=== Colombia ===
- Gorgona Island, prison from 1959 to 1984

=== Costa Rica ===
- San Lucas Island, prison from 1873 to 1991

=== Croatia ===
- Goli Otok, location of the prison and torture camp for political dissidents in SFR Yugoslavia from 1949 to 1988

=== Eritrea ===
- Nakura, colonial Italian Nocra prison camp

=== Fiji ===
- Nukulau, prison from 2000 to 2006

=== France ===
- Île Royale, 1852–1952, part of the Devil's Island penal colony
- Devil's Island (Kourou), 1852–1952, part of the Devil's Island penal colony
- Saint-Joseph Island, 1852–1952, part of the Devil's Island penal colony
- Île Sainte-Marguerite, 1600s–1900s
- Île d'Yeu, 1945–1951, used to imprison Philippe Pétain, collaborationist leader of Vichy France.
- Château d'If, 17th century–1890, famous as a setting for The Count of Monte Cristo

=== Greece ===
- Agios Efstratios,
- Gyaros, prison and torture camp after the Greek Civil War
- Makronisos, political prison from 1920s to 1970s

=== Hong Kong ===
- Hei Ling Chau
  - Hei Ling Chau Addiction Treatment Centre, 1975–present
  - Hei Ling Chau Correctional Institution, 1994–present
  - Lai Sun Correctional Institution, 1984–present
  - Nei Kwu Correctional Institution, 2002–present
- Tai A Chau
  - Tai A Chau Detention Centre, 1991–96

=== India ===
- Ross Island, prison from 1858 to 1945
- Viper Island, former British prison

=== Indonesia ===
- Buru, prison in 1960s–1970s
- Nusa Kambangan, notorious prison island off the southern coast of Java, containing a number of prisons

=== Ireland ===
- Dalkey Island, used in the 10th century as a holding area for slaves prior to sale by the Vikings of Dublin
- Spike Island, County Cork, a prison from as early as the 17th century (current structure is an 18th-century bastion fort named Fort Mitchel). It closed in 2004 and is now a museum.

=== Isle of Man ===
- Hutchinson Internment Camp, 1940–1945, in the southeast of the Isle of Man. Held Austrian and German internees until 1944, when it became a POW camp

=== Italy ===
- Asinara, prison from World War I until 1997
- Elba, held Napoleon from 1814 to 1815
- Gorgona, site of Gorgona Agricultural Penal Colony since 1869
- Pianosa, prison from 1856 to 1998
- Ponza, prison during Fascist era
- Santo Stefano Island, prison from 1797 to 1965; 'Italy’s Alcatraz'
- Ustica, prison from Fascist era until the 1950s

=== Japan ===
- Hachijō-jima, prison until the Meiji Restoration
- Kami-shima, prison during the Edo period

=== Madagascar ===
- Nosy Lava

=== Malaysia ===
- Jerejak Island, location of the Jerejak Rehabilitation Centre from 1969 to 1993; called the 'Alcatraz of Malaysia'

=== Maldives ===
- Dhoonidhoo

=== Mexico ===
- Islas Marías, site of Islas Marías Federal Prison from 1905 to 2019

=== Montenegro ===
- Grmožur, a fortified islet in Lake Skadar which served as a prison
- Mamula, location of the Fascist Italian concentration camp, from 1942 to 1945

=== Namibia ===
- Shark Island concentration camp, 1905–1907, used during the Herero and Nama genocide

=== New Zealand ===
- Motuihe Island, World War I internment camp famous for holding Felix von Luckner

=== Norway ===
- Bastøy Island, liberal prison begun in 1982
- Munkholmen, prison in the 1600s

=== Panama ===
- Coiba, prison from 1919 to 2004

=== Peru ===
- El Frontón, prison from 1917 to 1980s
- San Lorenzo Island, temporary prison in the 1990s

=== Portugal ===
- Santiago, Cape Verde, site of Tarrafal concentration camp from 1936 to 1974

=== Russia ===
- Mudyug Island, British/French prison camp near Arkhangelsk
- Nazino Island, site of mass deportation and murder in 1933
- Ognenny Ostrov, location of Vologodskiy Pyatak prison since 1917
- Solovetsky Islands, site of Solovki prison camp Gulag
- Trofimovsk Island, deportation site of Lithuanians and Finns in the Lena River delta

=== Saint Helena ===
- Saint Helena, famously held Napoleon; held prisoners during the Second Anglo-Boer War

=== Seychelles ===
- Coëtivy Island
- Marie Louise Island, from 2012 to 2017

=== Singapore ===
- Pulau Senang, prison from 1960 to 1964

=== South Africa ===
- Robben Island, location of Robben Island Prison from 1961 to 1996. The Island was used to incarcerate political prisoners as early as the 17th Century, and later during the Xhosa Wars

=== South Korea ===
- Geojedo, active during the Korean War; Geoje POW camp

=== Syria ===
- Arwad, prison under French colonial rule

=== Taiwan ===
- Green Island, prison during Taiwan's period of martial law

=== Tanzania ===
- Changuu, known as 'Prison Island'; held rebellious slaves in 1860s

=== Timor Leste ===
- Atauro, used as prison by Portugal and Indonesia

=== Trinidad and Tobago ===
- Carrera Island, prison since the late 19th century

=== Tonga ===
- ʻAtā, prison since 2001

=== Thailand ===
- Ko Tao Between 1943 and 1944, Koh Tao was used as a political prison.

=== Turkey ===
- Hapishane Adası, former Roman prison
- İmralı island, location of a prison since 1935

=== United Kingdom ===
- Bass Rock, castle used as a prison from 15th century to 18th century
- Drake's Island, prison in the 17th century

=== United States ===
- Alcatraz Island, location of Alcatraz Federal Penitentiary from 1934 until 1963
- Belle Isle, prison camp (Confederate) during the American Civil War
- Castle Island, prison in the 18th century
- Deer Island, location of Deer Island Prison, closed in 1991
- Diego Garcia, overseas territory of the United Kingdom believed to be a CIA black site circa 2005
- Dry Tortugas/Garden Key, prison on Fort Jefferson during and after the American Civil War
- Governors Island
- Hart Island, prison from 1865 to 1967
- Johnson's Island, prison camp (Union) during the American Civil War
- Kahoʻolawe, Hawaiian penal colony from 1830 to 1853
- McNeil Island, location of McNeil Island Corrections Center from 1875 to 2011
- Rikers Island, location of New York City's main jail complex
- Rock Island, prison camp (Union) during the American Civil War
- Roosevelt Island (formerly Blackwell's Island), prison in the 19th century
- Terminal Island, a low security federal prison

=== Vietnam ===
- Côn Sơn Island, French colonial and South Vietnamese prison

== Prison islands in fiction ==
- The Count of Monte Cristo (1846), Château d'If
- Red Pawn (1932)
- The Prisoner of Shark Island (1936), Dry Tortugas
- I Was a Prisoner on Devil's Island (1941), Devil's Island
- Isle of Missing Men (1942), Caruba
- Wonder Woman (1942)
- 20,000 Leagues Under the Sea (1954), Rura Penthe
- Vanji Kottai Valipan (1958)
- The Adventures of Batman (1968), Satan Island
- Papillon (1969), Devil's Island
- Onna-rō Hizu (1970)
- This Earth of Mankind (1980), Buru
- Escape from New York (1981), Manhattan
- Bring 'Em Back Alive (1982), Kampoon
- Touch the Devil (1982), Belle Isle
- Tales of the Gold Monkey (1982)
- The Fall Guy (1983), Devil's Island
- Raiders of the Living Dead (1986)
- The Uplift War (1987)
- Superman vol. 2 (1987), Stryker's Island
- Island of Fire (1990)
- Ravage 2099 (1992), Hellrock, New York
- No Escape (1994), Absolom
- Green Lantern (1994), Slabside Island
- Venus Rising (1995)
- Street Sharks (1995)
- The Rock (1996), Alcatraz
- Escape from L.A. (1996), Los Angeles
- Dark Savior (1996)
- Realms of Arkania: Shadows over Riva (1996)
- Riven (1997)
- A Scare at Bedtime (1998), Hole Island
- Xena: Warrior Princess (1999)
- Harry Potter and the Prisoner of Azkaban (1999), Azkaban
- JoJo's Bizarre Adventure: Stone Ocean (1999), Green Dolphin Street Prison, aka "The Aquarium", Florida
- Resident Evil – Code: Veronica (2000), Rockfort Island in the Southern Ocean
- Sonic Adventure 2 (2001), Prison Island
- Captain Nemo: The Fantastic History of a Dark Genius (2002), Rura Penthe
- Ghosthunter (2003), Devil's Scar Penitentiary
- Monsieur N. (2003), Saint Helena
- Eberron (2004), Dreadhold
- Sonic X (2004)
- The Suffering (2004), Carnate Island, Maryland
- A Feast for Crows (2005), Ghaston Grey
- Seed (2007)
- Poptropica (2007)
- The Inmates of Summer, SpongeBob SquarePants (2007), Inferno Island
- Airman (2008), Little Saltee
- Golgo 13 (2008), Pandora Island
- NoviCraft (2008)
- Castlevania: Order of Ecclesia (2008), Minera Prison Island
- Avatar: The Last Airbender (2008), Boiling Rock
- Superjail! (2008), Superjail Island
- Xenoblade Chronicles (2010), Prison Island
- Mazinkaizer SKL (2010)
- World of Warcraft: Cataclysm (2010)
- Brooklyn Without Limits (2010), Usa
- Dead Island (2011)
- Arrow (2012), Purgatory
- Iris II: New Generation (2013)
- Might & Magic X: Legacy (2014), Fort Laegaire
- Gotham (2015)
- Prisoner 489 (2015)
- Kaijumax (2015)
- Mysterious Joker (2015), Demon's Heaven
- Tales of Zestiria the X (2016)
- Divinity: Original Sin II (2017), Fort Joy
- Rage of Bahamut (2017),
- World of Warcraft: Battle for Azeroth (2018), Fate's End
- Revenger (2018)
- Dream SMP (2020), Pandora's Vault
- One Shot (2021)
- Pennyworth (2022), Hebrides
- The Bad Guys (2022), Super Ultra Crazy Max, Los Angeles
- Diablo Immortal (2022), Stormpoint
- Octopath Traveler II (2023), Frigit Isle
- Sonic the Hedgehog 3 (film) (2024)
