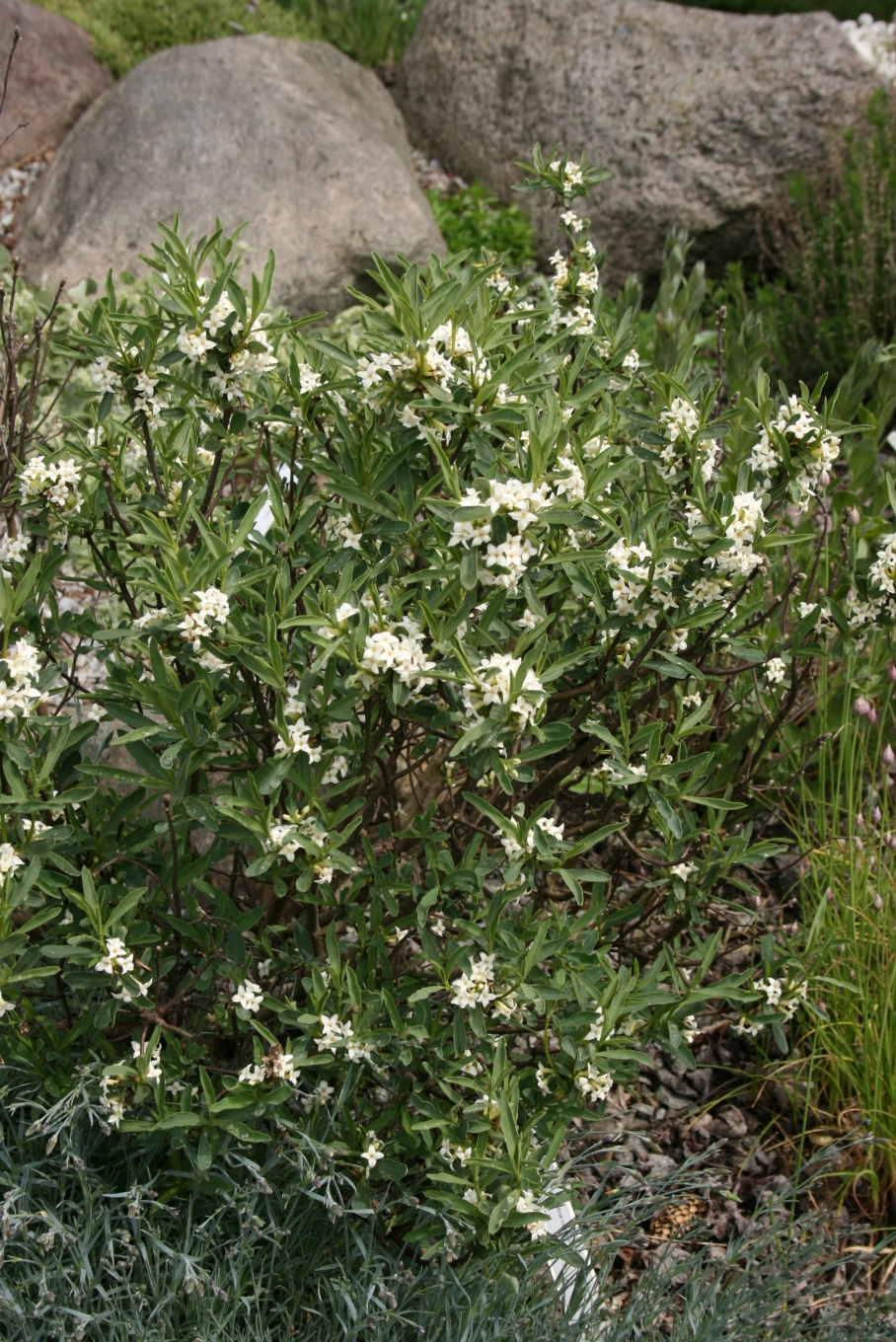

Scientific classification
- Kingdom: Plantae
- Clade: Tracheophytes
- Clade: Angiosperms
- Clade: Eudicots
- Clade: Rosids
- Order: Malvales
- Family: Thymelaeaceae
- Genus: Daphne
- Species: D. caucasica

Binomial name
- Daphne caucasica Pall.

Synonyms
- Daphne euphorbioides Puschk. ex Steud.; Daphne salicifolia Lam.

= Daphne caucasica =

Species of shrub

Daphne caucasica is a shrub, of the family Thymelaeaceae. It is evergreen, and is native to the Caucasus. It is a parent, with Daphne sericea (D. collina), of the popular hybrid garden plant Daphne × transatlantica.

== Taxonomy ==
This species was described in 1784 by Peter Simon Pallas, but in 1798 Friedrich August Marschall von Bieberstein created the identical name for a plant that is now considered a synonym of Daphne oleoides.

== Description ==
The shrub grows to a height of 3 to 6 feet (0.91 to 1.83 m). It tends to grow small and rounded. It has small white flowers that grow in clusters, and yellow or brown fruit. It flowers mostly from May to June, and to a smaller degree after June through frost.

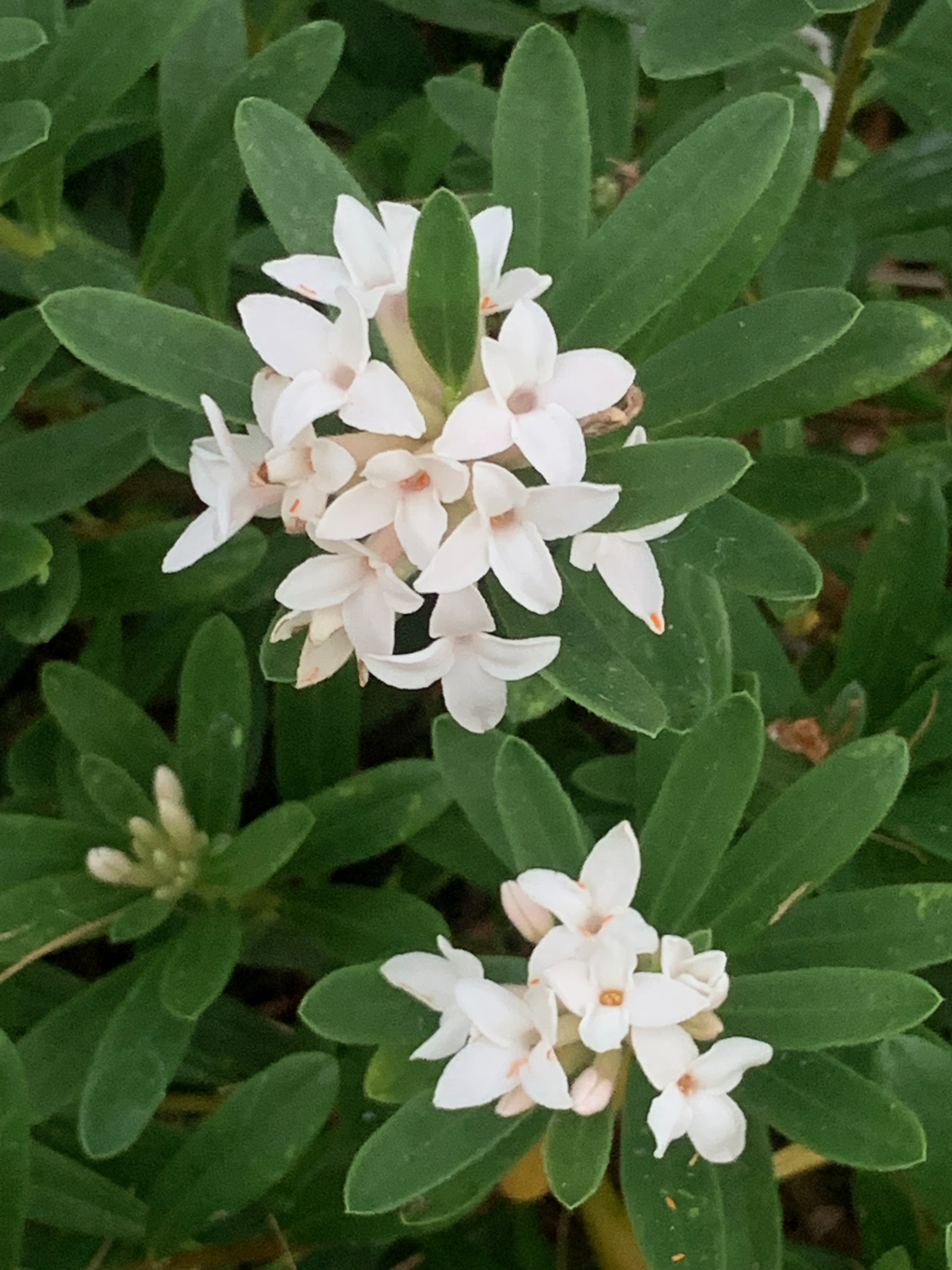
Daphne × transatlantica 'Eternal Fragrance' = 'Blafra'
