= Ghosthunter (video game) =

2003 video game

- European cover art
- Developer: SCEE Cambridge Studio
- Publishers: EU: Sony Computer Entertainment; NA: Namco Hometek; JP: Electronic Arts
- Director: James Shepherd
- Producer: James Shepherd
- Designers: James Shepherd; Gareth Hughes; Phil Mansell
- Programmer: Julian Rex
- Artist: Jason Wilson
- Writers: James Shepherd; Jonathan Ashley; Julian Rex; Jason Wilson
- Composer: Martin Rex
- Platform: PlayStation 2
- Release: EU: 3 December 2003; UK: 5 December 2003; NA: 17 August 2004; JP: 2 September 2004
- Genres: Action, third-person shooter
- Mode: Single-player

Ghosthunter is a third-person shooter video game developed by SCEE Cambridge Studio and published by Sony Computer Entertainment for the PlayStation 2. It was released in Europe in December 2003, in North America by Namco Hometek in August 2004 and in Japan by Electronic Arts in September 2004. The game is based primarily around ghost hunting, and tells the story of Lazarus Jones, a rookie detective with the Detroit Police Department, who accidentally releases a group of imprisoned ghosts from their confinement. When one of the ghosts kidnaps his partner, Jones must enter the ghost realm to track her down. The game received mixed reviews upon release, with critics praising its graphics but criticizing its brevity and linearity.

== Gameplay ==
Basic gameplay in Ghosthunter. Jones' health is on the bottom left; his ammo on the bottom right and his grenade icon on the top left.

Ghosthunter is a third-person shooter in which players control the protagonist, Lazarus Jones, with the left analog stick. The right analog stick is used to move the camera, or adjust aim when in combat or first-person mode. When in default third-person mode, Jones has a full range of movement, but he cannot shoot. To do so, the player must enter combat mode, which places a crosshair on screen. When in combat mode, Jones' lateral motion changes to strafing, and he moves slower. Jones can also shoot whilst in first-person mode, although he is unable to move. The game features two types of ammo; normal ammo for the handgun and shotgun, and "ghost energy" for the other weapons. Ghost energy can be collected in the form of orbs found throughout the game and dropped by defeated enemies.

When the player encounters a ghost, they must first shoot it to weaken it to a point where it can be captured. Capturing a ghost is accomplishing by hitting it with a "Capture Grenade." If the player uses the grenade before weakening the ghost sufficiently for capture, the grenade attaches itself to the enemy for a limited time, and a health meter appears. If Jones depletes the health meter whilst the grenade is still attached, the monster will be captured. The grenade can also be used to pick up ghost energy and health orbs which the player cannot physically reach.

As well as controlling Jones, the player can also control Astral, a spirit which Jones can call in specific locations. Astral levitates rather than walks, and has no offensive capabilities. Instead, the player has access to different "forms", such as a Revenant form which allows her to walk and interact with switches, a charming form which allows her to trick ghosts into following her, a spectral form which allows her to warp through walls and floors at special warp points, a poltergeist form which allows her to throw objects, and a possession form which allows her control certain ghosts.

Ghosthunter is one of the relatively rare examples of a game featuring a false ending; Jones is killed, apparently for good, and the game returns to the title screen, inviting the player to start over. However, within moments, the game begins again, with the player in control of another character.

== Plot ==
The game begins at Montsaye High, an abandoned school in Detroit, where Detective Lazarus Jones (voiced by Rob Paulsen) of the Detroit Police Department is on his first day on the job. He is on a routine call with his partner, Anna Steele (Nan McNamara), to investigate reports of unusual sounds in the building. Steele explains that several years previously, a professor murdered ten students, and then disappeared. He was never found, nor was any murder weapon, and the coroner was unable to determine the cause of death of any of the victims. After the two split up to investigate the building, Jones discovers a laboratory in the basement. He presses a switch on a machine, which seems to release a gas of some kind. He is knocked out and when he regains consciousness, he goes to meet Steele in the sewers. However, before he can prevent it, Steele is dragged into a pipe by a transparent man.

Jones returns to the lab, where a sentient computer (Joe Morton) explains that when he pressed the button, he shut down an array containing imprisoned ghosts, and he must now set about recapturing them. The program also tells him that he has "supernormal sight"; he can see ghosts with the naked eye. He has acquired this ability because he has fused with Astral; a spirit who wishes to aid him in his quest. The program also explains that his only hope of getting Steele back is to find Professor Richmond, who created the lab. His location, however, is unknown, so Jones must use the "Spectral Gateway" to jump to ghost realms, fighting ghosts until he finds Richmond.

After heading to a ghost town, where he saves a young girl from the clutches of the spirit of Lady DeMontford (Jane Hamilton), Jones returns to the lab and learns that Astral's real name is Kate Heller, and she was Richmond's assistant. She is still alive, but her physical location is unknown. Jones then encounters the spirit of the Montsaye librarian (Jane Hamilton) who tells him the legend of the thirteenth century English knight, Sir William Hawksmoor (Michael Gambon); the man Jones saw abduct Steele. A trusted servant of the king, he eventually became too powerful, and a group of aristocrats killed him. Jones also learns that Richmond did not commit the murders in the school. He returned from a journey through the Gateway to find the bodies of the students. Pursuing the murderer, he eventually caught up with Hawksmoor, who explained that he murdered the students to make Richmond follow him. However, Richmond was able to capture Hawksmoor and place him in the array, until he was inadvertently released by Jones.

Jones next encounters a ghost ship, where he aids a group of English World War II soldiers, led by Colonel Freddie Fortesque (Michael Cochrane), defeat a monster whom they have been fighting since the War. He then heads to a prison island, Devil's Scar Penitentiary, where he encounters Frank Agglin (André Sogliuzzo), a former police officer who killed several people, including his wife, before being executed by electric chair. Jones, however, discovers that Agglin was possessed by Hawksmoor. He eventually finds Richmond (Joe Morton), but they are attacked by Agglin. Jones defeats him, and Richmond explains that when he captured Agglin's spirit and placed it into the array, Hawksmoor was able to trace Richmond back to Montsaye, resulting in the murders. Richmond reveals that Hawksmoor has Kate's physical body, but he needs Astral, although Richmond is unsure why. He and Jones then head to a secret military base, where Richmond worked during the 1970s, undertaking paranormal research for the government. He explains Kate became trapped in the Astral form due to an experiment that went wrong. She then fused with Richmond as she has now fused with Jones, and they began hunting ghosts. However, Hawksmoor proposed a deal to the military executives of the base - if they granted him Kate's body, as well the right to exploit Richmond, he would destroy their enemies. Learning of this, Richmond fled the base with Kate, going to work in Montsaye High, before Hawksmoor tracked him down.

Richmond then betrays Jones, handing him over to Hawksmoor in return for being allowed to leave. As Richmond departs, Hawksmoor uses a machine to extract Astral from Jones. Steele, who is possessed by Hawksmoor, then shoots and kills Jones. However, Richmond's computer program takes control of a heavily armed robotic unit. It encounters Jones' ghost, which it leads to the "Resurrection Machine" – a machine which can reunite a spirit with its physical form. Richmond had discovered that every person who dies before their "allotted time" becomes a ghost, but over a long period of time, each ghost fades away, eventually ceasing to exist. Hawksmoor is attempting to prevent this happening by using the machine, which needs Astral's ghost energy to work. Lazarus is resurrected as Hawksmoor arrives and flings the robot from the balcony. Hawksmoor then enters the machine, but before he can activate it, Richmond returns, giving weapons to Lazarus and Steele, who is now free of Hawksmoor's possession. They destroy the machine and Lazarus battles Hawksmoor, as Richmond finds the robot damaged beyond repair. However, it is in possession of a zero bomb, a device capable of utterly destroying a ghost. Lazarus and Steele flee and Richmond sets off the bomb, killing himself, Hawksmoor and, presumably, Astral. Steele and Jones make it back to the school and joke about how hard it is going to be to write their report.

== Development ==
With Ghosthunter, SCEE Studio Cambridge has created a dark, atmospheric fantasy that will appeal to both gamers and horror fans. The game utilizes the PlayStation 2's technical capabilities to combine film-quality graphics and sound with well-developed characters and a compelling storyline, delivering a rich, cinematic experience that fully captures the essence of the action-horror genre.

— Chris Deering; SCEE president

The origin of the game was SCE Cambridge Studio's desire to do "a very high concept dark adult, James Bond/Ghostbusters" type game. Each of the team looked to their favorite horror films for inspiration, as well as to other survival horror games. They were also particularly inspired by Metal Gear Solid 2: Sons of Liberty.

The game was first announced on April 22, 2003, with SCEE revealing a plot outline, the main characters, and the basic game mechanics. It was also revealed that the game would run off a tweaked version of the Primal game engine, with new special effects technology used to produce the game's "cinema-grade effects." Playable demos of a 60% complete build were first shown at the August 2003 Games Convention in Leipzig, with a European release date slated for November. The game was also shown at the September 2003 PlayStation Experience in London.

The game was released in Europe in December, but did not sell very well, and was not initially picked up for North American release, with Sony choosing not to publish it themselves. In April 2004, Namco Hometek announced that they would publish the game in North America, with release slated for August. The North American localization was first previewed at the 2004 E3 event in May. For the North American version of the game, over 1,500 fixes and improvements were made, with the grenade targeting system and the camera and combat systems refined. Some of the puzzles were made easier, but combat was made harder.

== Reception ==
Reception

Aggregate score
| Aggregator | Score |
|---|---|
| Metacritic | 69/100 |

Review scores
| Publication | Score |
|---|---|
| Eurogamer | 6/10 |
| Famitsu | 29/40 |
| GameRevolution | C |
| GameSpot | 8/10 |
| GameSpy | 2.5/5 |
| IGN | 8.4/10 |
| Official U.S. PlayStation Magazine | 2.5/5 |

Ghosthunter received "mixed or average reviews," according to the review aggregation website Metacritic.

Eurogamer's Ronan Jennings argued its only real positive attribute were its graphics, of which he wrote, "there are times in it where I have never seen anything so impressive in a game. As you'd expect, things like texture detail and animation are superb, but it's not these aspects that steal the show. Rather it's the combination of breathtaking lighting and wonderful art that do the trick ... In Ghosthunter, there are certain scenes that made me stop playing and mutter 'my god' to myself." However, he was critical of the level design, the Astral-related puzzles and the "clunky" combat system. He concluded, "Ghosthunter once again raises the 'aesthetics versus gameplay' debate. It sports a stunning-looking world that's comfortable and satisfying to explore but for some reason the developer has tarnished this with a god-awful set of enemies and infuriating level design."

GameRevolution's Brian Gee praised the graphics, but found the overall experience lacking: "While Ghosthunter sets up a freaky scene, it never does much to distinguish itself from your average action game. There are no big scares and only mildly interesting action."

GameSpy's Justin Leeper was critical of the combat mode and the puzzles, and although he praised the graphics, he concluded that "good graphics do not a good game make, and I don't consider Ghosthunter a particularly good game. It's passable at best, and surpassed by The Suffering in nearly every aspect. Sadly, Sony had the right idea in not bringing this title to the U.S., as it simply brings nothing new to the table.

GameSpot's Alex Navarro was more impressed, arguing that it struck a good balance between survival horror and action; "The primary reason Ghosthunter works is that it seems to have a very firm grip on what it wants to be. It knows it isn't scary enough to really fit into the survival horror genre, but it's too creepy to be considered just a standard action game. Ghosthunter falls squarely in between the two, and it manages to keep an almost uncanny balance all throughout the game." He too was impressed by the graphics, but was critical of the game's length. He concluded "Ghosthunter is a very enjoyable experience for as long as it lasts. Most players should be able to forgive its relative simplicity thanks to its excellent ambiance and entertaining characters and storyline."

IGN's Ivan Sulic was also impressed, arguing the game features "a level of environmental diversity and intrigue that most titles never come close to approaching ... this plush design is only strengthened by one of the most impressive engines found on PlayStation 2. What Ghosthunter does for the eyes and ears, we simply do not see that often. Rare is the PS2 game that is this crisp, this well-defined, this polished, this flicker free, and this extravagantly detailed." He was less impressed with the gameplay, writing "The combat here simply does not match the applied presentation value. What we have in terms of action is an affable, but repetitive affair with marginal challenge attached." However, he concluded by praising the "game's incredible presentation with slick support for progressive scan, widescreen display, and a penchant for utterly astonishing graphics and superlative audio effects." In 2010, IGN placed the game in their list of "The Top 10 Best Looking PS2 Games of All Time".
