= Grmožur =

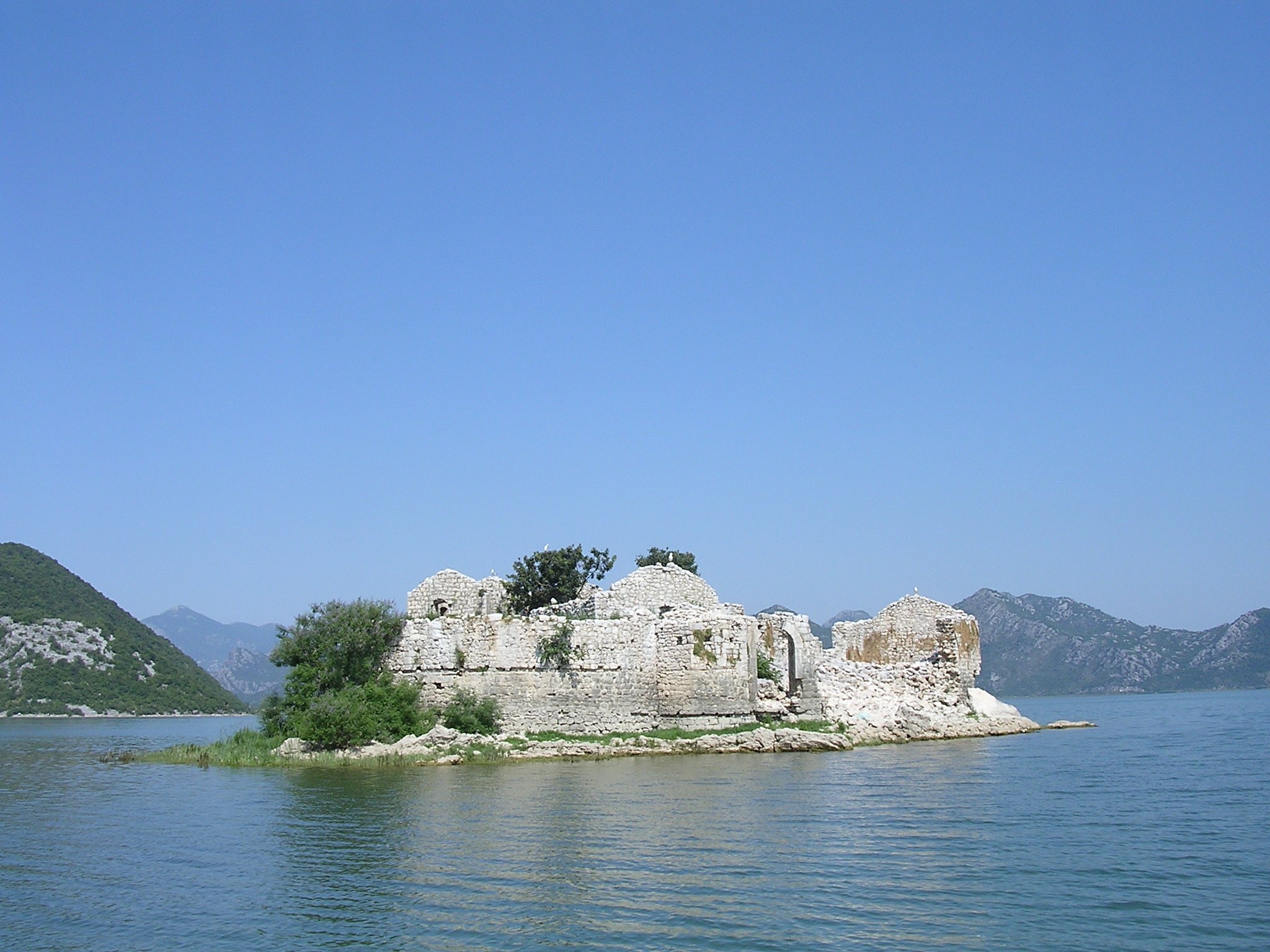
- Interactive map of Grmožur

Geography
- Coordinates: 42°14′11″N 19°07′56″E
- Adjacent to: Lake Skadar

Administration
- Montenegro

Grmožur (Montenegrin: Грможур) is a fortified islet in Lake Skadar, located near the village of Godinje, in the Montenegrin municipality of Bar. The island was nicknamed the Island of Snakes by the local population, and the Island of Birds by ornithologists, since it is a common nesting site.

== Fortification ==
Fortification on the island was built by the Ottomans in 1843, and conquered by Montenegrins in 1878, following the Montenegrin–Ottoman War (1876–78). Shortly thereafter it was transformed into a prison island.
