= Grotte di Pilato =

The Grotte di Pilato (Italian: "Grottoes of Pilate") are a complex system of tunnels and pools in the island of Ponza, Italy. Dug to sea level, they are from the Roman period. Many locals believe they were used to raise moray eels.

In 1997 a Roman statue was discovered submerged in one of the tunnels.
