= Chiaia di Luna =

Bay and beach on the island of Ponza in Italy

Coordinates: 40°53′38″N 12°57′06″E

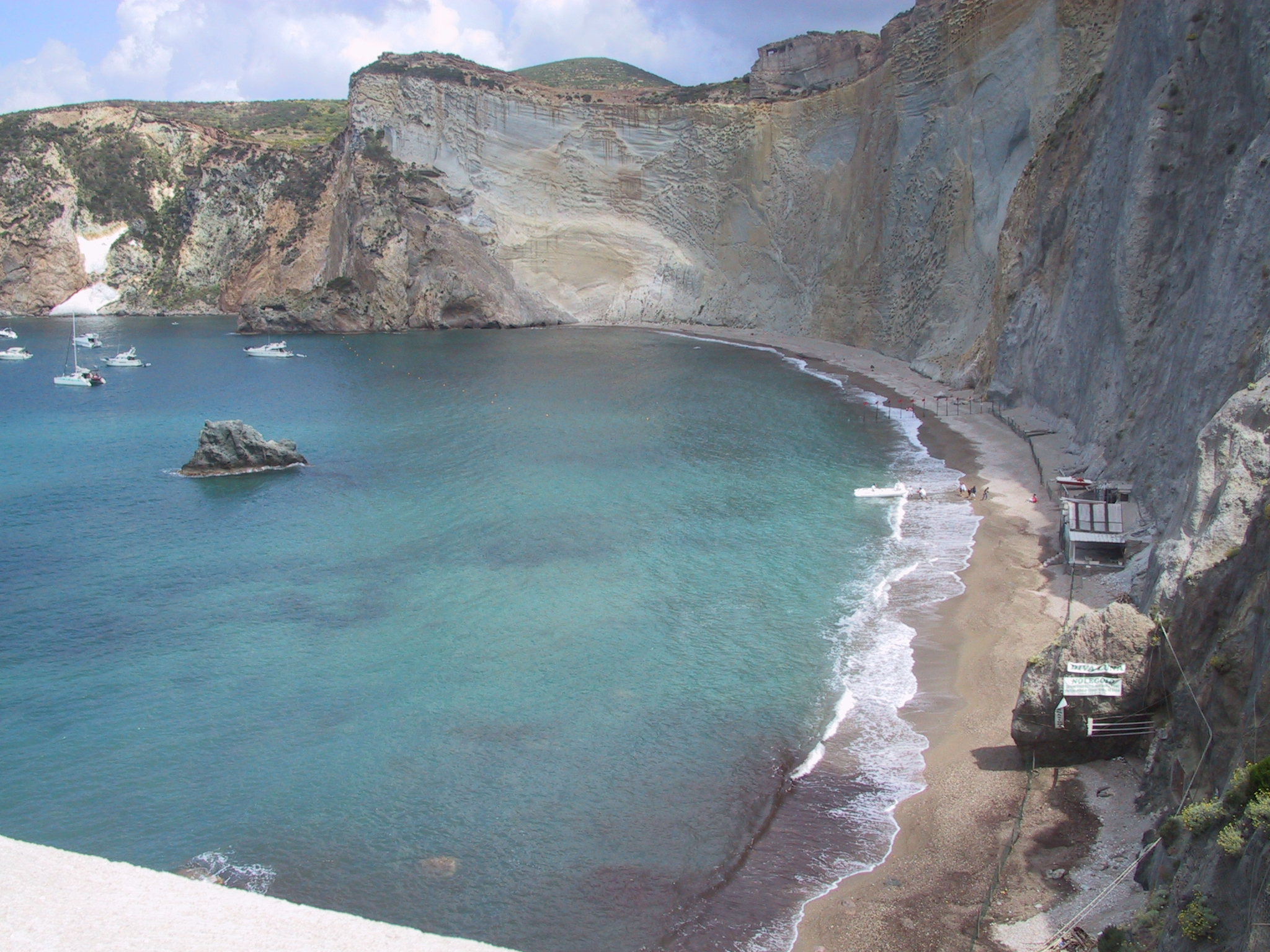
Chiaia di Luna in Ponza

Chiaia di Luna is a bay and a beach on the island of Ponza in Italy.

== Name ==
In the local Neapolitan dialect, chiaia means "beach". As luna means "moon", the name of the bay refers to the beach's crescent-moon shape.

== Geography ==
The bay, which is the island's largest, is located along the south-western shore of Ponza. It is enclosed by high tuff cliffs that dominate over the thin strip of sand of the beach. Due to the instability of these rock formations, access to the beach is forbidden.

The bay is delimited by Punta del Fieno to the south and by Punta di Capo Bianco to the north.
