= Santi Silverio e Domitilla, Ponza =

Santi Silverio e Domitilla
- Chiesa dei Santi Silverio e Domitilla (Italian)
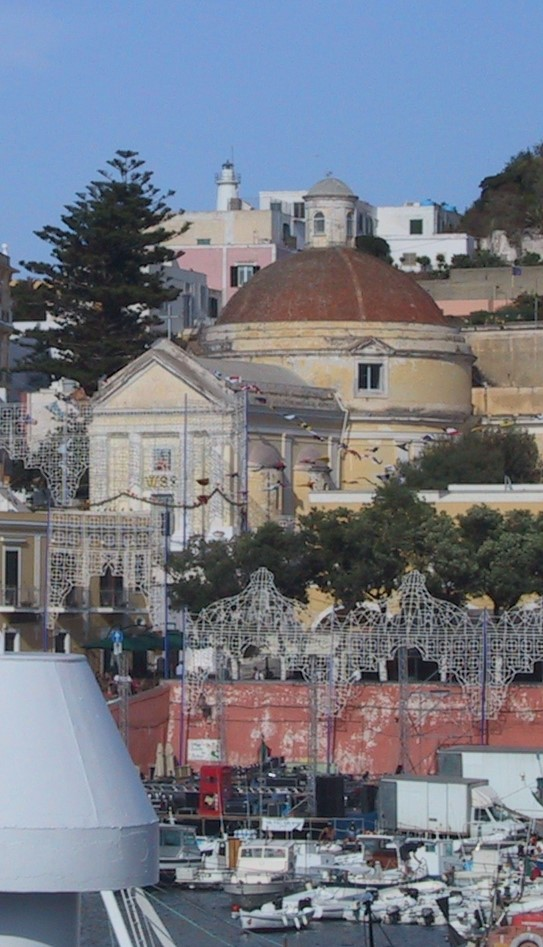
- Santi Silverio e Domitilla, Ponza in 2024
- Click on the map for a fullscreen view
- 40°53′41.63″N 12°58′00.94″E
- Country: Italy
- Denomination: Roman Catholic

Architecture
- Functional status: Active

Administration
- Diocese: Archdiocese of Gaeta

Santi Silverio e Domitilla is a Roman Catholic church located in Ponza, Italy.

== History ==
A first place of worship was built under the Bourbons and dedicated in 1738 to the Holy Trinity. The current church was erected between 1775 and 1779 by Major Antonio Winspeare of the Civil Engineering Corps, as part of the repopulation project for the islands of Ponza and Ventotene. The solemn consecration of the high altar was celebrated by the Bishop of Gaeta, Carlo Pergamo, on September 4, 1778, after he had dedicated the island to Saint Silverius and Saint Domitilla in 1772.

In 1940, the building underwent an expansion, initiated by the parish priest Luigi Maria Dies, which involved the incorporation of the pronaos and thus transformed the layout of the nave from a central plan to a longitudinal one. On that occasion, both the dome and the other interior walls were decorated.

== Description ==
The church, located in the village of Ponza above the port area, features a neoclassical style. The façade is characterized by semi-columns and pilasters supporting a large triangular pediment. At the center is the main entrance portal, preceded by a staircase of seven steps.

== Gallery ==
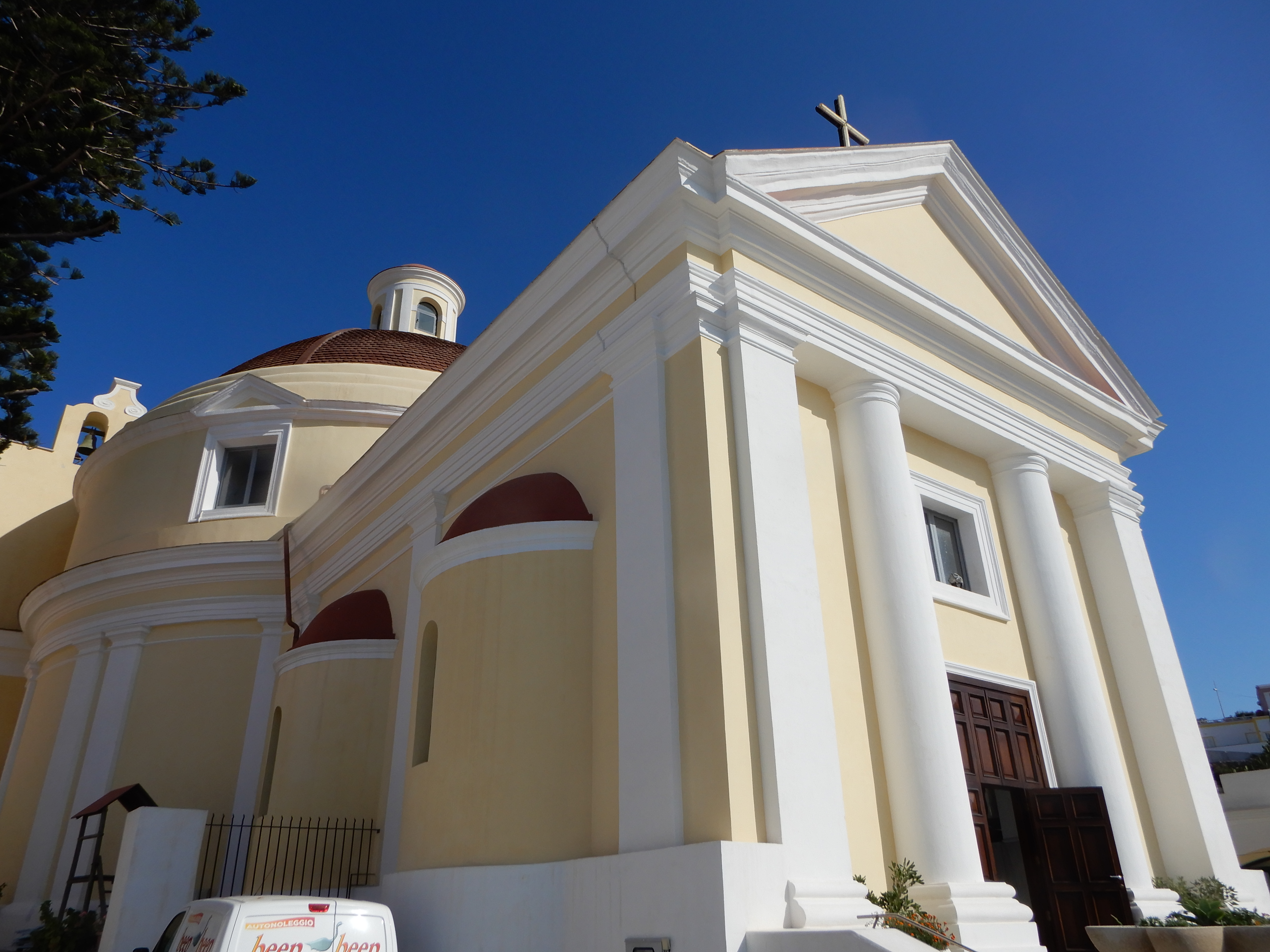

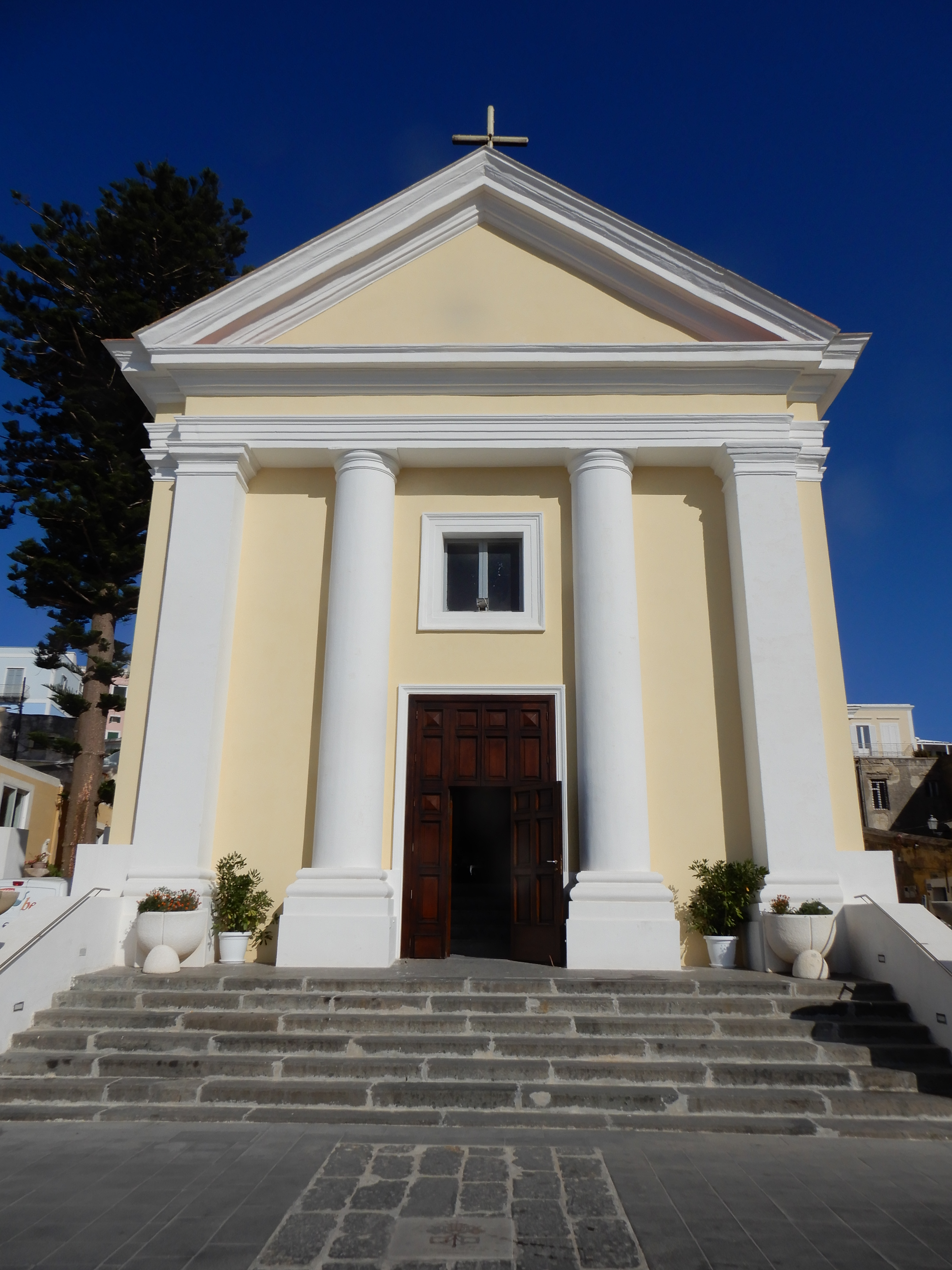

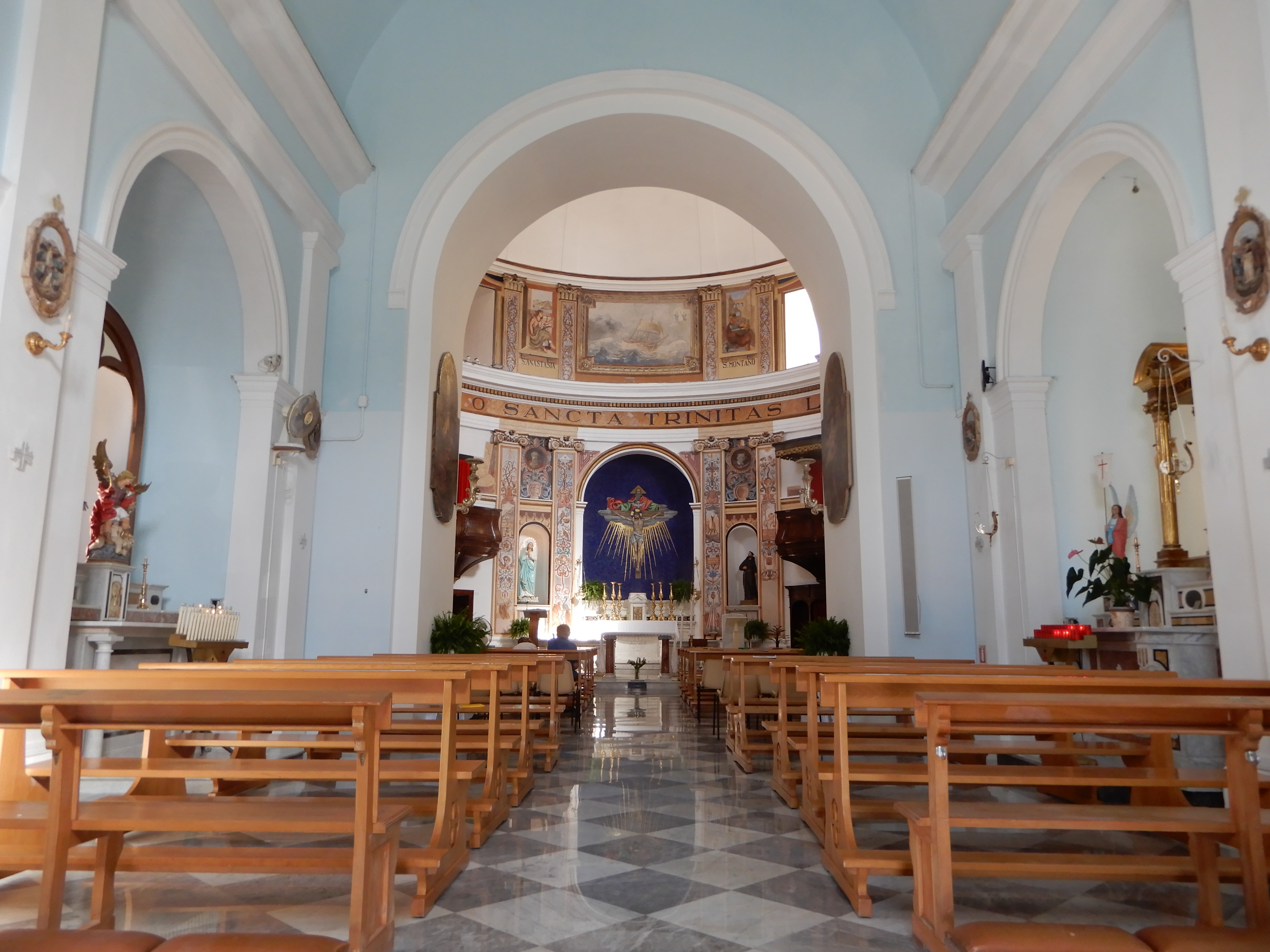
