= Idionymon =

Political crime in Greece from 1929 to 1974

Idionymon (Greek: ιδιώνυμο, literally "that which has its own name", also translated as "special illegal act" or delictum sui generis), is a Greek legal term referring to a criminal offense which is treated distinctly from the general categories in the Greek Penal Code it would otherwise fit into (i.e. is given its own name) due to the particularity of the circumstances involved. While the concept covers many commonplace criminal offenses, the term is used in particular to refer to a 1929 law directed against left-wing political dissidents who sought to violently overthrow the government.

== Legal term ==
In Greek criminal law, an idionymous crime (ιδιώνυμο έγκλημα) is a crime the constituent acts of which are already covered by an existing definition in the Penal Code but which is nonetheless treated as a completely separate criminal offense due to the particularity of the circumstances involved.

Idionymous crimes are distinguished from mitigating and aggravating factors that change the penalty for a crime without turning it into a different crime. Examples of idionymous crimes include assaulting a minor (a separate crime to assault), assisted suicide (a separate crime to homicide) and theft in desperate need (a separate crime to theft).

The term can also refer to crimes the constituent acts of which are normally legal but which become criminal in particular circumstances, usually involving a connection to a different criminal act. These include intentional inebriation leading to an illegal act, participation in a quarrel resulting in violence and membership of a criminal organisation.

== Idionymon of 1929 ==
In common and historical discourse, the term 'idionymon' is used in particular to refer to the crime established by Law 4229 of 1929 ("concerning safety measures for the social establishment and protection of freedom"), introduced by the liberal government of Eleftherios Venizelos, which established a penalty of six months imprisonment for anyone "who attempts to apply ideas that have as an obvious target the violent overthrow of the current social system, or who acts in propagandizing their application". The law was directed against communists and anarchists and was used to enforce repression against the trade union movement. By the end of 1930, the law had been used to ban and dissolve most worker's organizations affiliated with the far-left. The idionymon was the first of a series of legal measures directed against the Communist Party of Greece, the calls to violent revolution of which were considered a growing threat by the Greek establishment in the inter-war years, culminating in the brutal persecution of communists and socialists by the Metaxas regime.

The establishment of the idionymon resulted from the perceived need to defend the gains of the republican reforms of Venizelos' Liberal party against the growing threat of leftist insurrection. The Second Hellenic Republic was inherently unstable, and furthermore, by the late 1920s, the old political dualism between Venizelists and Royalists was beginning to be threatened by agitation in the emerging working class. The defeat of the Asia Minor Campaign in 1922, which resulted in the arrival of over 1.5 million refugees, mostly impoverished and living in atrocious conditions, resulted in the emergence, for the first time, of a large urban working class, to whom the radical/communist ideas of the Russian Revolution might appeal.

Two of the leaders of the liberal opposition in Parliament, Alexandros Papanastasiou and Georgios Kafantaris, had expressed strong disagreement during the vote. It is notable that Eleftherios Venizelos rejected Papanastasiou's proposal to use the idionymon against fascists as well as communists, although it is perhaps understandable in light of the far-right's low political presence in Greece at the time (relative to socialists) and Venizelos' ongoing diplomatic rapprochement with Fascist Italy.

Following the establishment of the dictatorial "4th of August Regime" in 1936, the idionymon was replaced by Emergency Law 117/1936 ("concerning measures to combat communism and the consequences thereof"), which allowed authorities to require people to sign declarations condemning communism, refusal to sign which would be taken as evidence of guilt, and added harsher penalties, including five-year jail terms and internal exile in Greece. These measures remained in effect until 1945, when they were superseded by the Treaty of Varkiza, which legalised the Communist Party and prohibited persecution of its members. Nonetheless, measures similar to the idionymon were re-introduced by the democratically elected post-war government through Emergency Law 509 of 1947, in the context of the Greek Civil War and remained in effect until their final repeal by Decree-Law 59 of September 1974, introduced by the transitional government following the end of the Regime of the Colonels.
