= Lucia Rosa =

19th century girl who threw herself into the sea

Faraglioni of Lucia Rosa, a series of sea stacks named for the legend.

Lucia Rosa was a girl from the 19th century who wanted to marry a poor farmer and instead was forced by her father to marry a wealthy man she did not want. In despair, she threw herself into the Tyrrhenian Sea on the northwest side of the island of Ponza, Italy. She is viewed by some women as a martyr for women's rights and a symbol for human rights. A beach and a group of tall rock stacks (the 'faraglioni di Lucia Rossa') are named after her, at the place where she died.
