= Ponza =

Italian island

Coordinates: 40°54′27″N 12°57′9″E

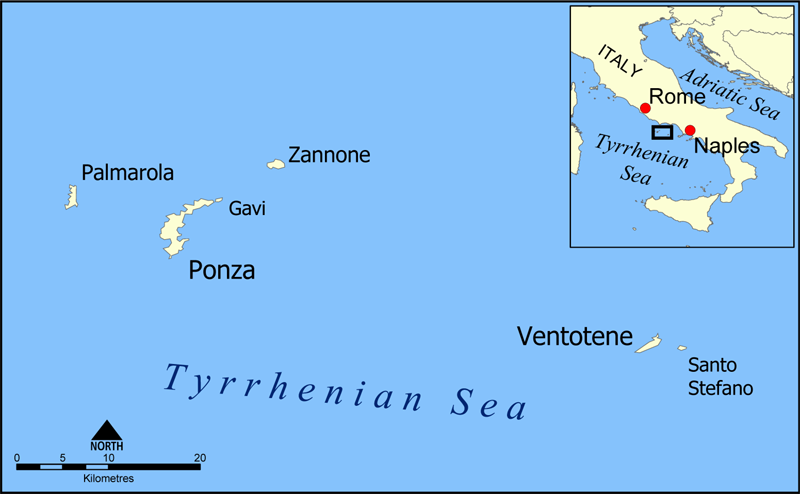
Ponza and the Pontine Islands.

Ponza (Italian: isola di Ponza [ˈiːzola di ˈpontsa]) is the largest island of the Italian Pontine Islands archipelago, located 33 km (21 mi) south of Cape Circeo in the Tyrrhenian Sea. It is also the name of the commune of the island, a part of the province of Latina in the Lazio region.

== History ==
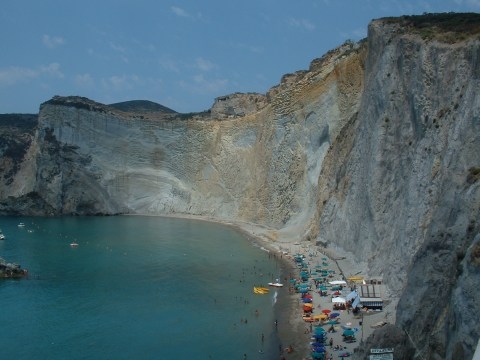
The most popular beach at Ponza, Chiaia di Luna.

View of the harbor.

The island was inhabited from neolithic through Roman times. According to local legends, Ponza was named after Pontius Pilate, Roman governor of Judea who tried Jesus of Nazareth for sedition against Roman rule. Pontius Pilate's family owned a grotto on Ponza, which is still named after him. The Pontius Pilate legend of Ponza's name has recently come into dispute amongst historians, because the name "Pontia" appears in Strabo's Geography. This pre-dates the birth of Pilate. It is not known if this is the same name as Ponza or a similar name. Also, Pontia means "Land of Bridges" in Latin, a name which could have been applied for Ponza's many naturally occurring arches and bridge-like landforms. Another theory is that the name is of Greek origin, from Greek pontos, πόντος, sea (see also Pontus).

=== Greek and Roman periods ===
In ancient times the island was called Tyrrhenia. Legend says that Ponza is what is left of the lost island of Tyrrhenia. Ponza is said to have been connected to the mainland by a narrow strip of land, which sank into the sea with most of the island below the water, with the parts remaining above sea level. The same exact phenomenon happened at Capri. According to legend, there was a large city on the ancient island. There has been significant archaeological progress recently that shows this may be true. For example, it was discovered that the harbor floor of nearby Pozzuoli had sunk and risen several times in the last 5,000 years, revealing sunken Roman temples.

Ponza was first colonised by Etruscans. The island was heavily forested with giant trees in ancient times, but the forest is gone and the hills are covered with man-made terraces. Most of these terraces are no longer being used to grow food and grapes and are falling apart, due to lack of maintenance. The tallest hill on the island, called Monte Guardia, still has the rotting stumps of the extinct giant trees over eight feet wide. Crops are grown on these terraces like grapes for wine and cactus pears and fig trees.

Ponza is also suspected to be the island of Aeaea in Homer's Odyssey, as the island of Circe the sorceress, where her cave or grotto was. Today it is known as Grotta della Maga Circe on the west side of the island, between Capo Bianco and Chiaia di Luna beach. She was said to have lived in this cave in the winter months, spending the summer atop nearby Mount Circe on the mainland of Italy. This is where Circe turned Odysseus' men into animals and cast her spell on and seduced and lived with him for over a year. On the west side of Ponza is the Grotta di Ulisse O Del Sangue, which means Cave of Ulysses or the Blood. The Grotto or cave is almost directly underneath the hill/peninsula called Il Belvedere, which has the Giardino Botanico Ponziano a botanical garden with a villa and the remains of a castle. These caves or grottoes are popular destinations to visit by boat only.

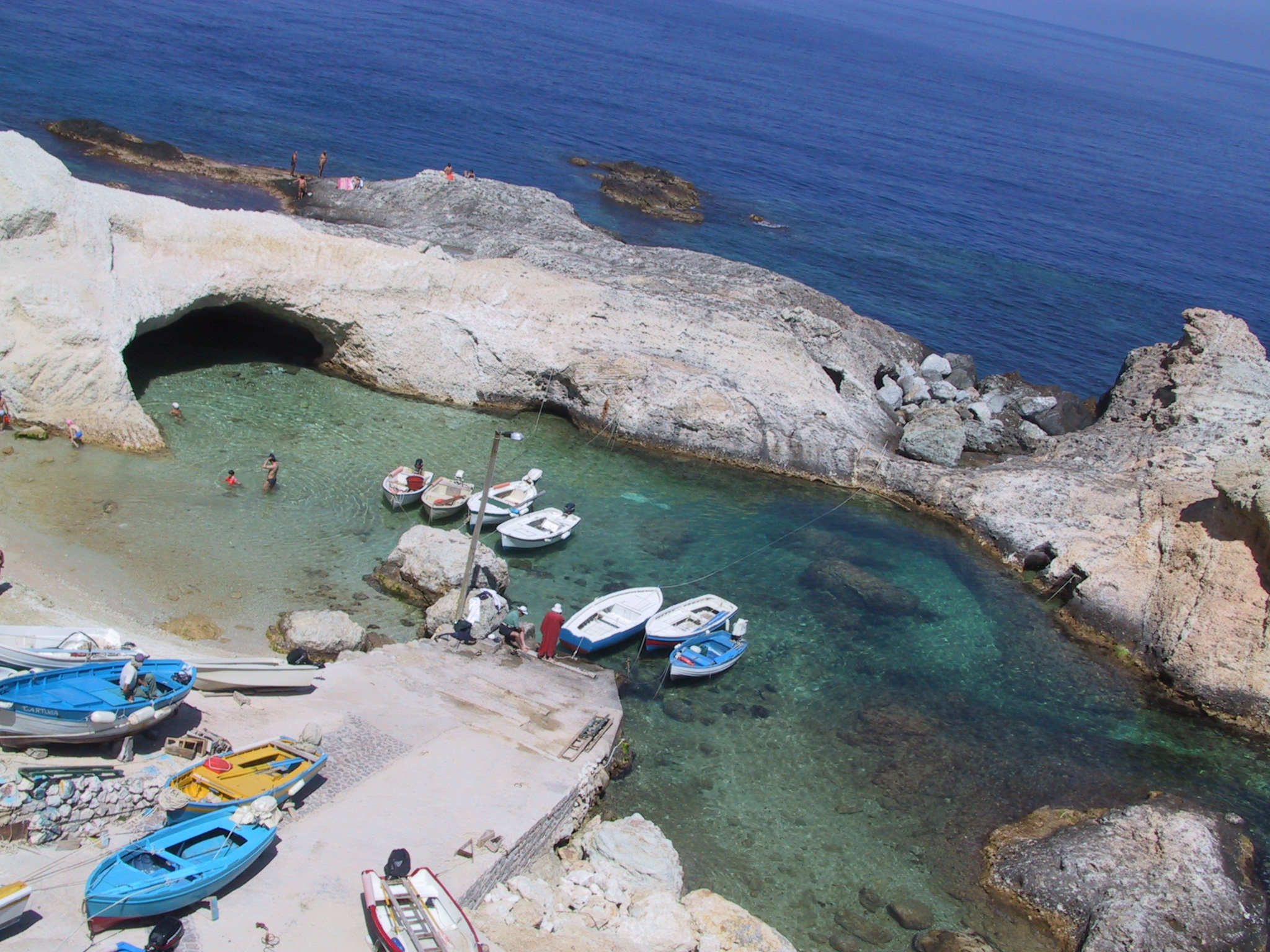
View of Cala Fonte harbour in Le Forna area

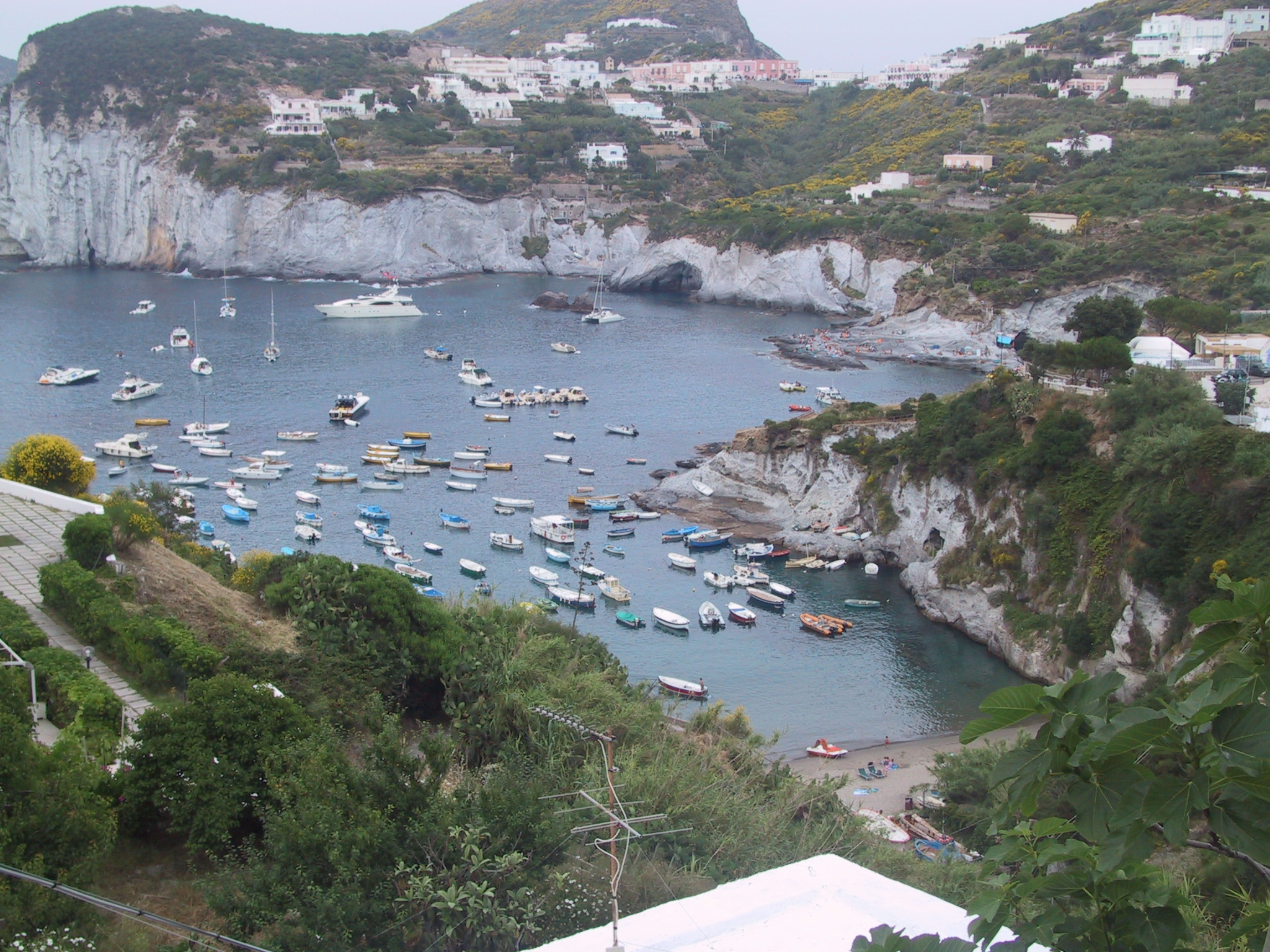
view of one of the most beautiful bays located in Le Forna area

During Roman times, Nero Caesar, eldest brother of Caligula, was deported to Ponza in AD 29, where he was put to death the following year. Two of his sisters, Agrippina the Younger (mother of the emperor Nero) and Julia Livilla, were exiled to Ponza in AD 39 for their complicity in a plot to overthrow Caligula. They were recalled to Rome in AD 41. Julia Livilla had a mansion named Palazzo Giulia (Julia's Palace) built specially for her on Ponza. The ruins are still visible. A similar mansion with the same name was also built on nearby Ventotene for Emperor Augustus' exiled daughter, Julia the Elder.

=== Middle Ages ===
Ponza was abandoned during the Middle Ages due to constant raids by Saracens and pirates. In 1552, the Ottoman fleet under the command of Turgut Reis (known as Dragut in the West) defeated the Spanish fleet of Emperor Charles V under the command of the famous Genoese admiral Andrea Doria near Ponza.

=== 1700–present ===
During the 18th century, the Kingdom of Naples re-colonized the island. In 1813 it was captured by British naval captain Charles Napier during the Napoleonic Wars.

The island became part of the Kingdom of Italy in the mid-19th century and it is now part of the Republic of Italy. The island's isolation destined it to serve as a penal colony by various regimes. During the two decades of fascism, Ponza and nearby Ventotene served as a prison for political opponents of Benito Mussolini's regime. The Ethiopian Prince Regent and military leader, Ras Immiru, who was captured by the Italian Army in 1936, was imprisoned in a house in Santa Maria. Mussolini himself was imprisoned on the island for several weeks after being overthrown and arrested in 1943. Left Communist theorist Amadeo Bordiga was also imprisoned on the island, and he returned after his imprisonment to build several houses.

The island is well known for the tragic story of Lucia Rosa who threw herself into the Tyrrhenian Sea rather than being forced to marry a man against her wishes. She is viewed by many women around the world as a martyr for women's rights and symbol for human rights.

A few years ago, engineers working on an ancient Roman tunnel that connected the harbour part of Ponza to the neighborhood of Santa Maria used explosives to dig a conduit nearby — they were supposed to use a chisel. The explosive shock shattered and destroyed a 2,100-year-old Roman gallery tunnel. The tunnel that connects Ponza with Santa Maria is now repaired, but many residents complain that it does not look like it used to, with steel reinforced concrete in place of Roman bricks.

Today, the island is a tourist attraction with sandy beaches like Chiaia di Luna (Half Moon Beach), now permanently closed due to falling rocks from the huge collapsing cliff above. Several tourists were killed a few years ago while sunbathing on the beach. The Italian National Park Service has installed steel cable netting to prevent further rock falls and deaths. The Roman Galleria or Roman Tunnel that connected the beach to the road is now closed because of collapsing Roman brickwork. Many beaches that were very popular are now permanently closed because falling rocks from overhead cliffs have killed vacationers.

In September of 2007, six "aquanauts" spent two weeks living underwater off the coast of Ponza, breaking all other records.

== Geography ==
Ponza and Gavi are the remains of a caldera rim of an extinct volcano, with a surface area of 7.3 square kilometres (2.8 square miles). Ponza is approximately 5.5 mi (8.9 km) long by 1.5 mi (2.4 km) at its widest. It is a crescent shaped island with one large beach called Spiaggia di Chiaia di Luna (Half Moon Beach) and a few small beaches and has a mostly rocky coast made of kaolin and tuff rock. The island has layers of Kaolinite and Bentonite which used to be mined. It has many odd natural rock formations, one looks like a monk, another looks like a giant pair of work pants, Spaccapurpo (Arco Naturale O Spaccapolpi), another looks like a patch of flowers and another one looks like mushrooms, another looks like a horseman. It has the Fantasy Rock Castle and several natural bridges and arches. It also has Faragliones or giant sea stacks made of solid rock. It has several small villages, among them are Commune di Ponza, Santa Maria and Le Forna. Ponza is often confused with nearby islands like Ischia and Capri, except Ponza has no active volcanism.

=== Climate ===
Ponza has a mediterranean climate (Köppen Csa) with hot and dry summers combined with mild and rainy winters. The annual average temperature is 17.14 °C (62.9 °F), the hottest month in August is 25.48 °C (77.9 °F), and the coldest month is 10.36 °C (50.6 °F) in February. The annual precipitation is 627.21 millimetres (24.69 in), of which November is the wettest with 116.7 millimetres (4.59 in), while July is the driest with only 9.13 millimetres (0.36 in).

Climate data for Ponza, elevation: 184 m or 604 ft, 1991–2020 normals, extremes 1946–present
Month	Jan	Feb	Mar	Apr	May	Jun	Jul	Aug	Sep	Oct	Nov	Dec	Year
Record high °C (°F)	18.1 (64.6)	20.0 (68.0)	22.0 (71.6)	28.0 (82.4)	29.0 (84.2)	33.5 (92.3)	37.3 (99.1)	35.6 (96.1)	32.6 (90.7)	27.3 (81.1)	25.7 (78.3)	19.8 (67.6)	37.2 (99.0)
Mean daily maximum °C (°F)	12.4 (54.3)	12.4 (54.3)	14.2 (57.6)	16.7 (62.1)	20.9 (69.6)	25.3 (77.5)	27.9 (82.2)	28.6 (83.5)	25.1 (77.2)	21.1 (70.0)	17.0 (62.6)	13.6 (56.5)	19.6 (67.3)
Daily mean °C (°F)	10.7 (51.3)	10.4 (50.7)	11.9 (53.4)	14.0 (57.2)	18.0 (64.4)	22.2 (72.0)	24.8 (76.6)	25.5 (77.9)	22.4 (72.3)	18.9 (66.0)	15.2 (59.4)	11.9 (53.4)	17.1 (62.8)
Mean daily minimum °C (°F)	9.3 (48.7)	8.7 (47.7)	10.0 (50.0)	12.0 (53.6)	15.6 (60.1)	19.7 (67.5)	22.3 (72.1)	23.1 (73.6)	20.3 (68.5)	17.1 (62.8)	13.6 (56.5)	10.5 (50.9)	15.2 (59.4)
Record low °C (°F)	−2.0 (28.4)	−0.5 (31.1)	−2.6 (27.3)	2.8 (37.0)	7.8 (46.0)	10.2 (50.4)	13.4 (56.1)	15.0 (59.0)	11.5 (52.7)	7.0 (44.6)	2.2 (36.0)	0.6 (33.1)	−2.6 (27.3)
Average precipitation mm (inches)	67.3 (2.65)	62.6 (2.46)	46.4 (1.83)	37.5 (1.48)	23.9 (0.94)	15.5 (0.61)	9.1 (0.36)	15.3 (0.60)	66.1 (2.60)	89.0 (3.50)	116.7 (4.59)	77.9 (3.07)	627.2 (24.69)
Average precipitation days (≥ 1.0 mm)	8.3	7.2	6.1	5.1	3.7	1.8	1.0	1.6	5.3	6.8	10.3	8.9	66.1
Average relative humidity (%)	79.5	78.2	79.1	79.7	78.8	77.6	77.2	77.9	78.6	80.2	80.3	78.9	78.8
Average dew point °C (°F)	7.3 (45.1)	6.6 (43.9)	8.4 (47.1)	10.9 (51.6)	14.6 (58.3)	18.5 (65.3)	21.0 (69.8)	21.8 (71.2)	18.6 (65.5)	15.4 (59.7)	11.8 (53.2)	8.3 (46.9)	13.6 (56.5)
Source 1: NOAA all-time extreme temperature
Source 2: Temperature estreme in Toscana

== Archaeology ==
The island is famed for its Blue Grottoes, which were created by the Etruscans. Among them are Serpents Grotto and the Roman Gallery, a Roman tunnel that connects the town of Ponza to the (now closed) large sandy beach called Chiaia di Luna on the west side. The island has many archeological ruins visible everywhere, including Greek, and Phoenician necropoli ruins in the middle of the island. There are Etruscan ruins on parts of the island jumbled with Roman ruins. A large statue called Il Mamozio ("The Mummy") or Il Mitreo, meaning miter or priest's hat, is a 3,000-year-old marble statue and was found in the harbor. Depicting a local Etrurian consul, it is now displayed in a museum in Naples behind protective plastic, where it was reunited with its head. It is the oldest known Etruscan statue of its kind and extremely rare.

== Economy ==
The town of Ponza is a fishing and boating port with several large docks that can accommodate large ships. Its biggest industry is tourism followed by boatbuilding, boat repair and fishing.

The four mines at the northern end — the most beautiful area of the island — were closed down in 1975 by the Italian Environmental Protection Agency because the mining operation was destroying the wildlife and flora, which are endangered species. The mines produced kaolin and Bentonite. Kaolin is used in making Kaolin-Pectin medicine and the manufacture of porcelain.

Ponza has a two lane road that goes from north to south, but can accommodate small cars only. An airstrip planned for the north of the island was canceled due to environmental concerns. Because there is no airstrip, seaplanes visit the island instead.

Celebrities who have vacationed on Ponza include Kirk Douglas, his son Michael Douglas, Anthony Quinn, Burt Lancaster, Gina Lollobrigida, Elsa Martinelli and Sophia Loren, Jacques Cousteau and his son, Philippe Cousteau, who filmed several documentaries in the area.

Federico Fellini's Satyricon (1969) was filmed on Ponza. Some scenes in Wes Anderson's film The Life Aquatic were filmed on the island; Ponza was instead called in the movie, "Port-au-Patois".

The Rai Fiction television series, "Un'altra Vita" (2014), was largely filmed on Ponza. Many of the scenes showcase the hilly landscape and rugged shoreline of the island.

Most of the people who live there raise rabbits and chickens and other animals in coops for meat to make cacciatore. Other farmed animals include goats, lamb and pigeons.

Many of the original inhabitants of Ponza are now leaving the island. They are steadily being replaced by other Italians from the mainland. Many local children simply move away after becoming adults and never return.

The local economy is in a downturn partly due to the severe restrictions on commercial fishing.

== Transportation ==
Ferries reach Ponza from Naples, Terracina, Formia and Anzio; there are also hydrofoils (aliscafo) from Anzio and Formia that take about 75 minutes. The ferries and hydrofoils may not depart to and from Ponza during severe weather conditions. Much of Ponza is accessible by car and a bus runs the length of the island.

== Main sights ==
- Giardino Botanico Ponziano "Ponza's Botanical Garden"
- Capo Bianco "Cape White" Italian National Natural Monument
- Spiaggia di Chaia di Luna ("Moon Gravel Beach")
- Grotta della Maga Circe ("Cave of the Sorceress Circe")
- Grotta di Ulisse o del Sangue "Cave of Ulysses (Odysseus) of the Blood"
- Monte Guardia ("Watchout Hill"), Ponza's tallest hill
- Arco Naturale o Spaccapolpi, a natural arch standing in deep water looks like giant pants
- Grotta Azzurra, a sea cave complex
- Spiaggia delle Felci, a beach
- Grotta di Serpent an underground maze of tunnels built by the Romans, much of it blocked off for safety reasons.
- Grotte di Pilato, built by the Romans.
- Spiaggia Di Le Forna, a smaller and tourist beach.
- natural saltwater swimming pool in Le Forna.
- Faraglioni di Lucia Rosa (Rocky shoals) named in honor of Lucia Rosa
- Spiaggia di Frontone, a beach
- Spiaggia di Santa Maria, a beach
- Cala Fonte Natural fisherman's harbor, swimming on the north side is interesting.
- Bue marino cave a cave where the seals were used to find cover.
- cala Gaetano Beautiful sea colors, nice variety of fish during the spring time are visible.
- La Caletta Also called the sunset coast where is possible to admire some beautiful sunsets.
- Santi Silverio e Domitilla, Ponza, the island's parish church
- Forte Papa An ancient fortress used to defend the island from Saracens attacks from the sea.

== Feasts ==
- June 20 feast of St Silverius
- August 15 feast of the Assumption of Mary

== See also ==
- List of islands of Italy
