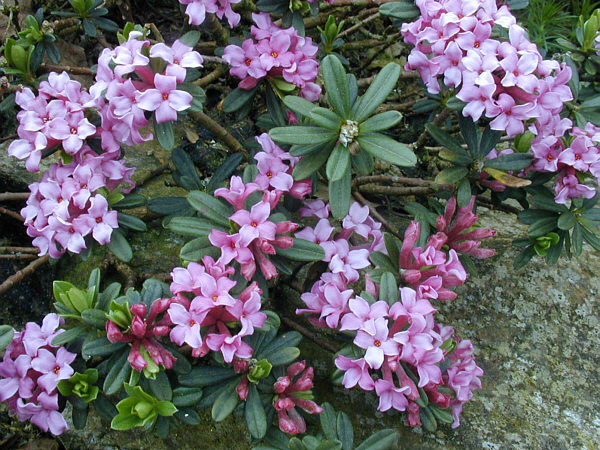

Scientific classification
- Kingdom: Plantae
- Clade: Tracheophytes
- Clade: Angiosperms
- Clade: Eudicots
- Clade: Rosids
- Order: Malvales
- Family: Thymelaeaceae
- Genus: Daphne
- Species: D. sericea

Binomial name
- Daphne sericea Vahl

Synonyms
- Daphne aurea Poir.; Daphne australis Cirillo; Daphne blagayana Meisn.; Daphne buxifolia Ledeb.; Daphne collina Sm. ex Dicks.; Daphne oleifolia Lam.; Daphne vahlii Keissl.

= Daphne sericea =

Species of plant

Daphne sericea is a shrubby species of flowering plant in the genus Daphne with purple flowers. It was first described by Martin Vahl. Daphne collina has been treated as a separate species, but is considered to be a cultivar or group of cultivars of D. sericea. It is a parent, with Daphne caucasica, of the popular hybrid garden plant Daphne × transatlantica.

== Description ==
Daphne sericea usually grows as a shrub to a height of 30 to 40 cm, but can sometimes grow taller. Its leaves are 2 to 4 cm in length. Fragrant purple flowers are produced in late spring to early summer in clusters of 5 to 15. Each flower is around 8 mm long. Fertilized flowers produce fleshy fruits, orange-red to orange-brown in colour. Forms from southern Italy have been called Daphne collina, Daphne sericea 'Collina' and Daphne sericea Collina Group. They are more compact than forms from other parts of the species' range, but otherwise similar.

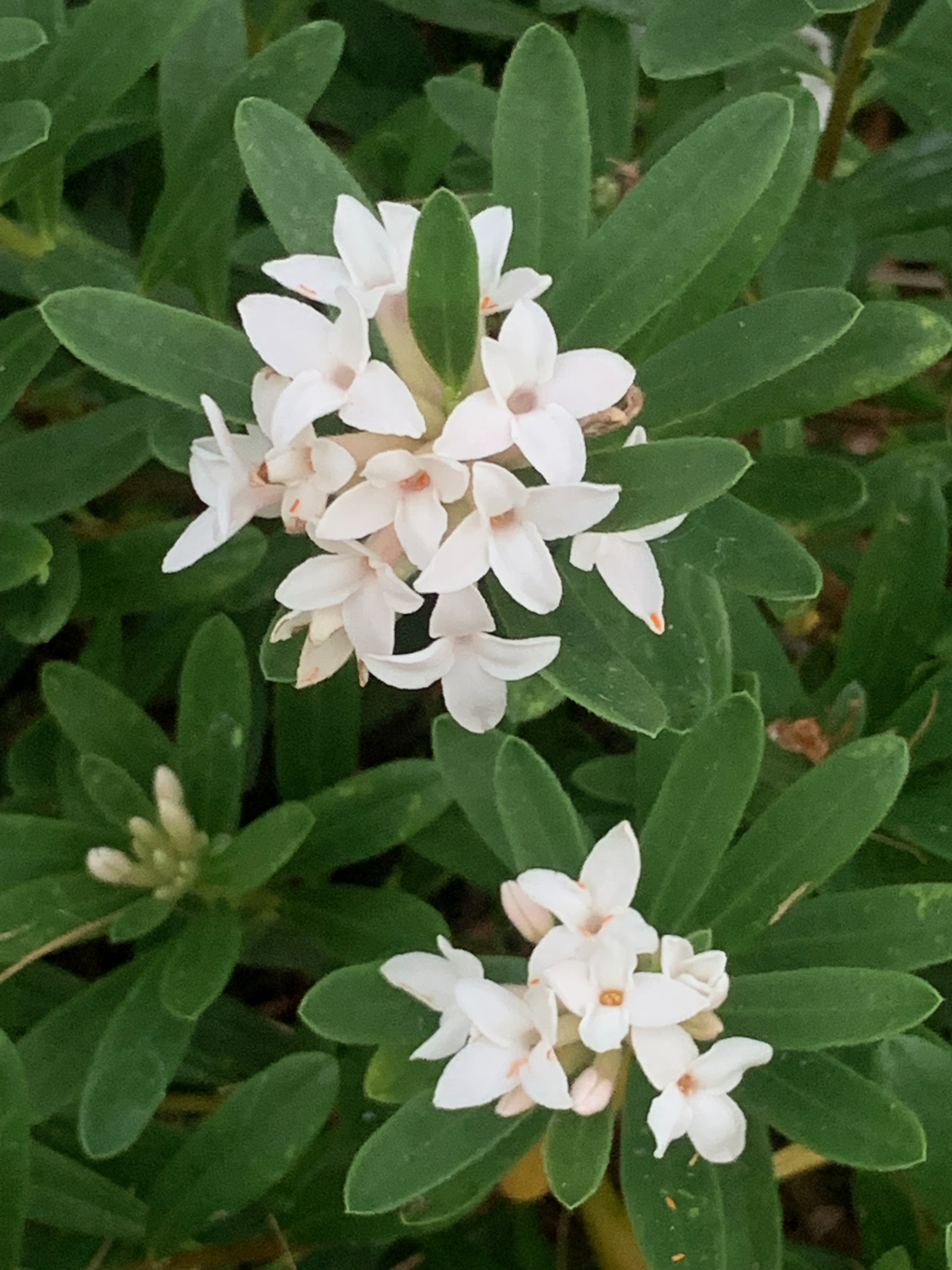
Daphne × transatlantica 'Eternal Fragrance' = 'Blafra'

== Taxonomy ==
Daphne sericea was first described by Martin Vahl in 1790. It was subsequently described under a number of different names that are now considered to be synonyms, including Daphne collina. Daphne pseudosericea has been treated as a subspecies, but as of October 2025 is accepted by Plants of the World Online as a separate species.

== Distribution and habitat ==
Daphne sericea is found in southern Italy, Sicily, Crete, Syria and the Caucasus. It typically grows on rocky slopes and in open pinewoods, at elevations up to 1800 m.
