= Gyaros =

Unpopulated island in the Cyclades, Greece

Native name: Γυάρος or Γιούρα
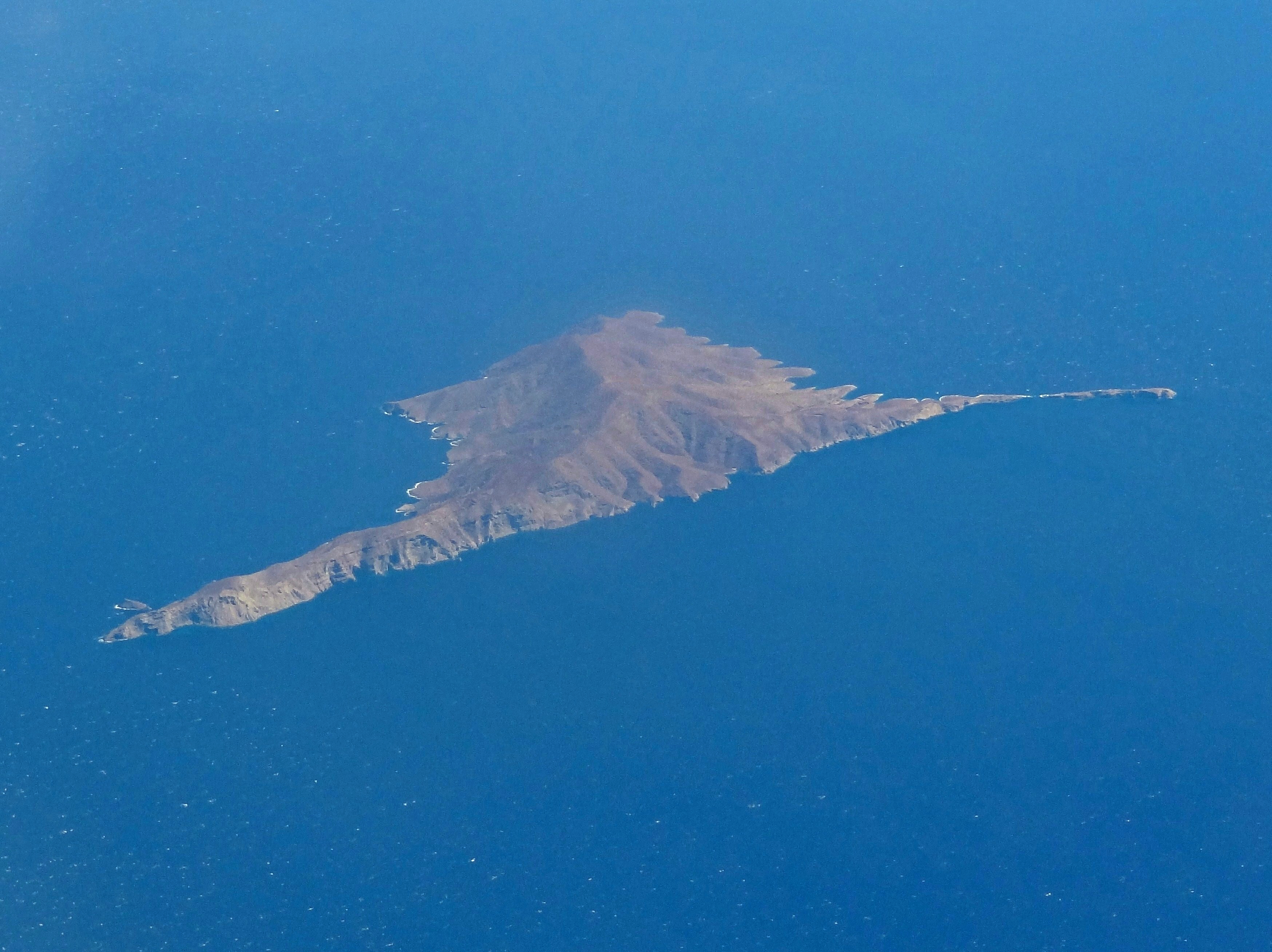

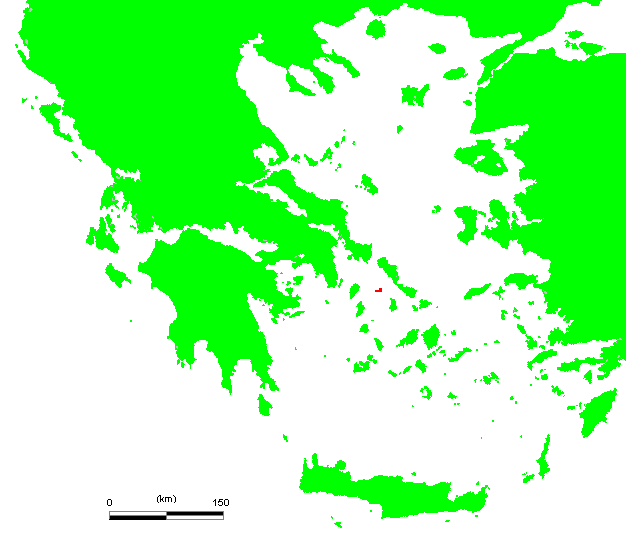

Geography
- Coordinates: 37°37′38″N 24°43′12″E
- Archipelago: Cyclades
- Area: 23 km^{2} (8.9 sq mi)
- Highest elevation: 489 m (1604 ft)
- Highest point: Mt. Gyaros

Administration
- Greece
- Region: Southern Aegean
- Regional unit: Syros

Demographics
- Population: 0 (2001)

Additional information
- Postal code: 840 00
- Area code: 228x0
- Vehicle registration: EM

Gyaros (Greek: Γυάρος pronounced [ˈʝaros]), also locally known as Gioura (Greek: Γιούρα), is an arid and uninhabited Greek island in the northern Cyclades near the islands of Andros and Tinos, with an area of 23 square kilometres (9 sq mi). It is a part of the municipality of Ano Syros, which lies primarily on the island of Syros. This and other small islands of the Aegean Sea served as places of exile for important people in the early Roman Empire. The extremity of its desolation was proverbial among Roman authors, such as Tacitus and Juvenal. The island operated as a prison island and concentration camp for left-wing political dissidents in Greece from 1948 until 1974. During that time, at least 22,000 people were exiled or imprisoned on the island. It is an island of great ecological importance as it hosts the largest population of monk seals in the Mediterranean.

== Mythology and early history ==
The pseudo-Aristotelian work On Marvellous Things Heard (25) recounts the tale that on Gyaros the mice eat iron.

In the Aeneid of Virgil, Gyaros and Mykonos are said to be the two islands to which the god Apollo tied the holy island of Delos to stop its wandering over the Aegean Sea. In his recounting of the myth of the war between Minos and Aegeus, the king of Athens, the poet Ovid speaks of Gyaros as one island that refused to join the campaign of the Cretan king.

In 29 BC, the historian and geographer Strabo had an extended stay on the island, on his way to Corinth.

In the 1st century AD, Pliny the Elder wrote in his Natural History that the island, which had a city, was 15 miles (24 km) in circumference and lay 62 miles (100 km) from Andros. He also records that the inhabitants of Gyaros were once put to flight by (a plague of) mice. The island is also mentioned by the Roman orator Cicero, and other notable Latin authors, indicating a broad awareness of Gyaros among the educated elite of the 1st century BC to the 2nd century AD.

== Exile island during the early Roman Empire ==
The island (Latin: Gyaros or Gyara) also served as a place of exile during the early Roman Empire. Writing in the early 2nd century AD, the Roman historian Tacitus records that, when Silanus, the proconsul of the province of Asia, was accused of extortion and treason, and it had been proposed in the Roman Senate that he be exiled to Gyaros, the Roman Emperor Tiberius allowed him to be sent to the nearby island of Kythnos instead, since Gyaros was "harsh and devoid of human culture" (Annales 3.68-69). When confronted with another recommendation to exile a defendant to Gyaros, Tiberius once more declined, noting that the island was deficient in water, and that those granted their lives ought to be granted the means to live (4.30). The defendant was allowed to go into exile on Amorgos instead. The Roman poet Juvenal, a near-contemporary of Tacitus, mentions this island twice in his Satires: first as a place of exile for particularly vile criminals (1.73), and second as a symbol of claustrophobic imprisonment (10.170). In the second reference, Juvenal compares the restlessness of Alexander the Great to that of a man imprisoned:

One globe was not enough for the youth from Pella,
He seethed within the narrow confines of the world,
as if he were hemmed in by the cliffs of Gyara or by tiny Seriphos.

unus Pellaeo iuueni non sufficit orbis,
aestuat infelix angusto limite mundi
ut Gyarae clausus scopulis paruaque Seripho;
(1.168-70)

Under emperor Nero, the philosopher Musonius Rufus was found guilty for his participation in the Pisonian conspiracy and was banished to Gyara.

== Exile on the island during the 20th century ==
A red brick prison building held approximately 10,000 inmates between 1948 and 1953 for their participation in Ethniko Apeleftherotiko Metopo (EAM) or for their involvement in the Greek Civil War (1945–1949). Jehovah's Witnesses were also sentenced to exile on the island as Christian conscientious objectors.

The prison was used again by the Greek military junta during the years 1967 to 1974.

The structures on the island are decaying due to weathering and lack of maintenance. In four separate sites north of the prison building are also the ruins of camps where prisoners lived in tents, both summer and winter. Once a year, the men and women who are alive and in good health (most of them were born between the 1910s and 1930s) and who were formerly imprisoned on the island for their political views pay tribute by visiting the island and holding a ceremony in the cemetery of those who died on the island.

The Greek government used the island as a target range for the Hellenic Navy until the year 2000. The island is currently off-limits to the general public except during commemorative events and approaching or fishing in close proximity is forbidden by the Hellenic Coast Guard.

== Ecology and conservation ==
After Greece stopped using the island as a target range, Gyaros became an important wildlife refuge in the Aegean Sea. The island and its surrounding waters became one of the largest breeding populations of the Mediterranean Monks Seal, that has become one of the world's rarest mammals. The island's location along with the absence of permanent human settlement have made it a safe haven for the species. In 2011 the waters around Gyaros were designated a marine protected area under the Natura 2000 network. This was followed by fishing restrictions and monitoring the Monk Seal population. The island has also become an important habitat for seabirds, most notable the Yelkouan shearwater.
