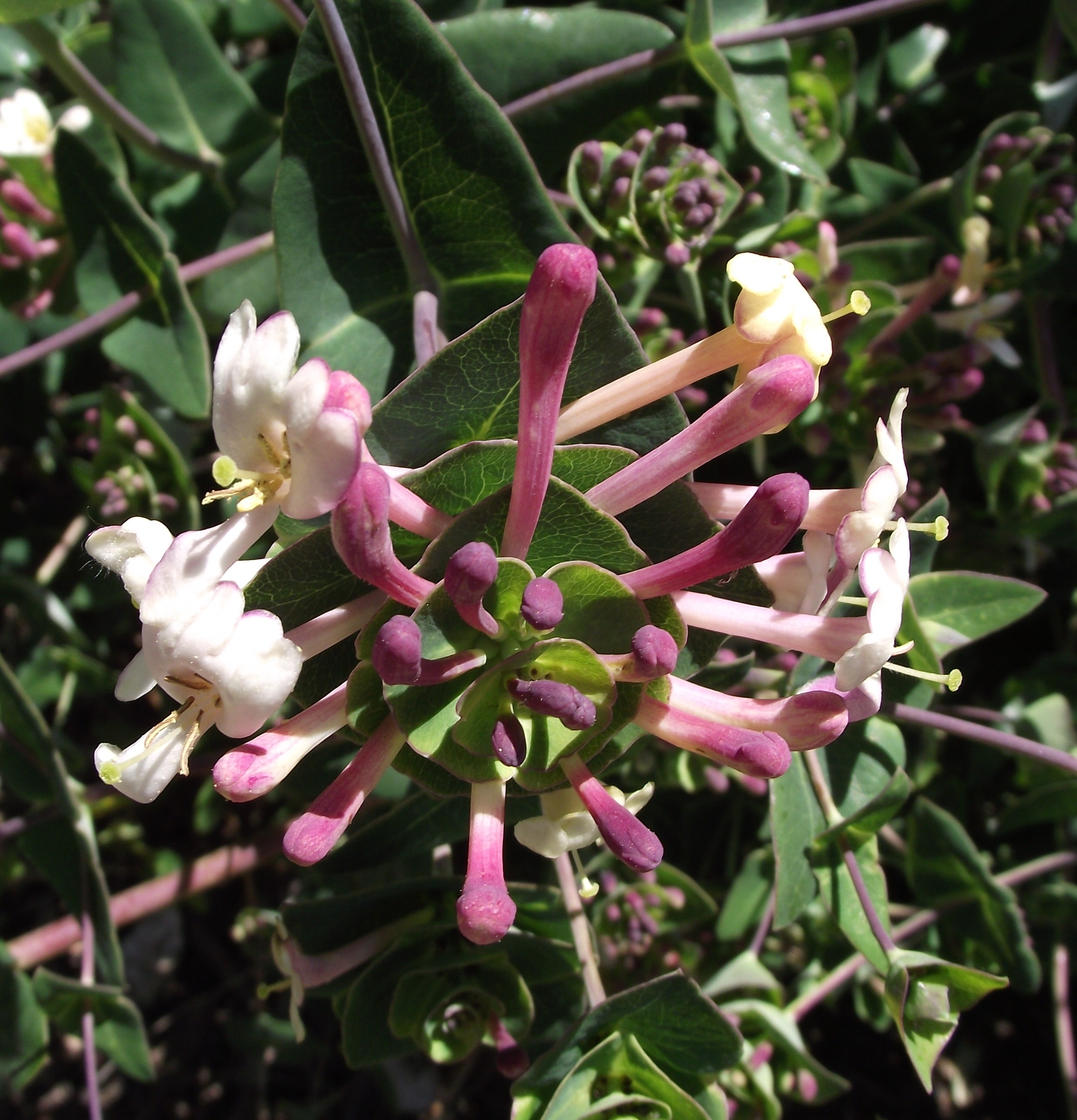

Scientific classification
- Kingdom: Plantae
- Clade: Tracheophytes
- Clade: Angiosperms
- Clade: Eudicots
- Clade: Asterids
- Order: Dipsacales
- Family: Caprifoliaceae
- Genus: Lonicera
- Species: L. implexa

Binomial name
- Lonicera implexa Soland.

= Lonicera implexa =

Species of plant

Lonicera implexa, sometimes known by the common but nonspecific names Minorca, evergreen or Mediterranean honeysuckle, is a species of flowering plants in the Caprifoliaceae family. As with most Lonicera (honeysuckle) species, L. implexa is a climbing plant growing to 2.5 m or more.

Lonicera implexa is native to the Mediterranean region. In southern Europe, it can be found along the entire European Mediterranean region, with its native range includes Portugal and Spain (including the Balearic islands), southern France (including Corsica), Italy (including Sardinia and Sicily), Malta, Western Balkans, Greece (including East Aegean islands) and the European part of Turkey (East Thrace). In northern Africa, its range is limited to the Mediterranean region of Morocco, Algeria and Tunisia.

Lonicera implexa is sometimes cultivated as a garden plant outside of its native range, having been first introduced to the United Kingdom in 1772.
