= NoviCraft =

2008 video game

- Developer(s): LudoCraft
- Publisher(s): TeamingStream
- Engine: Unreal Engine 2
- Platform(s): Microsoft Windows
- Release: 2008
- Genre(s): Serious game
- Mode(s): Multiplayer

NoviCraft is a 2008 video game developed by LudoCraft Ltd. and published by TeamingStream Ltd. It is a resource which aims to support business customers in social excellence, and learn to construct shared understanding with different people in changing contexts. It is a total conversion mod for virtual engagement which was commercially released in 2008. The game's first generation was developed in 2002 for research purposes at the University of Oulu, Finland to test whether computer games could be used for learning. In 2009, NoviCraft was granted the "best e-learning solution of the year" award during a competition hosted by Finland's E-learning Center (E-oppimiskeskus).

== Background ==
NoviCraft is a serious 3D video game using Unreal Engine 2 that tasks teams with solving problems cooperatively through a virtual adventure which takes place on a prison island. The problems presented to the teams are designed to require coordinated activity and discussion in order to succeed. NoviCraft seeks to improve players' social skills, such as:

- Communication
- Leading and building of psychological safety, giving and receiving help
- Coordination, and goal orientation
- Think-aloud; Sharing existing knowledge
- Challenges with working in distributed virtual teams, strategy creation, and risk taking
- Planning work and executing tasks according to a plan

The game's design goal is to give the team a collaborative learning experience of a shared distributed problem-solving situation. The tasks in NoviCraft have been scripted based on several years of scientific research to promote equal participation from all participants. The tasks are built to launch key mechanisms of collaborative learning, such as asking questions, helping others, explaining and listening.

== Game procedure ==
=== Setting and introduction ===
Discussions are held concerning the game's participants, goals, and the game's procedure and schedule.

=== Pre-play questionnaire ===
Participants fill in the pre-questionnaire concerning their team skills, current situation, and skills or situations that could use improvement.

=== Gameplay commences ===
The game is designed for players inexperienced with video games, to be completed in a play time of 4–5 hours. In the game, each participant is represented by a customizable avatar figure, and may communicate with teammates through headphones and microphones via TeamSpeak. The participants' communications and play-performance can be monitored for more detailed analysis and recommendations for further development.

NoviCraft's premise centers around an escape story, where each team has to flee from a prison island by solving five interactive puzzles together. First, a short frame story appears on the computer screen before the tutorial field. In the story, participants are told that they are prisoners being held on an island, and one of the senior prisoners knows possible ways to escape. If they follow the instructions of the senior prisoner as a team, then they can have a chance to escape.

The participants are then placed in a tutorial area to practice the basic functionalities of their avatars for five minutes. Before the game, the participants are also told to collaborate in order to solve the puzzles in the game. Lastly, each player receives different instructions called "parchments" (virtual papers with some instructions for one of the tasks).

Once the game fully begins, participants have to accomplish five tasks that appear in a set order. After each task that they manage to achieve, a gate to a new area opens. The structuring of the game-world is designed as linear to minimize confusion and time spent not solving puzzles. The tasks in The Gate specifically are as follows:

1. Each team member has to pass a gas field in a barrel with the help of others' instructions.
2. Members have to send different colored smoke signals in a certain order.
3. Members have to prepare an oil mixture from ingredients given to them.
4. The team is split into two pairs who have to pass through a field while building fences to ward off angry dogs.
5. With the burner oil and tools gathered from the earlier tasks, the team has to build a balloon to escape from the prison island.

=== Post-play reflection ===
At the end of the game, each participant fills in a brief questionnaire as an individual to reflect on their gameplay experience. The answers are collected together in-game and compiled into a post-play report. After these personal reflections, the NoviCraft facilitator guides the team through a shared reflection concerning the game activities. This reflection, carried out through group discussion, is at first based on the game, but expands to everyday, work-related situations towards the end.

About one week after the game's conclusion, participants fill in another feedback-questionnaire concerning NoviCraft to again reflect on their gameplay experience.
