= Law firms of the Netherlands =

Top Dutch law firms' stats

In 2019, the top 50 Dutch law firms (Dutch: advocatenkantoren) had around 4,476 attorneys (Dutch: advocaten) and the top 30 law firms had around 183 notaries (Dutch: notarissen) and 527 candidate notaries. According to the Chambers and Partners legal directory, the top five law firms in the Netherlands are Allen & Overy Netherlands, De Brauw Blackstone Westbroek, Houthoff, Loyens & Loeff and Stibbe. Every year advocatie.nl publishes a list of the 50 biggest law firms in headcount.

== Structure ==
Bigger law firms in the Netherlands are often organised as a partnership, private limited liability company (B.V. or Dutch: besloten vennootschap), public company (N.V. or Dutch: naamloze vennootschap)) or cooperative. It is common for a law firm to have notaries attached to it. Smaller law firms sometimes opt for a maatschap, where all lawyers run their own offices, but share the costs of rent, employees and marketing.

Law firms of the Netherlands
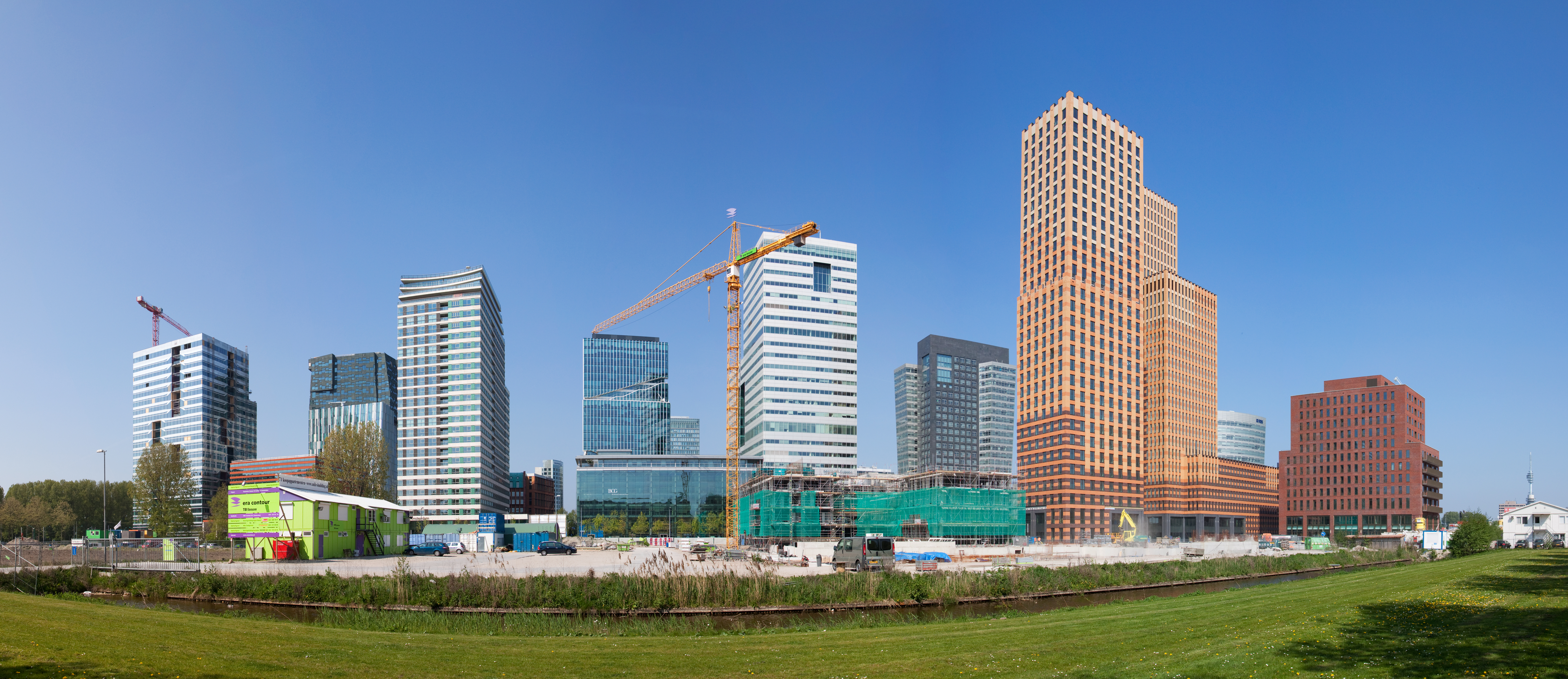
The majority of Dutch law firms have their head offices in the Zuidas business district in Amsterdam.

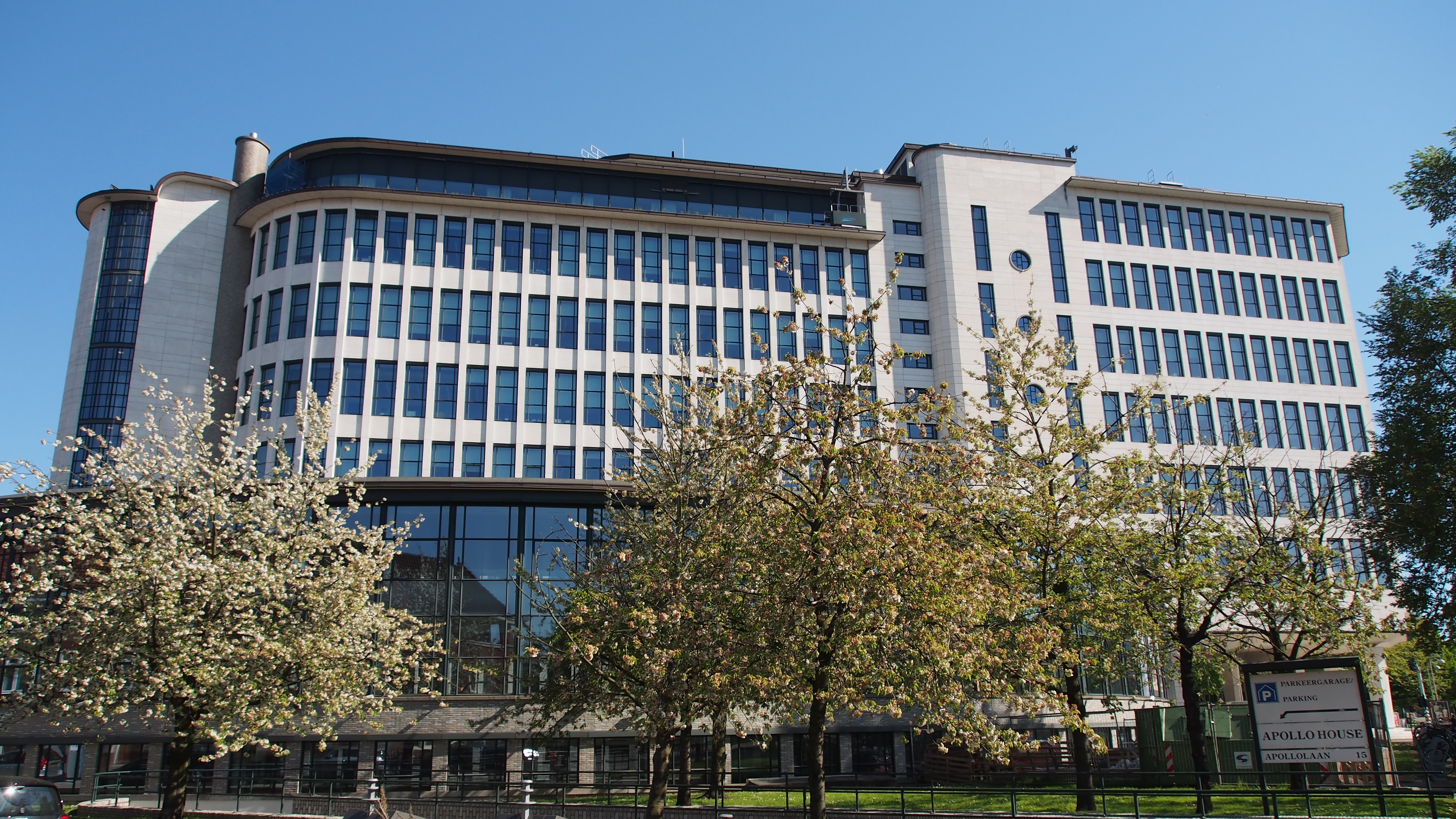
Allen & Overy Netherlands's office in Apollo House, Apollobuurt, Amsterdam. Apollo House is a Dutch national monument (Dutch: rijksmonument).

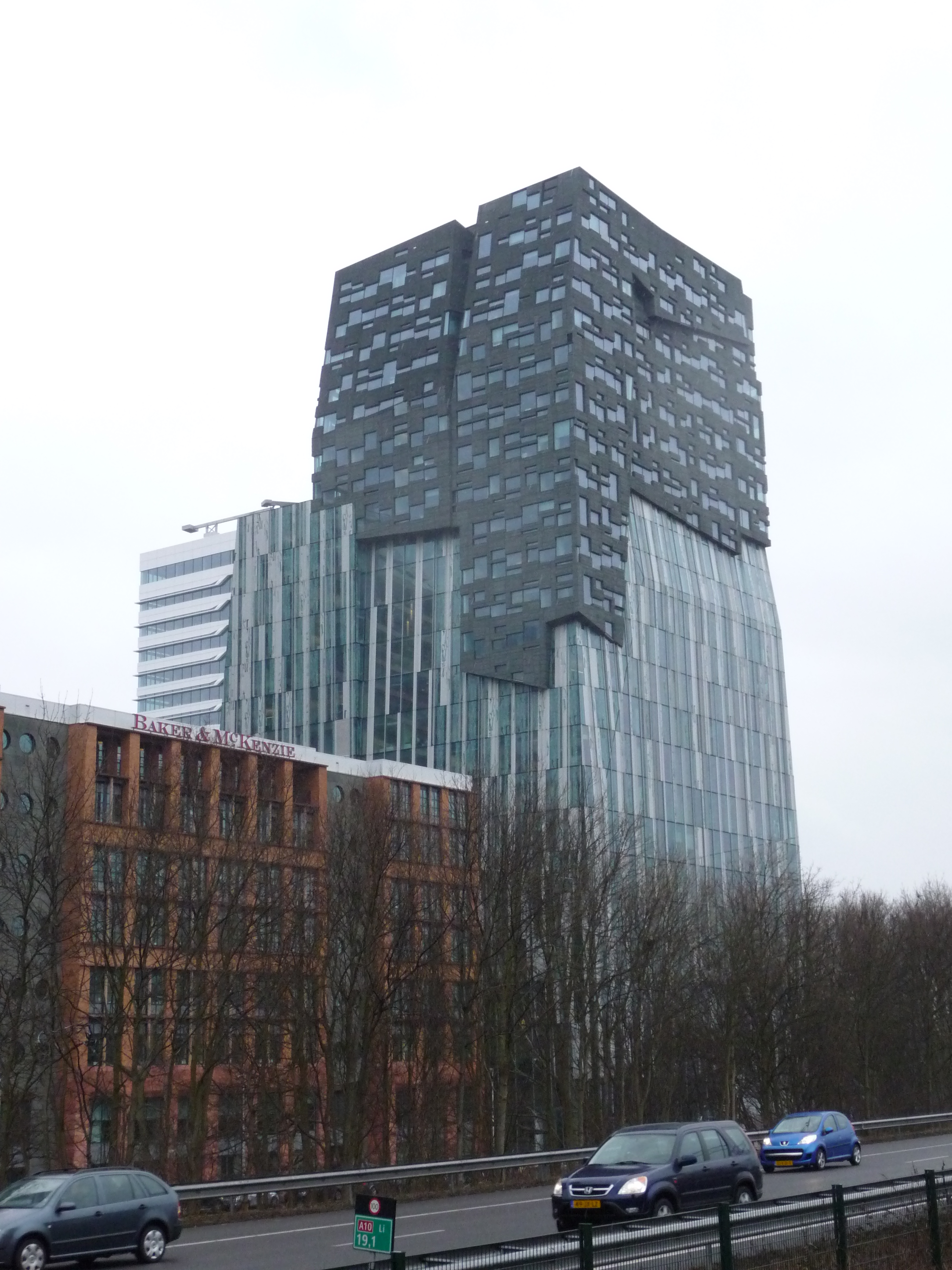
De Brauw Blackstone Westbroek's office in The Rock, Zuidas, Amsterdam.

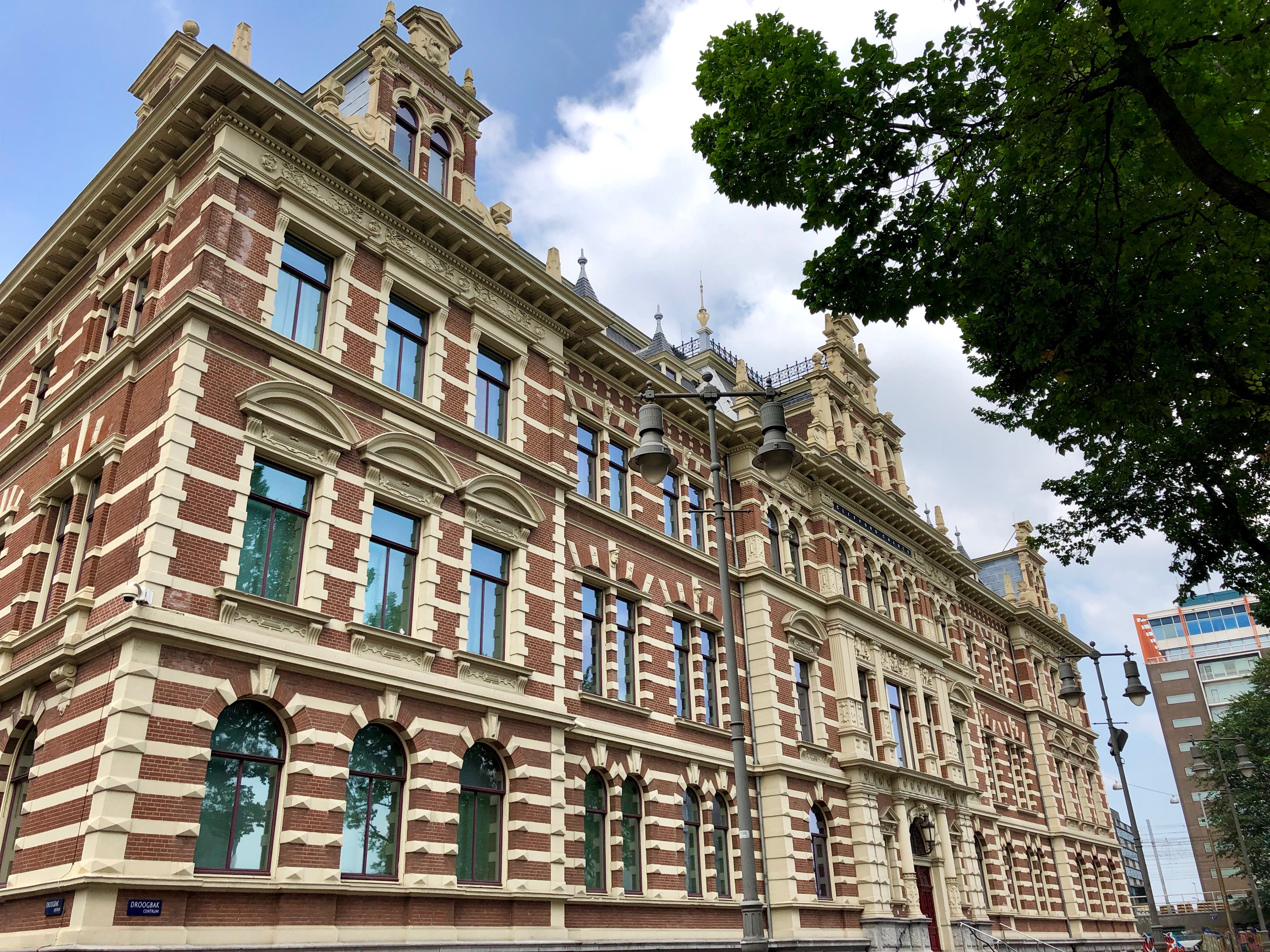
Clifford Chance Netherlands's office in Haarlemmerbuurt, Amsterdam.

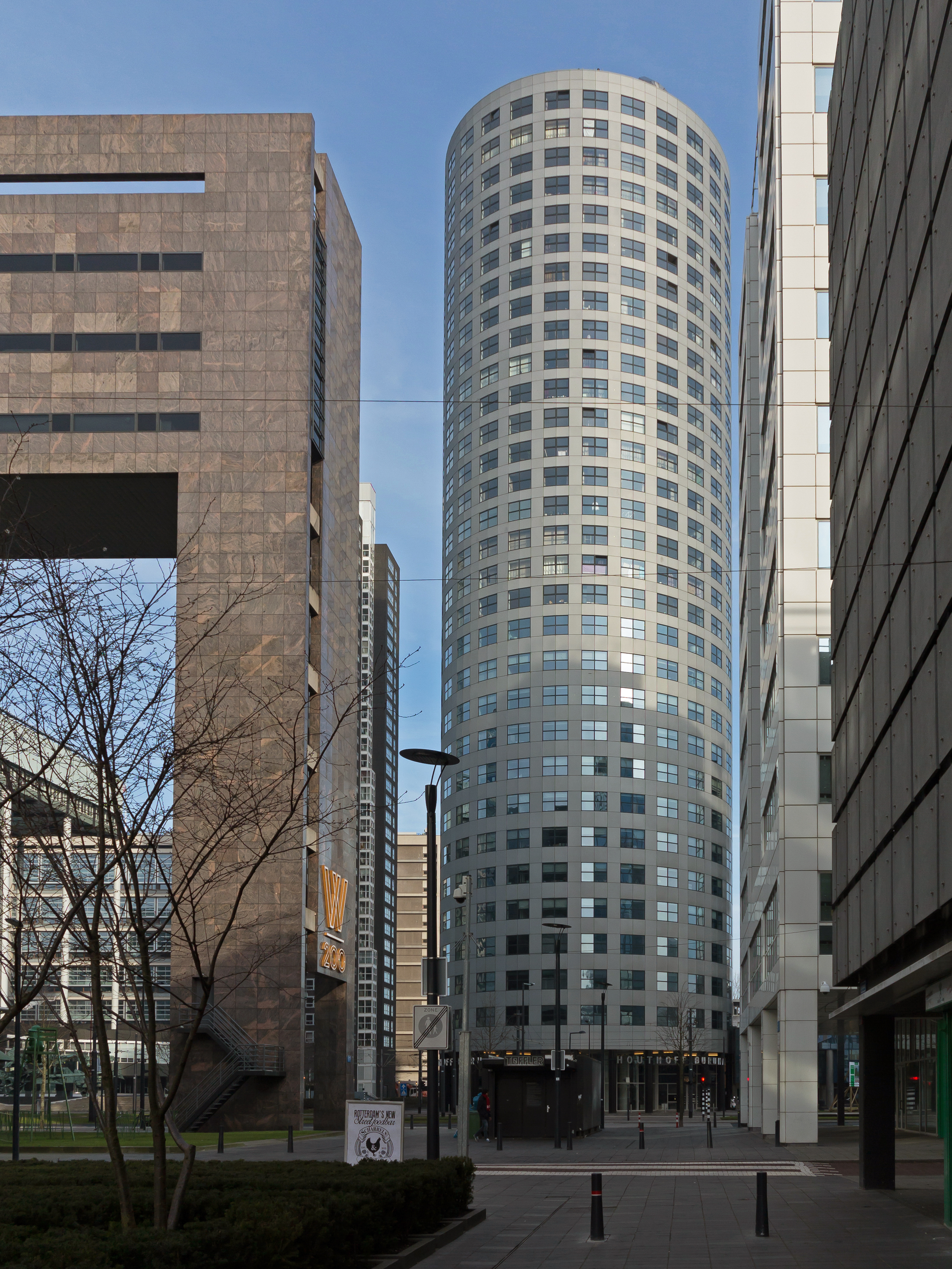
Houthoff's office in Rotterdam.

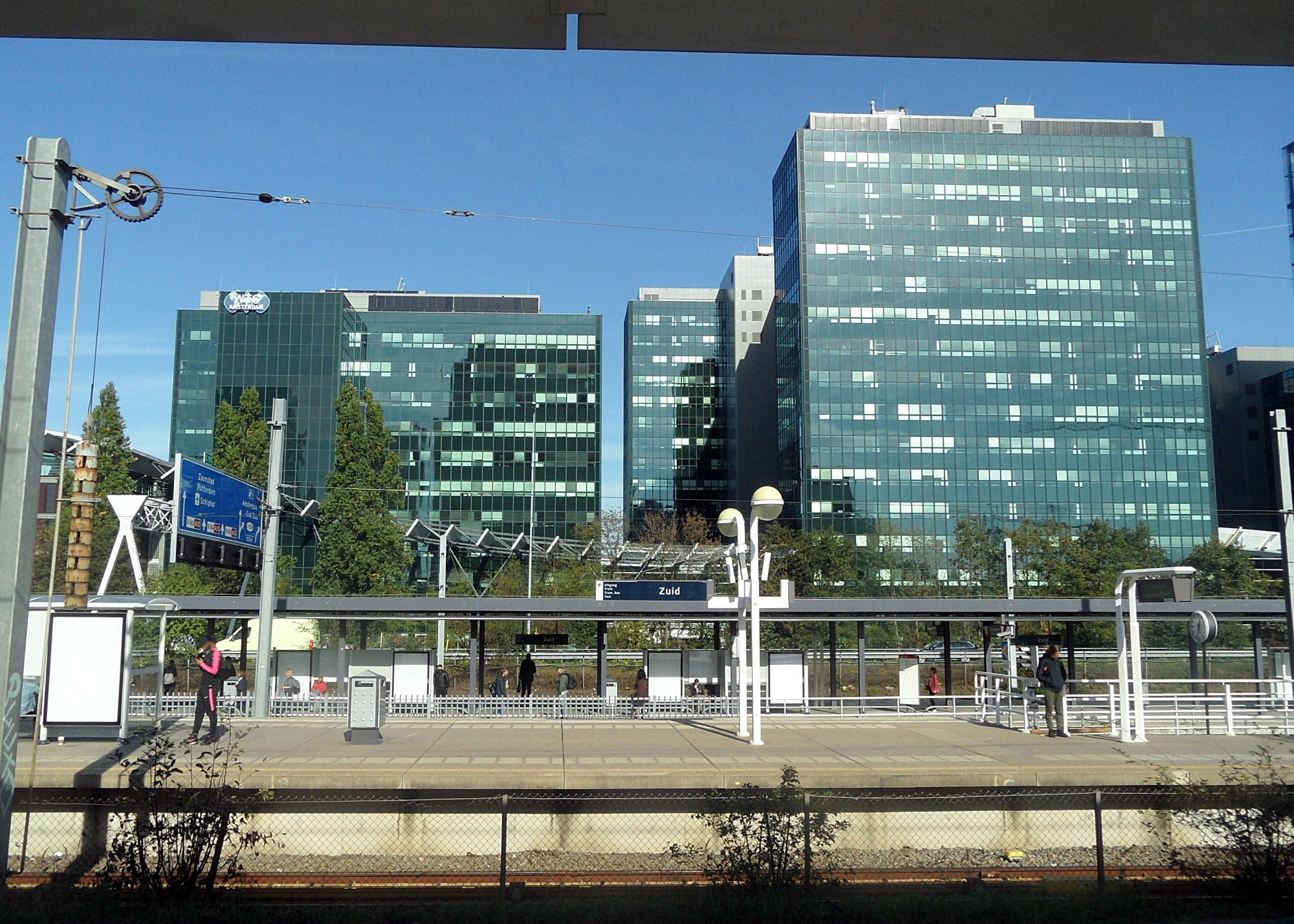
Linklaters Netherlands's office in the World Trade Center (Amsterdam), Zuidas, Amsterdam.

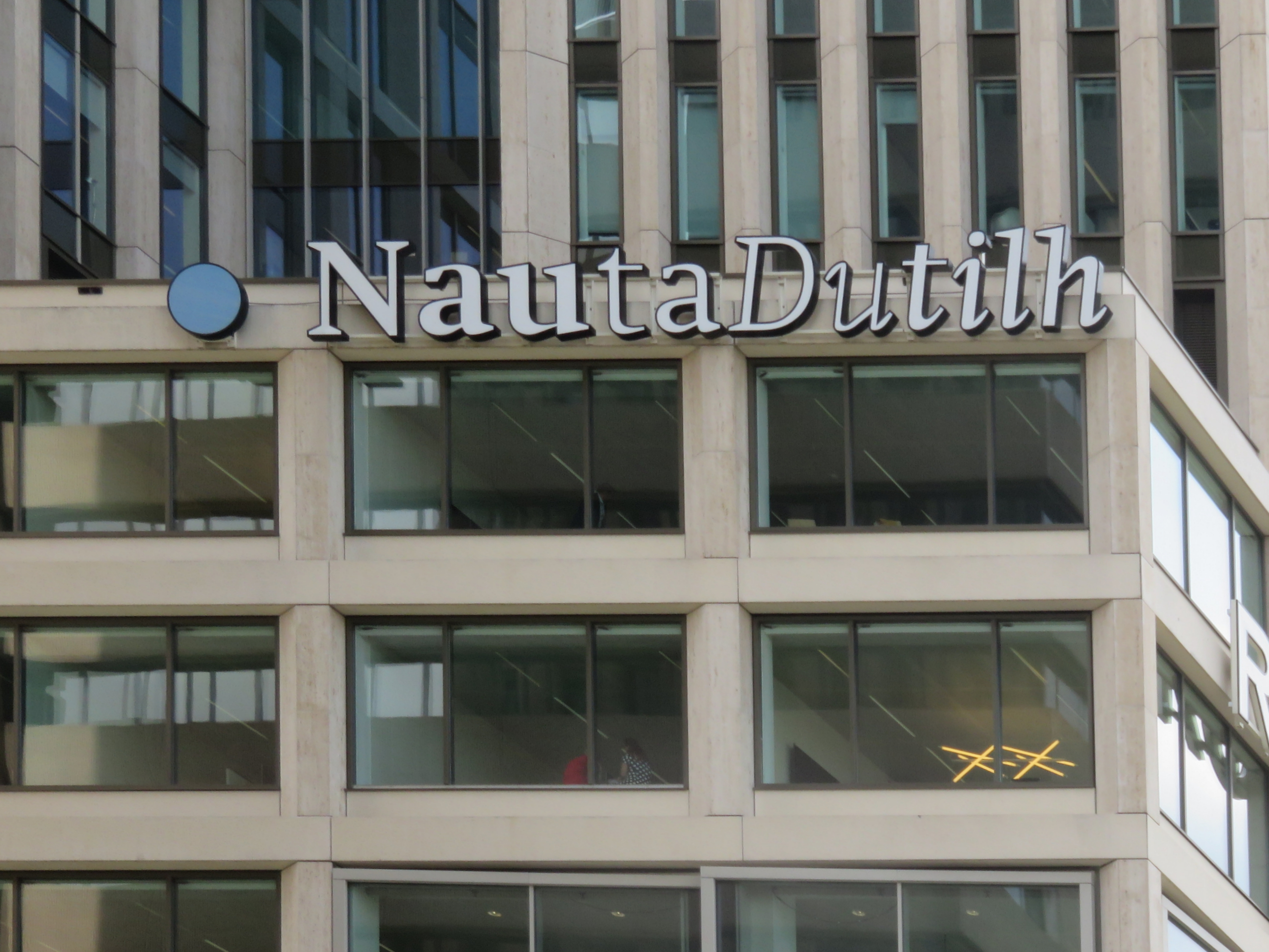
NautaDutilh's office in Rotterdam.

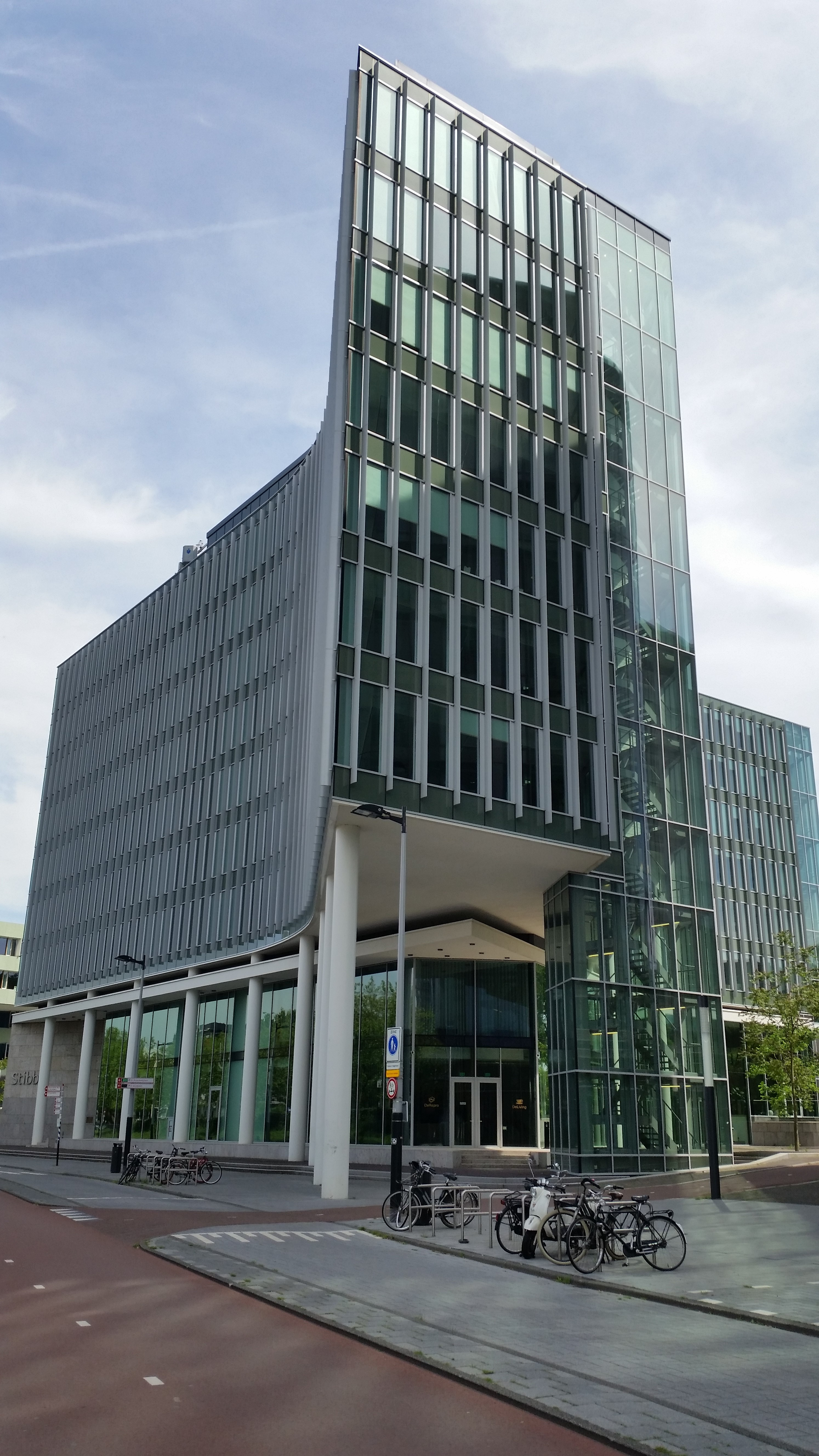
Stibbe's office in Zuidas, Amsterdam.

== Largest Law Firms ==
=== Attorneys ===
A list of law firms (in alphabetical order) with more than 100 attorneys in the Netherlands in 2020 is set out below.

Name	Date Founded	Attorneys	Revenue (€ million)^{(Note 1)}
AKD	1903	196	84,19
Allen & Overy Netherlands^{(Note 2)}	1854^{(Note 3)}	169	^{(Note 4)}
De Brauw Blackstone Westbroek^{(Note 5)}	1871	298	167,70
Dirkzwager		104	41,76
DLA Piper Netherlands		115	55,22
Clifford Chance Netherlands	1972	126	^{(Note 6)}
CMS Netherlands		115	46,99
Houthoff		245	123,80
EY HVG Law		124	45,01^{(Note 7)}
Kennedy Van der Laan	2006	102	26,23
Loyens & Loeff^{(Note 2)}	2000	255	343,90
NautaDutilh	1724	266	175,20
Pels Rijcken & Droogleever Fortuijn	1969	151	54,63
Stibbe^{(Note 8)}	1911	193	101,21
Van Doorne	1930	153	59,06

Notes:

- 2019/2020, including notarial revenue.
- In 1991, Benelux law firm, Loeff Claeys Verbeke, formed a tripartite alliance with Magic Circle law firm Allen & Overy and French law firm Gide Loyrette Nouel. Allen & Overy and Gide Loyrette Nouel terminated their alliance in 1998. After it was unable to agree on a full merger with Allen & Overy, in 2000, a third of the Amsterdam, Brussels and Luxembourg offices of Loeff Claeys Verbeke merged with Allen & Overy to form Allen & Overy Belgium, Luxembourg and Netherlands, a third merged with tax advisers Loyens & Volkmaars to form Loyens & Loeff and a third left the firm. At its height, Loeff Claeys Verbeke had more than 500 attorneys and notaries.
- Allen & Overy was founded in the City of London on 1 January 1930.
- Allen & Overy does not separately report its revenue for the Netherlands. In its 2019/20 financial year, it had global revenue of £1,69 billion.
- In 1998. De Brauw Blackstone Westbroek and three other European law firms entered into an alliance with Linklaters to form Linklaters & Alliance. In 2002, it terminated that alliance, choosing not to merge with Linklaters. It has since entered into a "best friends" alliance with BonelliErede (Italy), Bredin Prat (France), Hengeler Mueller (Germany), Slaughter and May (UK) and Uría Menéndez (Spain).
- Clifford Chance does not separately report its revenue for the Netherlands. In its 2019/2020 financial year, it had global revenue of £1,8 billion.
- 2018/2019.
- In 2002, Silver Circle law firm Herbert Smith (now Herbert Smith Freehills) (UK), Gleiss Lutz (Germany) and Stibbe formed a tripartite alliance. In November 2011, Gleiss Lutz and Stibbe voted against a merger with Herbert Smith. That alliance subsequently ended on 31 December 2011.

=== Notaries ===
A list of law firms (in alphabetical order) with more than 20 notaries and candidate notaries in the Netherlands in 2020 is set out below.

Name	Notaries	Candidate Notaries
Actus Notarissen	11	11
Allen & Overy Netherlands	3	18
Baker McKenzie Netherlands	2	18
Daamen De Kort van Tuijl	10	12
De Brauw Blackstone Westbroek	4	28
Dirkzwager	8	13
Houthoff	5	43
Hermans & Schuttevaer	9	17
Het Notarieel	12	18
Hoekstra & Partners	9	14
Loyens & Loeff	10	61
NautaDutilh	9	39
Trip	5	15
Van Doorne	9	17
VBC Notarissen	6	18

== Rankings ==
Chambers and Partners rankings of the number of speciality areas in each law firm recognised as leading in the Netherlands in 2020. In the Netherlands, Chambers and Partners ranks law firms in bands from 1 (highest) to 4 (lowest). Being ranked in any band is an achievement. This list is non-exhaustive.

Rank	Name	Band 1	Band 2	Band 3	Band 4
1	Allen & Overy Netherlands	12	6	4	1
2	De Brauw Blackstone Westbroek	11	6	2	None
3	Stibbe	8	7	3	1
4	Loyens & Loeff	8	4	3	1
5	Houthoff	7	4	9	None
	NautaDutilh	5	11	3	None
	Clifford Chance Netherlands	4	7	3	1
	AKD	4	2	3	2
	Van Doorne	4	1	4	3
	Pels Rijcken & Droogleever Fortuijn	3	3	1	1
	Stek	2	1	2	1
	Linklaters Netherlands	2	None	2	3
	Freshfields Bruckhaus Deringer Netherlands	1	5	3	2
	DLA Piper Netherlands	1	1	6	1
	Lexence	1	None	2	1
	Simmons & Simmons Netherlands	None	4	1	3
	Jones Day Netherlands	None	3	1	1
	Baker McKenzie Netherlands	None	2	3	1
	CMS Netherlands	None	1	2	3
	deBreij	None	1	None	None
	Kennedy Van der Laan	None	None	None	1
	EY HVG Law	None	None	None	None

== Associate remuneration ==
In 2019, the average gross annual salary for associates at Dutch law firms ranged between:

- €45,000 and €80,000 for one to four years' experience;
- €70,000 and €105,000 for four to seven years' experience; and
- €95,000 and €150,000 for more than seven years' experience.
