= Legal services in the United Kingdom =

The legal services sector of the United Kingdom is a significant part of the national economy; it had a total output of £22.6 billion in 2013, up from 10.6 billion in 2001, and is equivalent to 1.6% of the country's gross domestic product for that year. The sector has a trade surplus is £3.1 billion in 2013 and directly employees 316,000 people, two-thirds of whom are located outside London. The UK is the world's most international market for legal services. It allows virtually unrestricted access for foreign firms, resulting in over 200 foreign law firms with offices in London and other cities in the UK. Around half of these are US firms, with the remainder mainly from Europe, Australia and Canada. The UK legal market has a strong global position due to the popularity of English law. Some 27% of the world's 320 legal jurisdictions use English Common law.

London is a major international legal centre and more international and commercial arbitrations take place there than in any other city in the world, with 1,198 claims being issued in the Commercial Court in 2013, of which 80% involved at least one party whose address was outside England and Wales. Five of the world's ten largest law firms by revenues are headquartered in the UK, and three of the largest five Global 100 law firms, based on headcount in 2013 have their main base of operations in the UK. As of 2013 the legal services market in the United Kingdom is experiencing rapid change as a result of forces including market consolidation, globalisation, regulatory change leading to greater corporatisation and the use of new legal structures, and an increasing role of technology. In 2013, gross fees generated by law firms in the UK increased by 8.4% to a record £30.6 billion. This was the strongest growth rate in six years and was supported by the recovery of the UK's financial and business sector, the increase in housing market activity and the strong exports in legal services. A continued recovery in the wider economy and financial markets have led to the forecasting of additional growth in the coming years.

== History ==
By the mid-sixteenth century there were two branches of the legal profession - barristers (in Scotland advocates) and solicitors.

The London Law Institution, the predecessor to The Law Society, was founded in 1823 by a number of London-based solicitors with the aim of raising the reputation of the profession by setting standards and ensuring good practice. 'London' was dropped from the title in 1825 to reflect the fact that the Law Institution had national aspirations.

The first female solicitor was admitted to the British legal profession in 1922.

The merger of City law firms Clifford Turner and Coward Chance in 1987 to form Clifford Chance was the world's largest law firm merger in history at the time it took place, and sparked a wave of consolidation and internationalisation in the European legal services market. Significant mergers between British law firms over the next 15 years included the merger of: Lovell, White & King and Durrant Piesse in 1987; Pinsent & Co and Simpson Curtis in 1995; Nabarro Nathanson and Turner Kenneth Brown in 1995; Dibb Lupton Broomhead and Alsop Wilkinson in 1996; Addleshaw Sons & Latham and Booth & Co. in 1996; McKenna & Co and Cameron Markby Hewitt in 1997; Hammond Suddards and Edge Ellison in 2000; and Pinsent Curtis and Biddle in 2001.

In October 2005 the government announced proposals for a major reform of the legal services sector in England and Wales, including the removal of the powers of the Law Society and the Bar to regulate their members and the creation of a new Legal Services Board.

QualitySolicitors, a grouping of British law firms forming the first national chain of solicitors in the UK, was founded in 2008.

The Great Recession has had a significant impact on the UK legal services sector, causing both large scale job cuts and the collapse of major firms including Manchester-based Halliwells (in 2010), and Manchester-based Cobbetts and Glasgow-based Semple Fraser (both in 2013).

There has been a further wave of large mergers involving UK-based law firms since 2010, including of Lovells and the US-based Hogan & Hartson in May 2010 (forming Hogan Lovells); Barlow Lyde & Gilbert and Clyde & Co in November 2011; Beachcroft and Davies Arnold Cooper in November 2011 (forming DAC Beachcroft); Herbert Smith and the Australia-based Freehills in October 2012 (forming Herbert Smith Freehills); Norton Rose and the US-based Fulbright & Jaworski in June 2013 (forming Norton Rose Fulbright); Ashurst and the Australia-based Blake Dawson in November 2013; and SJ Berwin and the Hong Kong-based King & Wood Mallesons in November 2013. In February 2016, the UK-based law firm Wragge Lawrence Graham & Co merged with the Canada-based firm Gowlings to form Gowling WLG, in the first multinational law firm merger co-led by a Canadian firm.

In October 2011 provisions of the Legal Services Act 2007 came into effect which allowed alternative business structures (ABSs) with non-lawyers in professional, management or ownership roles to offer regulated legal services in England and Wales. Prior to this time, lawyers in England and Wales could only practise as: solicitors, as sole traders or in partnerships with other solicitors; barristers, as sole traders; or employees providing legal services to their employer.

The establishment of the first alternative business structure legal service providers was approved by the Solicitors Regulation Authority in April 2012; Co-operative Legal Services, the Kent-based Lawbridge Solicitors and the Oxford-based John Welch & Stammers were the first firms to be approved.

== Market structure ==
As of July 2010 there were around 11,100 law firms registered in England and Wales. Sole practitioners and partnerships with two or three members together accounted for around 80% of the total number of firms, while those with more than 25 partners accounted for around 2% of firms.

Lawyers in England and Wales are divided between solicitors and barristers, each of which have their own training requirements and customs of practice. Solicitors can be broadly described as general practitioner lawyers who have extensive direct access with clients, and barristers as lawyers who specialise in courtroom advocacy, drafting legal pleadings, and the giving of expert legal opinions.

In 2010/11 around 59% of the UK legal sector's revenues were generated by solicitors, around 8% by barristers and around 33% by other service providers.

=== City law firms ===
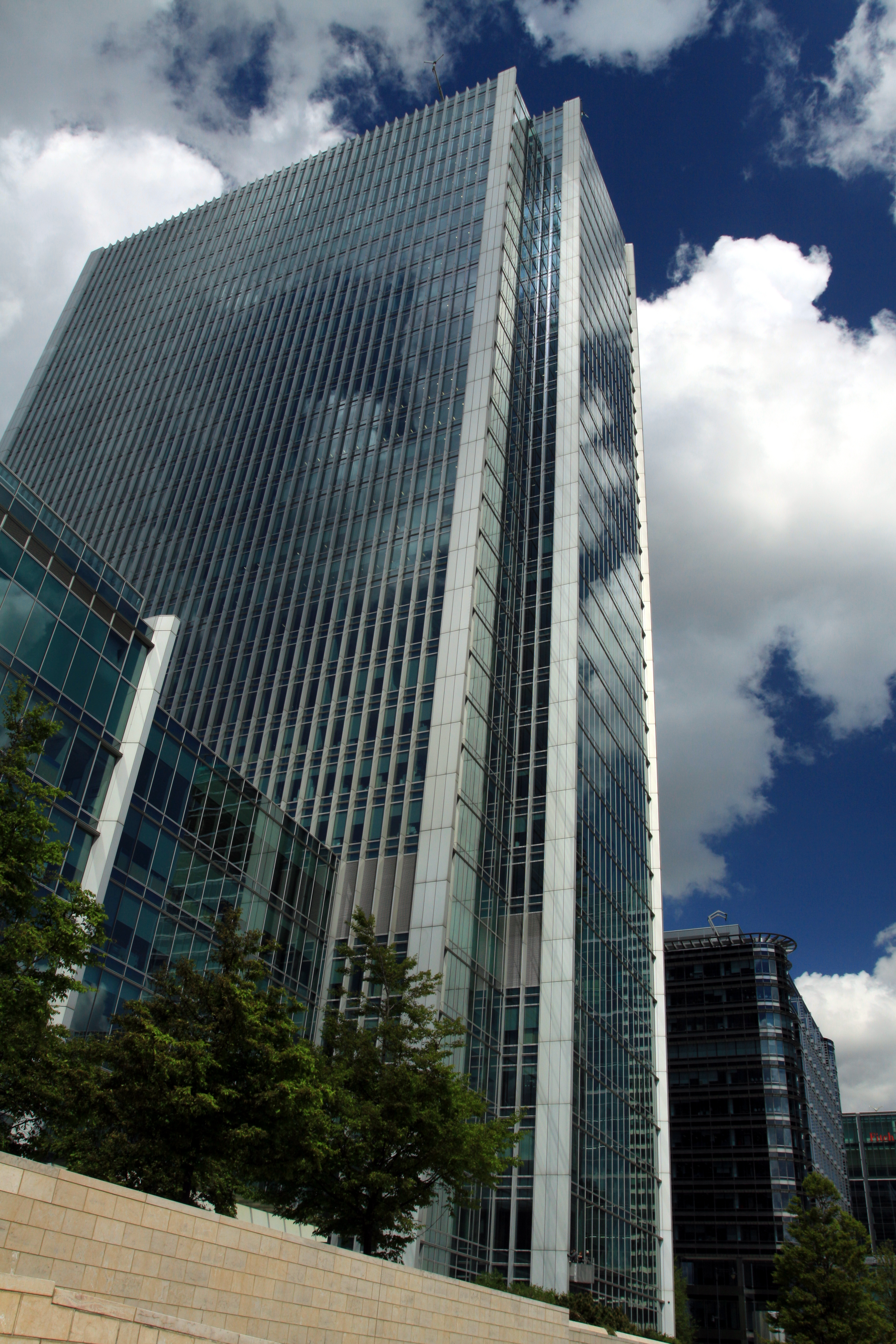
The headquarters of Clifford Chance in Canary Wharf, London

"City" law firms are a notable feature of the legal services market in the United Kingdom. These can broadly be defined as law firms which: have offices in central London; are among the 100 largest law firms operating in the UK; have high average profits per partner; provide services relating to corporate finance, mergers and acquisitions, and financial services; and whose clients include large corporates and financial institutions. City law firms are frequently sub-divided into four broad categories: "Magic Circle" firms; "Silver Circle" firms; "mid-tier" firms; and American law firms with offices in London.

Magic Circle firms are generally regarded as the UK law firms with the best overall reputation, being Allen & Overy, Clifford Chance, Freshfields Bruckhaus Deringer, Linklaters and Slaughter and May. These are consistently the most profitable UK-based law firms, and the first four of these are each among the world's 10 largest law firms measured by 2012 revenues, with Slaughter and May among the top 50.

The members of the Silver Circle are firms perceived to be just below the Magic Circle in terms of their overall reputations, with average profits per equity partner and average revenue per lawyer far above the average for UK law firms, although generally lower than the members of the Magic Circle. There is less consensus regarding the membership of this group but firms commonly described as members include: Ashurst, Bryan Cave Leighton Paisner, Herbert Smith Freehills, Hogan Lovells, Macfarlanes, Norton Rose Fulbright, Simmons and Simmons and Travers Smith.

There are a large number of US-based law firms with offices in London; there are 29 American law firms which have a London office which had 2012 revenues of over US$40 million, and 14 with revenues of over US$100 million (Baker & McKenzie, White & Case, Latham & Watkins, Reed Smith, Skadden, Squire Patton Boggs, Morgan Lewis and Bockius, Mayer Brown, Kirkland & Ellis, Dechert, Shearman & Sterling, Weil Gotshal, Cleary Gottlieb, Jones Day and Sullivan & Cromwell).

=== National law firms ===
"National" law firms are firms with a number of offices around the UK, often including one in London. These firms tend to have a broad range of clients, including public sector bodies, government departments, universities, local authorities, companies and financial institutions. Examples of national law firms include DWF Hill Dickinson and Mills & Reeve.

=== Regional law firms ===
"Regional" law firms are firms based outside London which are associated with a particular area of the UK. These firms are generally smaller and less profitable than City firms, but significantly larger and more profitable than local "high street" firms.

=== High Street law firms ===
"High Street" law firms are small firms which usually operate out of a single office and whose main practice areas are normally family, criminal, private client and taxation law.

== Online comparison services ==
Over the last decade there has been an increase in the popularity of online shopping, gig economy, e-commerce and comparison services with companies like TripAdviser, AirBnB, TaskRabbit and Uber that provide a much more trustworthy and price competitive marketplace for consumers to buy goods and services. This technology trend coupled with changes in British law to introduce Alternative Business Structures to help make legal advice accessible to more people has seen a growing number of technology enabled startups providing legal comparison services similar to those available for tradespeople, energy, insurance and finance which combine ratings, price and trust to assist consumers in selecting good law firms.

Some of the pioneers in this field have included:

- Wigster launched in 2010 by former high street lawyer Nick Miller
- MrLawyer launched in 2012 by barrister Jasvir Singh OBE and property developer Param Singh MBE
- Contact Law launched in 2012 by Thomson Reuters and sold in 2016 to Connect2Law for an undisclosed sum.
- Lexoo launched in 2014 by former lawyer Daniel van Binsbergen.
- The Law Superstore launched in 2016 by former Brilliant Law creator Matthew Briggs after securing a 7 figure seed investment.

== Regulation ==
=== England and Wales ===
The Legal Services Board provides cross-sector oversight regulation of the legal services sector in England and Wales, overseeing the eight separate bodies named as approved regulators in the Legal Services Act 2007. The Legal Services Board was established by the Legal Services Act 2007 and became fully active on 1 January 2010.

The Solicitors Regulation Authority (SRA) is the main regulatory body for solicitors in England and Wales. Its purpose is "to set, promote and secure in the public interest standards of behaviour and professional performance necessary to ensure that clients receive a good service and that the rule of law is upheld".

The Bar Standards Board regulates admission to the Bar for barristers in England and Wales, responds to complaints from the public regarding behaviour and adequacy of representation by members of the Bar, and conducts disciplinary proceedings. The most serious of these are conducted at public hearings.

=== Scotland ===
The Scottish Legal Complaints Commission (SLCC) has been the principal regulator of legal practitioners in Scotland since 1 October 2008. It was introduced by the Legal Profession and Legal Aid (Scotland) Act 2007.

== Demographic trends ==
The diversity of people employed within the British legal system has changed significantly since the 1970s. Since 1913 when there was a ban on women to work as lawyers, women in the industry today accounts for 50% of all practising lawyers. In addition almost 20% of solicitors are from a BAME background with Asian lawyers represented at 12%.

Over the years there have been a number of associations setup to represent the diverse communities that now constitute the legal profession including the Society of Asian Lawyers led by Jo Sidhu, Society of Black Lawyers, the Association of Asian Women Lawyers and others.
