= Special-purpose acquisition company =

Business entity created for acquisitions

A special-purpose acquisition company (SPAC; /spæk/), also known as a blank check company or a blind-pool stock offering, is a shell corporation listed on a stock exchange with the purpose of acquiring (or merging with) a private company, thus taking the private company public through a procedure which requires fewer regulatory filings and has fewer safeguards for investors than the initial public offering (IPO) process. According to the U.S. Securities and Exchange Commission (SEC), SPACs are created specifically to pool funds to finance a future merger or acquisition opportunity within a set timeframe; these opportunities usually have yet to be identified while raising funds.

In the U.S., SPACs are registered with the SEC and considered publicly traded companies. The general public may buy their shares on stock exchanges before any merger or acquisition takes place. For this reason they have at times been referred to as the "poor man's private equity funds". The majority of companies pursuing SPACs do so on the Nasdaq or New York Stock Exchange in the US, although other exchanges, such as the Euronext Amsterdam, Singapore Exchange, and Hong Kong Stock Exchange have also overseen a small volume of SPAC deals.

Despite the popularity and growth in the number of SPACs, academic analysis shows investor returns on SPAC companies post-merger are almost uniformly negative, although investors in SPACs and merged companies may earn excess returns immediately after the merger. Proliferation of SPACs usually accelerates around periods of economic bubbles, such as the "everything bubble" between 2020 and 2021.

== History ==
Blind-pool stock offerings existed in the 1980s. Their rejuvenation began in the early 1990s with investment bank GKN Securities and its founder David Nussbaum, who was later fined by the National Association of Securities Dealers for overcharging investors but went on to found EarlyBirdCapital in 2003.

After the 1980s, the federal government increased regulation around SPACs, requiring that at merger, if an investor does not like the acquired company, the investor can opt out and get their money (plus interest) refunded, because, they were effectively blank check companies, which, as NPR put it, "were so infamous for scamming investors that a federal law was passed to crack down on them".

== Characteristics ==
=== Mechanics ===
SPACs generally trade as units or as separate common shares and warrants on the Nasdaq and New York Stock Exchange (as of 2008) once the public offering has been declared effective by the SEC, distinguishing the SPAC from a blank check company formed under SEC Rule 419.

By market convention, 85% to 100% of the proceeds raised in the IPO for the SPAC are held in trust to be used at a later date for the merger or acquisition.

In addition, the target of the acquisition must have a fair market value that is equal to at least 80% of the SPAC's net assets at the time of acquisition. Previous SPAC structures required a positive shareholder vote by 80% of the SPAC's public shareholders for the transaction to be consummated.

==== Dilution ====
According to Stanford University law professor Michael Klausner, one reason that SPAC companies have performed so poorly is that the company going public may only receive 50% of all the money supplied by investors, with the rest lost to fees paid to sponsors (the organization that originated the SPAC; often taking 20%), bankers, lawyers, and payments to early investors.

New SEC rules adopted in 2024 require potential for dilution to be displayed prominently on SPAC filings, whereas previously this information was scattered in multiple places and unclear.

=== Banking ===
SPAC Research, an entity running a SPAC database, maintains an underwriter league table which can be sorted by bookrunner volume or other criteria for any year or selection of years. As of January 2021 I-Bankers Securities Inc. stated that it had participated in 132 SPAC IPOs as lead or co-manager since 2004. In the years leading up to 2021, bulge bracket banks started participating in more SPAC IPOs, with Cantor Fitzgerald & Co. and Deutsche Bank Securities Inc. on the cover of 30 SPAC IPOs from 2015 to August 2019. Citigroup, Credit Suisse, Goldman Sachs, and BofA have all built a significant SPAC practice, while Cantor Fitzgerald led all SPAC underwriters in 2019 by book-running 14 SPACs that raised over US$3.08 billion in IPO proceeds.

=== SPACs in Europe ===
In July 2007, Pan-European Hotel Acquisition Company N.V. was the first SPAC offering listed on the Euronext Amsterdam, raising approximately €115 million. I-Bankers Securities has been the underwriter with CRT Capital Group as lead-underwriter. That listing on NYSE Euronext (Amsterdam) was followed by Liberty International Acquisition Company, raising €600 million in January 2008. Liberty is the third largest SPAC in the world and the largest outside the U.S. The first German SPAC was Germany1 Acquisition Ltd., which raised $437.2 million at Euronext Amsterdam with Deutsche Bank and I-Bankers Securities as underwriters. Loyens & Loeff served as legal counsels in The Netherlands.

In March 2021, a report prepared by Lord Hill for the Chancellor of Exchequer recommended a series of changes to London company listing rules to make them more favorable to SPAC listings. Among the report's proposals is to reduce the percentage of shares that must be offered to the public from 25% to 15%.

=== SPACs in Asia ===
On March 18, 2022, Aquila Acquisition Corp debuted on the Hong Kong Exchanges and Clearing Limited (HKEX). The IPO received lukewarm reception by investors, with shares down 3% in the two-week period post-IPO. Despite this decrease, there is a high demand for SPAC public offerings in Hong Kong, with HKEX reporting that they have received applications for 11 additional SPAC IPOs.

== Statistics ==
According to an industry study published in January 2019, from 2004 through 2018, approximately $49.14 billion was raised across 332 SPAC IPOs in the US. In that period, 2018 was the largest year for SPAC issuance since 2007, with 46 SPAC IPOs raising approximately $10.74 billion. SPACs seeking an acquisition in the energy sector raised $1.4bn in 2018, after raising a record $3.9bn in 2017. NASDAQ was the most common listing exchange for SPACs in 2018, with 34 SPACs raising $6.4bn. GS Acquisition Holdings Corp. and Churchill Capital Corp. raised the largest SPACs of 2018, with $690mm each in IPO proceeds. In 2019, 59 SPAC IPOs raised $13.6 billion. Nearly 250 SPACs raised more than $83 billion in 2020. In the first month of 2021 there were 75 SPACs.

From 2009 to 2024, the landscape of SPAC IPOs has seen considerable variance. In 2009, a single SPAC IPO garnered $36 million, marking a modest start. Over the years, activity increased, peaking in 2021 with 613 IPOs that collectively raised around $162 billion, averaging $265 million per IPO.

In 2022, the SPAC market shrank significantly, with only 86 SPAC IPOs compared to 613 in 2021, reflecting more challenging economic conditions and increased regulatory scrutiny. Total funds raised dropped to $13.4 billion from $162.5 billion in 2021, and the average IPO size decreased from $265.1 million to $156.1 million. Despite these challenges, 103 merger deals were completed, illustrating ongoing difficulties in securing successful mergers.

In 2023, the SPAC market faced challenges with only 31 IPOs due to higher interest rates and stricter financial policies. However, there were signs of stabilization towards the year's end. The total raised was $3.8 billion, with an average IPO size of $124.1 million, and 98 mergers were completed. A slight improvement in initial trading performance by December suggested a potential stabilization, with IPOs closing slightly above their expected values, offering a hopeful outlook for 2024.

In 2024, SPAC activity partly recovered: 57 IPOs raised $9.6 billion—up from $3.8 billion in 2023—at an average IPO size of $168.4 million. The bulk of activity came in the second half of the year. Seventy-three business combinations closed during 2024.

SPAC IPOs have experienced drastic fluctuations since 2009, peaking in 2021, when SPACInsider reports a record $162.503 billion was raised:

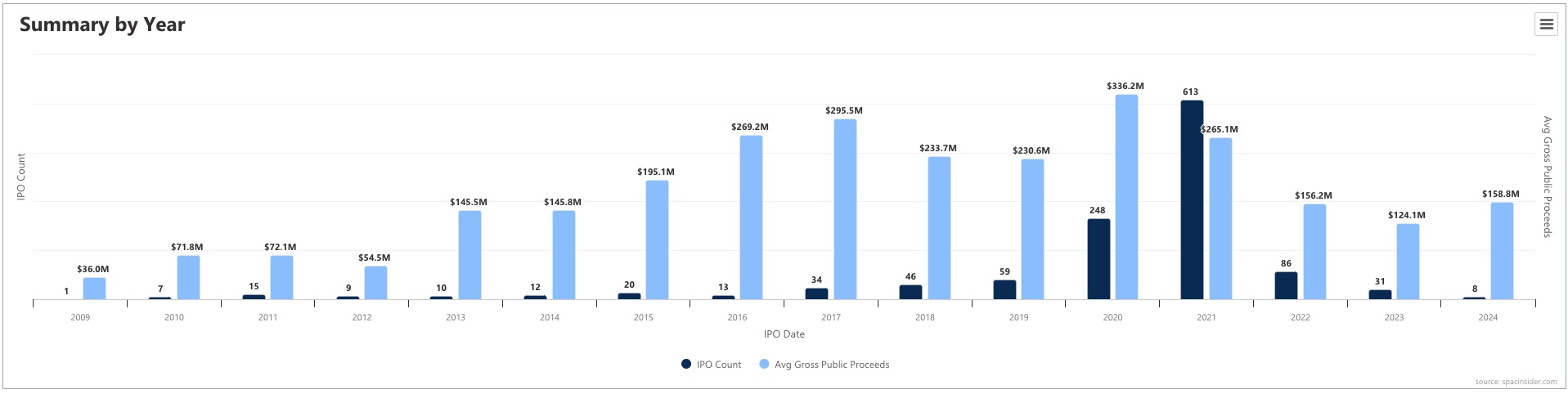
Number of IPO companies which used SPAC to go public and Average Gross Public Investment per SPAC. As of 16 May 2024

=== Past performance ===
In a March 2020 event, Allison Lee, acting chair of the SEC, said that the "investment returns don't match the hype surrounding the SPAC bubble."

A study found that as of the 1st of December 2022, American-listed SPACs that completed their mergers between July 2020 and December 2021 had a mean share price of $3.85. This constitutes a fall of over 60% from the standard $10 per share that SPAC shareholders could have received if they redeemed their shares. The study also found that "The average post-merger SPAC during this period underperformed the average traditional IPO by 26%." Another study, focusing on a longer timeframe of U.S. SPACs from December 2012 until June 2021 found average stock price decreases of 14.1% after 1 year of the merger announcement and 18% after 2 years.

Average DeSPAC Share % Losses by Industry (2009–2025)
| Category | Loss (%) |
|---|---|
| Cannabis | 98 |
| Electric Vehicle | 88 |
| Crypto | 71 |
| Biotech | 70 |
| Healthcare | 69 |
| Consumer | 67 |
| Transportation | 65 |
| Tmt | 63 |
| Technology | 62 |
| Renewable Energy | 59 |
| Sustainability | 55 |
| Hospitality & Entertainment | 54 |
| Real Estate | 49 |
| Space | 43 |
| Natural Resources | 41 |
| Gaming | 41 |
| Manufacturing | 31 |
| Industrials | 20 |
| Financial Services | 19 |

== Regulation ==
In the US the SPAC public offering structure is governed by the Securities and Exchange Commission (SEC). A public offering for a SPAC is typically filed with the SEC under an S-1 registration statement (or an F-1 for a foreign private issuer) and is classified by the SEC under SIC code 6770 – Blank Checks. Full disclosure of the SPAC structure, target industries or geographic regions, management team biographies, share ownership, potential conflicts of interest and risk factors are standard material covered in the S-1 registration statement. It is believed that the SEC has studied SPACs to determine whether they require special regulations to ensure that these vehicles are not abused, as blind pool trusts and blank-check corporations have been over the years. Many believe that SPACs do have corporate governance mechanisms in place to protect shareholders. SPACs listed on the American Stock Exchange are required to be Sarbanes–Oxley compliant at the time of the offering, including such mandatory requirements as a majority of the board of directors being independent, and having audit and compensation committees.

=== Regulatory developments ===
In 2022, Elizabeth Warren released a report showing that Wall Street insiders were using SPACs in ways that harmed investors, and called for regulations to curb the abuse.

On January 24th, 2024, the SEC unveiled new rules for Special Purpose Acquisition Companies (SPACs), introducing clarifications to enhance regulatory transparency and integrity without significantly altering the existing framework. Critical updates include maintaining the current stance on SPACs under the '40 Act and the definition of banks as underwriters while refining the criteria for forward-looking statements by redefining "blank check company" and eliminating one safe harbor provision. Additionally, the SEC has encouraged more realistic management projections for DeSPAC transactions and required detailed disclosures on board votes and the dilutive impacts of compensation and securities issuances. These developments aim to enhance transparency and integrity within the SPAC ecosystem, reflecting a cautious approach to regulation without fundamentally altering existing practices. Warren commended the SEC on the new rules.

== See also ==
- Capital formation
- Direct listing
- Initial public offering
- Reverse IPO
- Special-purpose entity

== Bibliography ==
- Feldman, David N. (2018). Regulation A+ and Other Alternatives to a Traditional IPO. Hoboken, New Jersey: Wiley. ISBN 9781119416166.
- Klausner, Michael; Ohlrogge, Michael; Ruan, Emily (2021). "A Sober Look at SPACs". Stanford Law and Economics Olin Working Paper. 559.
- Pollard, Troy (2016). "Sneaking in the back door? An evaluation of reverse mergers and IPOs". Review of Quantitative Finance and Accounting. 47 (2): 305–341. doi:10.1007/s11156-015-0502-8. S2CID 54029302.
- Sjostrom, W. K. Jr. (2007–2008). "The Truth About Reverse Mergers". Entrepreneurial Business Law Journal. 2: 743–751.
