= Dirk Anbeek =

- Born: April 25, 1963 (age 63); Netherlands
- Education: Business economics, Registered Controller (RC)
- Occupations: Business executive, football administrator
- Years active: 1988–present
- Employer: AFC Ajax N.V.
- Known for: Vice-Chairman of the Supervisory Board of AFC Ajax
- Title: Vice-Chairman of the Supervisory Board, AFC Ajax N.V. Chairman of the Supervisory Board, Sligro Food Group; Chairman of the Supervisory Board, Roompot / Landal

Dirk Jan Anbeek (born 25 April 1963) is a Dutch corporate executive and football administrator. He has was vice-chairman of the supervisory board (Raad van Commissarissen) of Eredivisie club AFC Ajax N.V. since December 2024.

Anbeek previously was chief executive officer (CEO) of real estate firm Wereldhave N.V. (2012–2019) and holiday park operator Landal GreenParks (2019–2023). He is also chairman of the supervisory board at Sligro Food Group and Roompot / Landal.

== Early life and education ==
Anbeek was born on 25 April 1963 in the Netherlands. He studied business economics at university level and qualified as a Registered Controller (RC).

== Corporate career ==
Anbeek began his career in 1988 at DSM before joining PwC as a senior consultant in 1994. From 1996 to 2005, he held executive roles at Royal Ahold, including CFO of Scandinavian retailer ICA AB (2001–2003). He later was Director of Franchise and Real Estate at Albert Heijn (2006–2009).

In 2009, Anbeek joined Wereldhave N.V. as managing director, then CEO from 2012 to 2019. He became CEO of Landal GreenParks in 2019, managing its organizational integration with Roompot until 2023.

He has been on supervisory boards for IT provider Ordina (2012–2020), Detailresult Groep (2014–2021), Deen Supermarkten, and municipal transit operator GVB (2020–2024). In 2023, he assumed the supervisory chairmanship at Sligro Food Group and Sandy HoldCo B.V. (parent company of Roompot and Landal GreenParks). He is also a board member of the National Committee 4 and 5 May.

== Football administration ==
=== AFC Ajax ===
On 1 November 2024, AFC Ajax N.V. nominated Anbeek alongside Hermine Voûte and Sirik Goeman to succeed departing supervisory board members Annette Mosman, Cees van Oevelen, and Leo van Wijk. He was formally appointed vice-chairman of the supervisory board on 16 December 2024 for a four-year term.

During a November 2025 shareholders' assembly, Anbeek spoke on behalf of the board regarding media coverage surrounding the club, criticizing unverified leaks and requesting greater journalistic restraint while calling on internal stakeholders to maintain institutional decorum. He also oversaw a review of Ajax's governance structure (bestuursmodel) between the association and the publicly listed company.

In January 2026, Anbeek led a board restructuring following the planned resignations of Sirik Goeman and Danny Blind, announcing the nomination of five new supervisory board members: Lesley Bamberger (intended chairman), Anita Coronel, Marry de Gaay Fortman, former Ajax player Edo Ophof, and Duncan Stutterheim.
