= Marry de Gaay Fortman =

Dutch lawyer and corporate director

- Born: 22 September 1965 (age 60); Amsterdam, Netherlands
- Education: Vrije Universiteit Amsterdam
- Occupations: Lawyer, corporate director
- Employer: Houthoff
- Known for: Corporate governance, women's advocacy in business
- Parent: Bas de Gaay Fortman
- Relatives: Wilhelm Friedrich de Gaay Fortman (grandfather)

Marry de Gaay Fortman (born 22 September 1965) is a Dutch corporate lawyer and business executive. A partner at the Dutch law firm Houthoff, she serves on the supervisory boards of several Dutch institutions, including KLM, De Nederlandsche Bank (the Dutch Central Bank), and professional football club AFC Ajax.

== Early life and education ==
De Gaay Fortman was born on 22 September 1965 in Amsterdam. She is a member of the patrician De Gaay Fortman family; her father is the politician and scholar Bas de Gaay Fortman, and her grandfather, Wilhelm Friedrich de Gaay Fortman, served as the Dutch Minister of the Interior.

She studied law at the Vrije Universiteit Amsterdam (VU Amsterdam), graduating in 1988.

== Career ==
=== Legal career ===
Following her graduation in 1988, De Gaay Fortman joined the Amsterdam-based law firm Houthoff (then Houthoff Buruma) as an attorney. Specializing in corporate governance, public-private regulatory law, and economic public law, she became a partner in 1997. From 2001 to 2007, she served as the firm's managing partner. She remains a senior partner at the firm, advising regulated enterprises and government bodies on strategic and contentious matters.

=== Supervisory boards and corporate governance ===
Outside of her legal practice, De Gaay Fortman serves as a professional supervisor and non-executive director. She is a member of the supervisory boards of De Nederlandsche Bank (DNB) and the Dutch flag carrier airline KLM. She has also held supervisory roles at the Amsterdam municipal transport company GVB, the IT service provider Conclusion Group, and cultural institutions such as Internationaal Theater Amsterdam (formerly Toneelgroep Amsterdam) and the Paleis Het Loo museum.

On 20 January 2026, AFC Ajax announced her nomination to the club's Supervisory Board (Raad van Commissarissen). Her nomination was approved by shareholders at an Extraordinary General Meeting on 9 March 2026. She was appointed to a four-year term running until 2030, joining a restructured board chaired by Lesley Bamberger.

=== Advocacy and writing ===
De Gaay Fortman is an advocate for gender diversity and equal opportunity in the Dutch corporate sector. She previously served as the chair of Stichting Topvrouwen (Top Women Foundation), a national initiative aimed at increasing the flow of women into executive and supervisory boardrooms in the Netherlands. During her tenure, she actively campaigned against the assertion that qualified women are difficult to find, arguing that male executives also require time and opportunity to grow into their roles. She has stated that female directors often bring a higher degree of independent thinking to boardrooms, reducing the risk of corporate echo chambers.

In 2018, she authored the management and career book Verdrink geen dooie eend: De kunst van beminnelijke doeltreffendheid (Don't Drown a Dead Duck: The Art of Amiable Effectiveness). The book blends autobiographical anecdotes from her career on the Zuidas with strategic advice for navigating corporate politics and male-dominated environments.

== Personal life ==
De Gaay Fortman resides in the Netherlands. She is married and has four children. Three of her children have also pursued careers in law.
