= NautaDutilh =

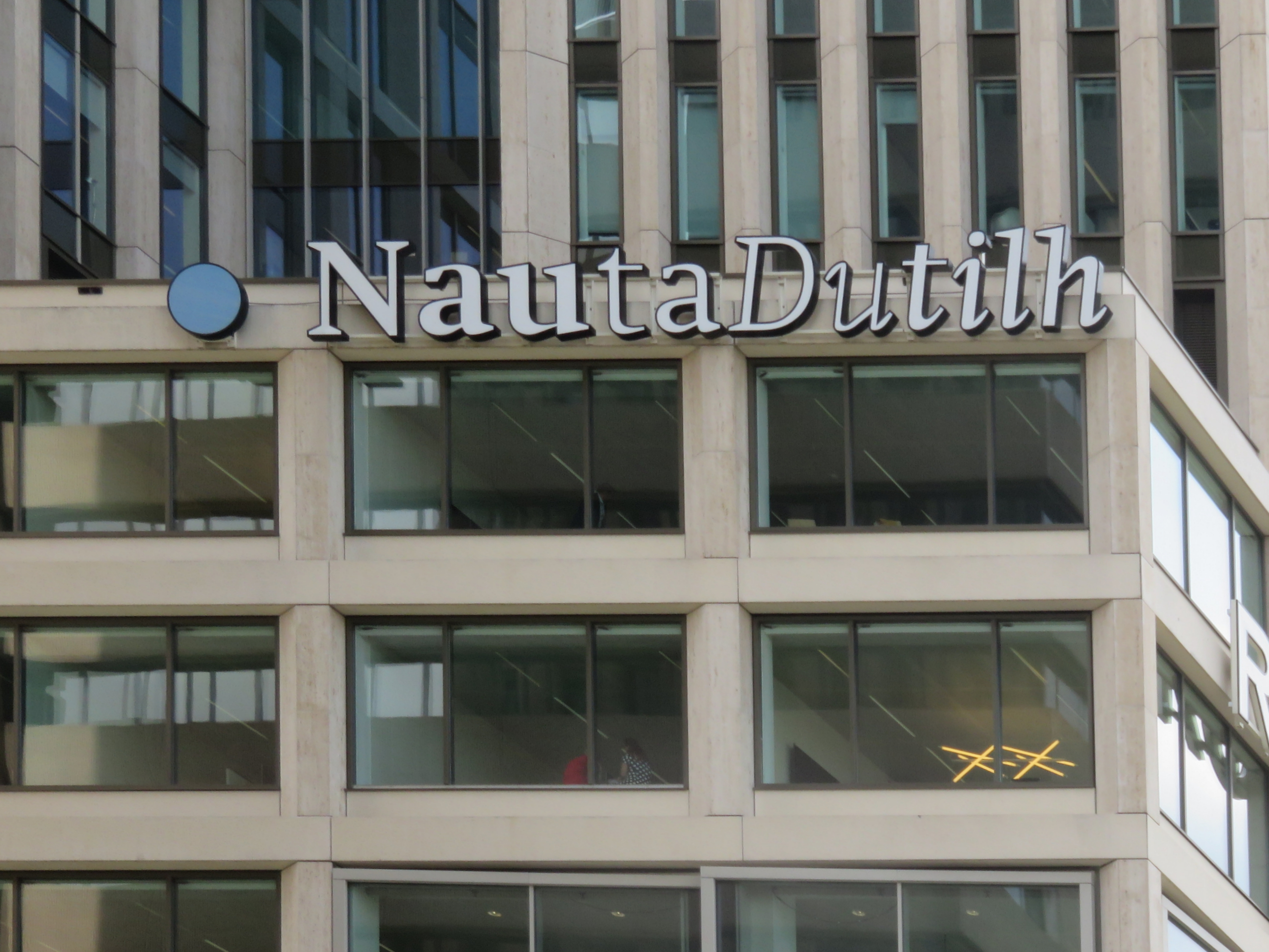
NautaDutilh, 2019

NautaDutilh, an independent law firm practicing Dutch, Belgian, and Luxembourg law. NautaDutilh is one of the largest law firms in Europe, with over 400 lawyers, civil law notaries, and tax advisers in offices in Amsterdam, Brussels, London, Luxembourg, New York, and Rotterdam. The firm history dates back to 1724.

NautaDutilh's core practice areas are corporate, banking, and financial law, but it is also in the areas of tax, intellectual property, competition and antitrust law, telecoms and media, commercial property, and insurance. In 1795, the firm was involved in loan negotiations between Dutch bankers and representatives of the US government to finance the rebuilding and expansion of Washington, D.C.

In 1903, NautaDutilh hired the first female lawyer in the Netherlands, Adolphine Kok.

== Activities ==
- Advised Deutsche Bank AG along with Simpson Thacher & Bartlett and White & Case on European buyout firm Cinven's €925 million LBO of Klöckner Werke AG in 2001.
- Represented Alitalia SpA in a successful €253.3 million arbitration case against KLM for wrongful termination by the latter of its alliance with the Italian airline in 2000. An arbitral award was rendered in 2002. Cleary Gottlieb Steen & Hamilton and Studio Legale Ughi e Nunziante served as co-counsel to Alitalia.
- Counseled a banking syndicate led by Deutsche Bank AG, Barclays Capital, Dresdner Kleinwort Wasserstein, HSBC Bank plc, Salomon Brothers International Ltd, and JP Morgan plc. in a €15 billion loan facility for E.ON Insurance in 2002.
- Represented Air France in its €784 million merger with KLM in 2003. Linklaters LLP served as co-counsel.
- Advised Japan Bank for International Cooperation (formerly Japan Export-Import Bank or JEXIM), the Marubeni Corporation, and Mitsui on a $3.5 billion co-financing and long-term off-take contract with Petróleos de Venezuela SA in 2007.
- Counseled ABN Amro Bank on a €71.1 billion takeover bid by a banking consortium consisting of the Royal Bank of Scotland plc (RBS), Banco Santander SA, and Fortis Bank BV in 2008.
- Represented Dexia Bank Nederland in seeking court approval of an approximately €1 billion collective settlement of a class action suit brought against Dexia in relation to its securities leasing products. This was the first-ever judicial ratification of a collective settlement in the financial services sector in the Netherlands.
- Representing Eureko B.V. in its multibillion-euro BIT claim against the Polish government with respect to Eureko's investment in PZU, Poland's largest insurance company (ongoing)
- Representing Yukos in disputes with the Russian government (ongoing).
- Advising ING Group on the Dutch government’s assumption of credit risk.
- Representing Lancôme (L'Oréal Group) in a landmark case in which the Supreme Court of the Netherlands upheld the appellate court's judgment finding that the scent of a perfume constitutes an original work can qualify for copyright protection.
- Advised Johnson & Johnson on its bid for all ordinary shares of the biopharmaceutical company Crucell N.V.. Cravath, Swaine & Moore served as US counsel to Johnson & Johnson.
- Advised Wind Acquisition Finance SA on the placement of €2.7 billion in high-yield bonds as part of a €6.6 billion deal. This transaction was considered the largest European high-yield bond issuance in 2010.
- Assisted the Belgian Federal Holding and Investment Company [nl] (SFPI/FPIM) further to the underwriting by KBC of €3.5 billion in non-voting debt instruments in order to improve consumer confidence in the group and strengthen the core tier-1 ratios applicable to its banking and insurance activities.
- Advised Shire (a UK-Irish biopharmaceutical company listed on the London Stock Exchange and NASDAQ) on its all-cash voluntary takeover bid for the outstanding shares of Movetis, a Belgian biotech company listed on Euronext Brussels.
- Along with Slaughter and May, assisted QBE in its acquisition of Secura NV, a Belgian-based reinsurer, further to a highly competitive auction process. QBE, which was particularly interested in Secura's long-term relationship with insurers throughout continental Europe, paid EUR 267 million for the reinsurer.
- Assisted the Belgian professional association of listed investment funds (BEAMA) with the drafting of a new royal decree on REITs (sicafis/vastgoedbevaks) and in negotiations with the competent authorities. The royal decree, which was prepared in consultation with the representatives of several local REITs, aims to level the playing field with foreign REITs by resolving several issues that had come to light over the years and which had resulted in regulatory concerns for certain REITs, in particular newer ones.
- Advised APG on the sale of AlpInvest to the Carlyle Group and the management of AlpInvest in 2011.
- Advised W.P. Carey & Co. LLC on its €157 million acquisition and triple-net leaseback of six logistics facilities to Dutch food retailer C1000 BV in 2011.
- Represented the Brussels-Capital Region before the Belgian Constitutional Court in an action to set aside the Flemish decree on carbon dioxide emissions trading for aviation activities. This decree transposed Community Directive 2008/101/EC of 19 November 2008 into law in the Flemish Region.

== See also ==
- Law firms of the Netherlands
