= Herbert Smith Freehills Kramer =

Multinational law firm

Herbert Smith Freehills Kramer LLP
- Headquarters: London, England; Sydney, Australia
- No. of offices: 26 (2020)
- No. of lawyers: 2,600 (2024)
- No. of employees: c.5,000 (2024)
- Key people: Justin D'Agostino (CEO); Rebecca Maslen-Stannage (Senior Partner)
- Revenue: ▲£1.306 billion (2023/24)
- Profit per equity partner: ▲£1.315 million (2023/24)
- Date founded: Herbert Smith (1882); Freehills (1852); Kramer Levin Naftalis & Frankel (1968); Merger between Herbert Smith and Freehills (2012); Merger between Herbert Smith Freehills and Kramer Levin Naftalis & Frankel (2025)
- Founder: Herbert Smith; Freehills; Kramer Levin Naftalis & Frankel
- Company type: Limited liability partnership (Herbert Smith Freehills LLP); Partnership (Herbert Smith Freehills)
- Website: hsfkramer.com

Herbert Smith Freehills Kramer LLP (HSF Kramer) is a global law firm with headquarters in London, England, and Sydney, Australia. As of 2024, the firm was the 33rd largest by revenue. Its predecessor practice, Herbert Smith Freehills, was formed on 1 October 2012 by a merger between the United Kingdom-based Herbert Smith founded in 1882, then a member of the Silver Circle of leading UK law firms, and Freehills founded in 1852, one of the Big Six Australian law firms.

Herbert Smith Freehills announced its merger with U.S. law firm Kramer Levin effective 1 May 2025. The new firm is known as Herbert Smith Freehills Kramer, abbreviated as HSF Kramer.

== History ==
=== Herbert Smith ===
Herbert Smith (known as Norman Herbert Smith until 1903) was established by Norman Herbert Smith in 1882. Norman Herbert Smith was descended from Sir William ap Thomas on his father's side and William the Conqueror through his mother's family. Norman Herbert Smith first opened an office at Nicholas House, 12/13 Nicholas Lane.

Norman Herbert Smith helped launch the career of Lord Atkin, known for giving the leading judgement in the case of Donoghue v Stevenson, who himself noted that "Smith continued to be my client throughout the whole of my time as a barrister and in the first years almost my only one."

Herbert Smith's specialisation in the early 20th century was in company flotations and advice to mining companies. Later its work expanded to litigation, mergers, and equity matters. Herbert Smith was instructed on the flotation of British Power and Light Corporation and advised on the merger of Columbia Graphophone Company with the Gramophone Company (owner of the His Master's Voice label) to form EMI.

The Herbert Smith partner, F.A. Mann, helped transform the legal profession in England, where litigation was traditionally managed by clerks and barristers.

Its relationship with US law firm Cravath, Swaine & Moore led to Time Warner instructing Herbert Smith for its £220bn acquisition of America Online (AOL) – the largest ever merger at the time. In 2011, revenues were £465 million and profits-per-equity-partner (PEP) were £900,000.

Herbert Smith had a European partnership with the German firm Gleiss Lutz and the Benelux firm Stibbe until 2011. A plan to merge with those firms did not go ahead.

At the time of its merger with Freehills, Herbert Smith had around 240 partners, 1,300 lawyers, with offices in Europe, the Middle East and Asia.

=== 2012 Freehills merger ===
Freehills traced its history back to the practices of Clarke & Moule in Melbourne (1853), Stephen Henry Parker in Perth (1868), Bernard Austin Freehill in Sydney (1871), and John Nicholson in Perth (1896). Predecessors of the firm are notable for having adopted open employment policies, hiring Catholics and Jews when many other firms would not. They are also notable for becoming the first major Australian law firm to appoint a female partner, and forming the first national law partnership in Australia.

Herbert Smith Freehills resulted from the merger, in October 2012, of the two firms. The merger involved an immediate financial integration of the firms in a single partnership and profit pool, an unusual structure for these kinds of mergers. The merger was complicated by differing remuneration structures across the firms; with Herbert Smith practicing a lockstep compensation system, while Freehills practised a merit-based compensation system. Freehills also had a greater number of equity partners.

After merging, the firm began practice in Germany. In September 2012 it opened an office in New York City, focused on international dispute resolution work. A South Korean office was opened in Seoul in April 2013. The combined firm also nearly doubled its total number of international secondees in its first year of operations. In November 2015, Herbert Smith Freehills announced the opening of its third office in Germany, Düsseldorf, headed by Clifford Chance's former head of litigation and arbitration practice.

In February 2022, the Greenwoods & Herbert Smith Freehills taxation practice was sold to PwC.

Brown Rudnick recruited a 34-lawyer intellectual property litigation team from the firm in early August 2026, depleting the department.

=== 2025 Merger with Kramer Levin ===
In November 2024, Herbert Smith Freehills announced it would merge with Kramer Levin Naftalis & Frankel, a transaction which took place on 1 June 2025. The firm is now known as Herbert Smith Freehills Kramer.

== Offices ==
As of September 2020, HSF has 26 offices in Asia, Australia, Europe, North America and the Middle East. The Seoul and Tokyo offices are staffed by Commonwealth lawyers and do not practice local law. The Tokyo office relies upon a referral arrangement with Japan's Big four law firms to avoid competing with them for local legal work, and due to difficulties with hiring Japanese attorneys.

== Controversies ==
=== Antisemitic tweet ===
Following the firebombing of the Adass Israel Synagogue in Melbourne, Damien Hazard, an Australia corporate lawyer who has been a partner with HSF for 12 years tweeted "Never too soon for Jeremy Leibler to just invent a link with anti-genocide protests". The tweet was deleted and HSF chair and senior partner Rebecca Maslen-Stannage apologized for it and launched an immediate investigation. The firm voted to remove Hazard.

== Notable clients and cases ==
=== Sergey Podoprigorov ===
Herbert Smith Freehills helped Sergey Podoprigorov, a judge in the Russian Federation who sentenced Vladimir Kara-Murza, a prominent journalist, author, filmmaker, human rights activist and political prisoner that received an extremely harsh prison sentence in Russia in 2023 after publicly criticizing the Russian invasion of Ukraine. HSF prepared an appeal asking the United States Department of the Treasury to remove Podoprigorov from the "Magnitsky list" of corrupt Russian officials responsible for persecution of people fighting against corruption and repression in the country.

=== Sir Alan Sugar ===
Herbert Smith Freehills advised Sir Alan Sugar in relation to his dispute with Terry Venables over the English Premier League football club Tottenham Hotspur.

=== Hotel Chocolat ===
Herbert Smith Freehills advised UK chocolatier Hotel Chocolat on its £534m takeover by US food giant Mars Inc. in 2023.

=== Financial Conduct Authority ===
Herbert Smith Freehills successfully secured a landmark victory for the Financial Conduct Authority (FCA) in a High Court case that clarifies whether businesses were entitled to compensation for Covid-19-related disruptions under their insurance policies. The ruling dealt a significant blow to insurers, potentially triggering payouts for tens of thousands of businesses with business interruption claims.

=== Google ===
Herbert Smith Freehills is representing Google in a £13.6bn collective action lawsuit, which has been allowed to proceed by London's competition tribunal. The case alleges that Google is abusing its dominant position by prioritising its own advertising technology.

=== Aercap Ireland Limited ===
In 2021, AerCap turned to Cravath Swaine & Moore and Herbert Smith Freehills for counsel on its $30 billion acquisition of General Electric’s Capital Aviation Services (GE Capital Aviation Services). Herbert Smith Freehills is representing Aercap Ireland Limited, the world’s largest aircraft lessor, in a major and complex legal battle in the High Court to recover losses from insurers over more than 400 aircraft stranded in Russia due to Western sanctions. The planes, worth almost $10 billion, have remained in Russia since the sanctions were imposed following the war in Ukraine, with Russian lessees failing to return them. Aercap is pursuing a claim for $3.5 billion from insurers, including AIG and Lloyd’s, under its all-risk insurance policy, or alternatively, $1.2 billion under its war-risk policy. The case, being heard in the Rolls Building’s ‘super court,’ is one of the most high-profile and costly trials in the UK, with insurers challenging the claims on several grounds.

=== Hereditary membership of the House of Lords ===
Association of Conservative Peers in challenging part of the law that removed most hereditary membership of the House of Lords.

=== Pinochet ===
The Government of Chile in the Pinochet case. Lawrence Collins KC appeared whilst partner at Herbert Smith having a few months earlier become the first solicitor to exercise rights of audience in the House of Lords when he represented the Law Society on the issue of barristers' costs in legally aided criminal trials.

== Associates and alumni ==
- Francis Freehill (1854–1908), Australian solicitor and activist.
- Bernard Austin Freehill (died 1880), Australian solicitor and founder of one of the constituent firms that later became Freehills and brother of Francis Freehill.
- Norman Herbert Smith (1857–1920), founder of the firm Norman Hebert Smith (later Herbert Smith).
- Francis Mann CBE, FBA, QC (Hon.) (1907–1991), a German-born British jurist and one of the most influential legal scholars of his generation.
- Garry Hart, Baron Hart of Chilton (born 1940), member of the House of Lords, Expert and then Special Adviser to the Lord Chancellor.
- Lawrence Collins, Baron Collins of Mapesbury (born 1941), British judge and former justice of the Supreme Court of the United Kingdom and first solicitor to have reached such a senior level within the judiciary.
- Bo Vesterdorf (born 1945), former Danish judge who has been president of the European Court of First Instance.
- David Gold, Baron Gold (born 1951), former senior partner and founder of David Gold & Associates.
- Keith Steele (1951–2009), former senior partner of Freehills, New Zealand cricketer and author.
- Margaret Mountford (born 1951), Northern Irish lawyer, businesswoman, academic and television personality best known for her role in The Apprentice.
- Peggy O'Neal (born 1952), American-born Australian lawyer who, from 2013 to 2022, served as the president of the Richmond Football Club in the Australian Football League (AFL), being the first woman in AFL history to serve as a club president.
- Trevor Asserson (born 1956), British lawyer, founder and senior partner at Asserson Law Offices.
- Richard Loveridge (born 1963), former Australian rules footballer who played with Hawthorn in the Victorian Football League (VFL) during the 1980s.
- Suzie Miller (born 1963/4), Australian playwright, librettist, screenwriter, and lawyer.
- Thomas Leech (born 1964), British High Court judge.
- Sir Adam Johnson (born 1965), British High Court Judge.
- Ewen Fergusson (born 1965), former partner, business advisor and public servant.
- Sir Ed Davey (born 1965), British politician and leader of the Liberal Democrats since 2020.
- Clare McGlynn (born 1970), professor of law at Durham University, member of the UK Parliament's Independent Expert Panel.
- Mark Reckless (born 1970), British politician.
- Michaelia Cash (born 1970), Australian politician, former attorney-general, and Cabinet minister from 2015 to 2022.
- David Allen Green (born 1971), British lawyer and writer.
- Kelly O'Dwyer (born 1977), former solicitor at Freehills, and former Australian politician. She served in the House of Representatives from 2009 to 2019, representing the Liberal Party, and held senior ministerial office from 2015 to 2019.
- Chuka Umunna (born 1978), British businessman and former politician who served as Member of Parliament (MP) for Streatham from 2010 until 2019.
- Matt Keogh (born 1981), Australian politician, Minister for Veterans' Affairs and Minister for Defence Personnel in the Albanese government.
- Clancy Rudeforth (born 1983),former Australian rules footballer who played for the Claremont Football Club in the West Australian Football League (WAFL), captaining the side from 2009 to 2011.
- Alex Ryvchin (born 1983), Australian author, advocate, media commentator, and lawyer.
- Timothy McEvoy, judge of the Federal Court in Australia.
- Sophie Deen, British children's author and leader in the field of coding and STEM for young people and CEO of Bright Little Labs.
- David Kershaw, Professor of Law at the London School of Economics (LSE) and the current Dean of LSE Law School.
- Kate Jenkins AO, Australian human rights lawyer and commissioner and sports administrator.
- Kathleen Farrell, former partner and judge of the Federal Court of Australia.
