= Hengeler Mueller =

German law firm

- Headquarters: Berlin, Germany
- No. of offices: 6
- No. of attorneys: over 350 attorneys, including 93 partners (2025)
- Major practice areas: M&A, corporate law, structured finance, dispute resolution
- Revenue: ▲€355.4 million (2023/2024)
- Website: www.hengeler.com

Hengeler Mueller is a globally operating German business law firm. The firm's legal team consists of more than 350 lawyers, including 93 partners, working in offices in Düsseldorf, Frankfurt am Main, Berlin, Munich, Brussels, and London. In addition, the law firm works closely with other European law firms. It has been recognized in the top tier of firms in the fields of mergers & acquisitions, corporate law, capital markets, finance, private equity, structured finance, and dispute resolution.

== History ==
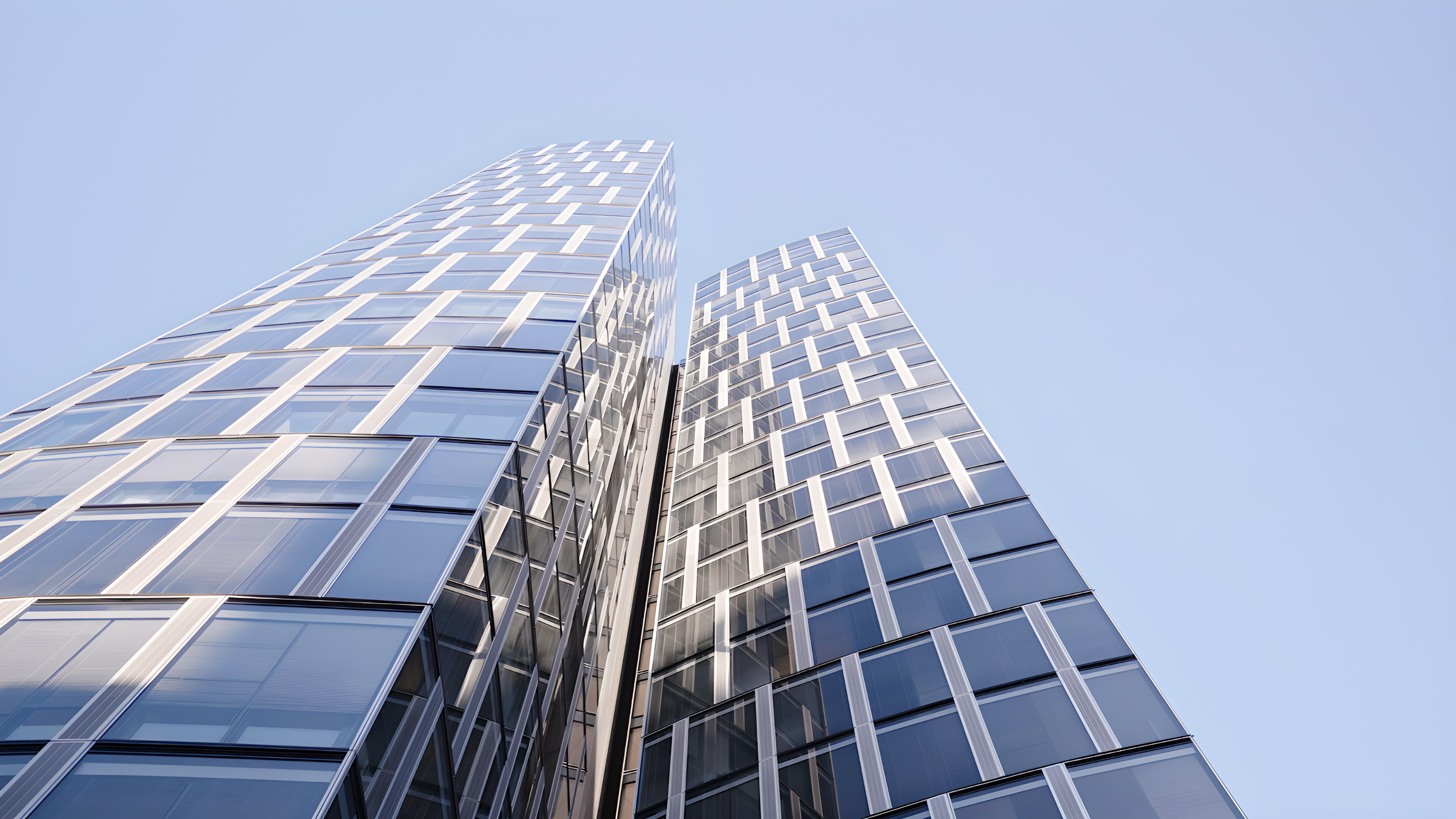
Building WestendDuo, Frankfurt office

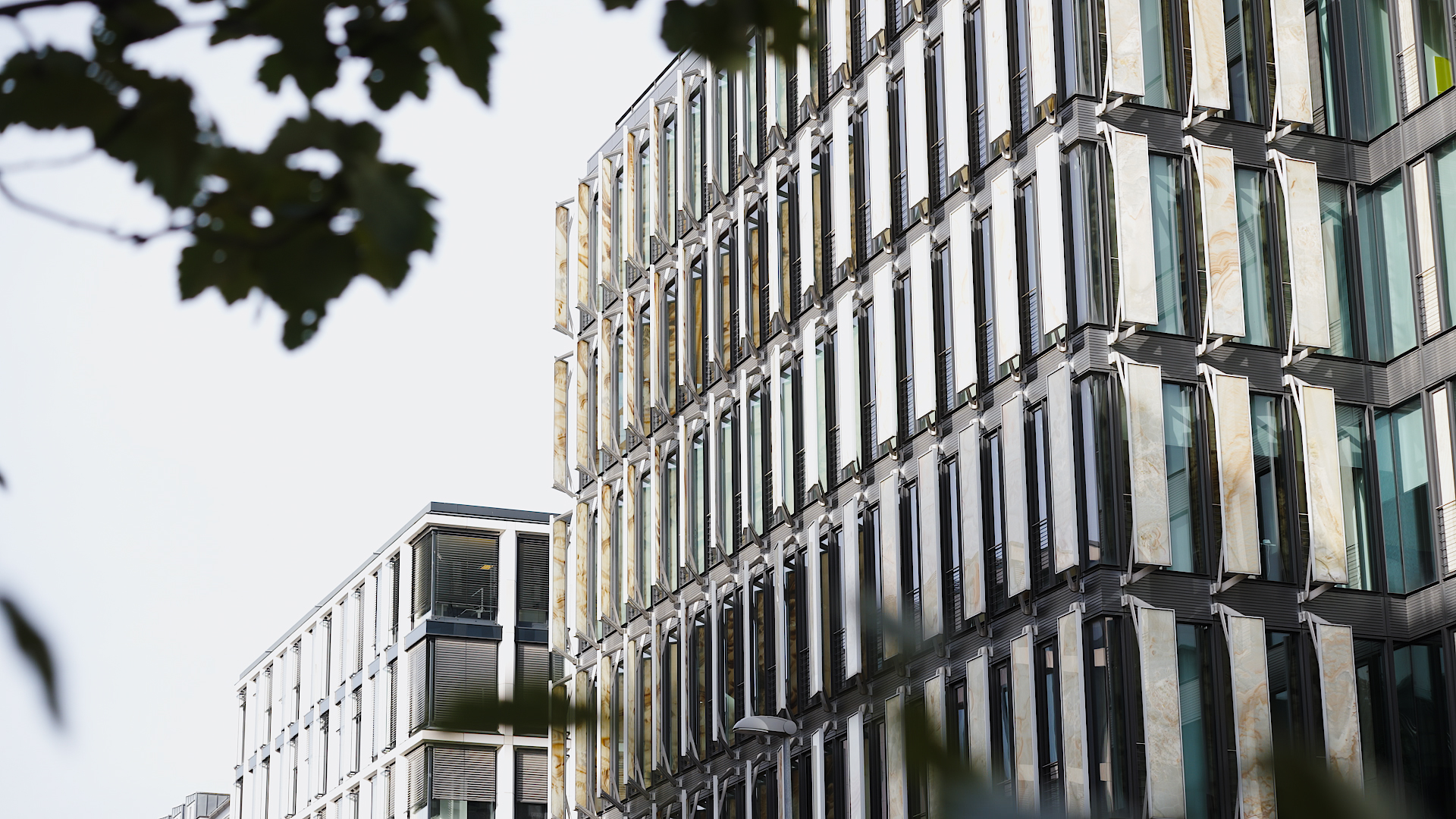
Building Benrather Karree, Düsseldorf office

Hengeler Mueller was established on January 1, 1990, through the merger of the two law firms Hengeler Kurth Wirtz and Mueller Weitzel Weisner. The predecessor firms were a partnership founded in 1947 by Rudolf Mueller in Frankfurt am Main and the law firm of Heinrich Wirtz and Hans Hengeler in Düsseldorf. In the following years, the firms expanded by adding further name partners – Heinz Weitzel and Gerhard Weisner for Mueller Weitzel Weisner and Heinz-Bernd Kurth for Hengeler Kurth Wirtz. Both firms were also active in corporate legal advice, often for representatives of large German banks, insurance companies and industrial corporations.

Following the merger in 1990, Hengeler Mueller established itself as one of the largest domestic business law firms in Germany. In 1998, the firm employed 120 lawyers, including 55 partners, as well as 130 other staff. Later followed an office in London and, in 2006, the opening of the sixth office in Munich. In addition to its existing offices in Düsseldorf and Frankfurt, the firm opened offices in Brussels and Berlin during the 1990s.

The firm was initially structured as a civil law partnership (GbR) and changed its legal form in 2013 to a partnership with limited professional liability (mbB). This change in legal form took place after Hengeler Mueller, together with other business law firms, had been advocating for the creation of the corresponding legal framework since mid-2010.

== Company structure and network ==
As of 2025, Hengeler Mueller employs more than 350 lawyers, including 93 partners. The firm follows a lockstep compensation, under which the remuneration of professionals is based solely on the duration of their affiliation with the firm.

Outside of Germany, the firm maintains offices in Brussels and London. In addition, Hengeler Mueller is a member of an international law firm network. This network includes Slaughter and May (United Kingdom), BonelliErede (Italy), Bredin Prat (France), De Brauw Blackstone Westbroek (the Netherlands) and Uría Menéndez (Spain).

== Areas of focus ==
As a full-service law firm, Hengeler Mueller covers all areas of business law, in particular transactional work in the fields of mergers and acquisitions, financing and capital markets as well as advice in contentious disputes.

The firm is equally active in the areas of corporate law, banking law, antitrust law, insurance law, tax law, employment law, real estate law, restructuring, compliance and internal investigations, data protection law, competition law, public procurement law, and white-collar criminal law.

Hengeler Mueller's clients include, among others, national and international companies from various economic sectors as well as the public sector.

== Notable cases and media reception ==
Since its foundation, Hengeler Mueller has been involved in major proceedings and transactions. In 2024, Klemens Handke described Hengeler Mueller in Business Insider as one of the "largest" and "highest-revenue German business law firms".

- Hengeler Kurtz Mueller advised Texaco on the acquisition of Deutsche Erdöl-Aktiengesellschaft in 1966, the first ever public takeover bid in Germany.
- The law firm represented Deutsche Telekom in its €5.5 billion disposal of cable regions to US-based Liberty Media. In 1996, Hengeler Mueller advised the consortium on the IPO of Deutsche Telekom.
- At the end of the 1990s, the firm advised the newly founded DaimlerChrysler AG on the merger of Daimler-Benz and Chrysler.
- In the early 2000s, Hengeler Mueller served as counsel to Kohlberg Kravis Roberts in its €1.69 billion acquisition of metering and ceramics divisions from Siemens.
- Since 2011, Hengeler Mueller has advised MAN SE in defending against claims for damages related to the European truck cartel.
- In 2012, the firm advised Porsche SE in connection with the integration of Porsche into Volkswagen Group.
- In February 2014, following an extensive period of legal proceedings, the case initiated by the heirs of Leo Kirch against Deutsche Bank ended with a settlement. Hengeler Mueller had advised Deutsche Bank in this damages case. In March 2014, it became known that the Munich public prosecutor's office was conducting an investigation into lawyers from Hengeler Mueller for alleged incitement to make false statements and aiding and abetting fraud, and that the law firm's offices had been searched. The lawyers were accused of having coordinated untrue statements with witnesses in this trial. The investigations against the lawyers were later dropped. In April 2016, members of Deutsche Bank's Executive Board were acquitted in the related trial before the Munich Regional Court.
- From 2015, Hengeler Mueller advised Robert Bosch GmbH in connection with allegations regarding the manipulation of diesel vehicle emissions control (Diesel emissions scandal). Bosch was ordered to pay a fine of €90 million, which, according to Christiane Schiffer in Juve, was a comparatively low amount compared to other emissions cases. Porsche SE and Volkswagen AG were also represented by Hengeler Mueller in 2019 in the course of the VW emissions scandal.
- In 2020, Hengeler Mueller represented Deutsche Lufthansa AG in securing a state aid package worth €9 billion in response to the challenges posed by the COVID-19 pandemic.
- In 2022, the Finnish group Fortum was advised on the conclusion of the state stabilization package for its German subsidiary Uniper. Uniper had encountered financial difficulties as a result of the Russian gas supply stop, leading to the nationalization of the company. Also from 2022, Hengeler Mueller advised the largest group of bondholders of the Adler Group, which at that time was in financial crisis and was to be rescued through restructuring.
- Already in 2020, Hengeler Mueller advised the Siemens group on the transaction involving the spin-off of Siemens Energy and its subsequent IPO. When Siemens Energy needed to be financially stabilized in 2023, Hengeler Mueller advised the group on securing guarantee lines totaling €12 billion and a federal government guarantee.
- In 2024, Hengeler Mueller advised Deutsche Bahn on the sale of its logistics subsidiary DB Schenker to the Danish transport and logistics group DSV for an enterprise value of €14.3 billion.

== Rankings ==
Hengeler Mueller was ranked as one of the three leading German business law firms by the legal specialist publisher Juve in 2024. The British rating agency Chambers and Partners also lists Hengeler Mueller as one of the leading German business law firms (as of 2025).

== Pro bono work ==
Hengeler Mueller is a member of the association Pro Bono Deutschland e. V., based in Frankfurt am Main, which pursues, among other aims, the promotion of free legal advice for non-profit organizations. In the context of such cooperation, Hengeler Mueller advised the International Refugee Assistance Project in 2021 on the establishment of a European subsidiary.
