= Houthoff Buruma The Game =

Houthoff Buruma The Game is a serious game developed in 2010 by Houthoff Buruma, one of the largest law firms in the Netherlands, and Ranj Serious Games. The Game is considered to be the first game to be used in the area of business services. Designed for recruitment purposes, law graduates are challenged to display their skills in the area of corporate acquisitions. On 30 October 2017, Houthoff Buruma changed its name to Houthoff.

== Background ==
Houthoff Buruma The Game was introduced at the World Expo 2010 in Shanghai on May 26, 2010.

== Awards ==
- Winner of 'E-Virtuoses Award', 2011
- Winner of 'SAN Accent' 2011, Category Personnel
- Winner of the 'European Innovative Games Award 2010'
- Winner of the Hubbard One 'Excellence in Legal Marketing Award' 2011

== Gameplay ==
The player represents China Mining & Marine. To meet the unprecedented energy goals of the Chinese government, this state-owned giant has to construct the Panlong Renewable Energy Park within an ambitious time frame. To succeed in such a short time, China Mining & Marine needs six specific vessels equipped with a unique installation technology. However, these six vessels are all in the hands of one company: 't Hoen Marine & Offshore, a century-old Dutch family business that also possesses the latest technology and the essential know-how. China Mining & Marine needs those six vessels as soon as possible and is determined to acquire 't Hoen. The player has 90 minutes to convince enough shareholders to sell their shares and to draft a 'Letter of Intent'.

== Characters ==
- Ding Hong: Senior Member, Chinese Communist Party / President, China Mining & Marine
- Arie 't Hoen jr.: Pater Familias / no longer a shareholder of 't Hoen Marine & Offshore
- Johan 't Hoen: Chief Executive Officer, 't Hoen Marine & Offshore
- Klaas 't Hoen: Chief Technology Officer, 't Hoen Marine & Offshore
- Margreet 't Hoen: Shareholder, 't Hoen Marine & Offshore / not active in the operations of 't Hoen Marine & Offshore
- Yulia Galkinova: Fiancée of Klaas 't Hoen
- Sandra Vrooman: Partner, Corporate Transactions, Houthoff Buruma
- Rebecca Grey: Personal Assistant to Sandra Vrooman
