= Bredin Prat =

French law firm

- Headquarters: Paris, France
- No. of offices: 2
- No. of attorneys: 180 (2017)
- Major practice areas: Corporate (M&A, private equity, capital markets), Litigation and White-Collar Crime, Competition and EU Law, International Arbitration, Employment Law, Financing, Public and Environmental Law, Tax Law, Restructuring and Insolvency
- Date founded: 1966
- Founder: Robert Badinter, Jean-Denis Bredin, Jean-François Prat
- Website: Bredin Prat

Bredin Prat is a French law firm of about 180 lawyers, 45 of whom are partners and 14 are counsels. Founded in 1966, it is one of the largest law firms in Europe. It has offices in Paris and Brussels. Bredin Prat maintains partnerships with BonelliErede (Italy), Cravath, Swaine & Moore (United States), Hengeler Mueller (Germany), Slaughter and May (United Kingdom), De Brauw Blackstone Westbroek (the Netherlands), and Uría Menéndez (Spain).

== Recognition ==
- The Legal 500 ranks Bredin Prat as top-tier in France for M&A, Commercial litigation, White-collar crime, Tax, Insolvency, EU competition and distribution and Employment.
- Chambers & Partners ranks Bredin Prat as Band 1 in France for Corporate/M&A, EU/competition, Litigation, Tax and Restructuring/Insolvency.
