= Lexoo =

Vcode

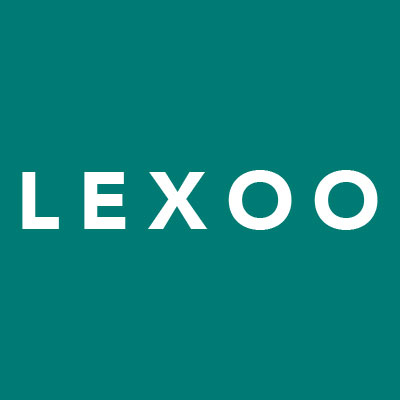
- Company type: Private Company
- Industry: Legal technology
- Founded: June 2014
- Founder: Daniel van Binsbergen; Chris O'Sullivan
- Headquarters: London, United Kingdom
- Products: Legal Services
- Website: www.lexoo.co.uk

Lexoo is a UK-based legal technology company launched in June 2014 with headquarters in London, United Kingdom. Lexoo delivers legal services to companies worldwide through a network of more than 1100 lawyers across 70 countries.

== History ==
Lexoo was founded in June 2014 by Daniel van Binsbergen, a former lawyer at De Brauw Blackstone Westbroek, and Chris O'Sullivan, a developer, having raised $400,000 in seed funding from Forward Partners and Jonathan McKay, the Chairman of JustGiving. In November 2015, Lexoo raised a further $1.3 million in funding from a number of investors, including the London Co-Investment Fund, Duncan Jennings (founder of Vouchercodes.co.uk), Tim Jackson of Lean Investments, Robin Grant (founder of We Are Social) and Forward Partners. In October 2018, Lexoo raised $4.4 million in a Series A round led by Earlybird, with additional financing from Forward Partners and Zoopla general counsel (GC) Ned Staple.

In March 2024, Lexoo was acquired by the Kalexius group.

== Media coverage ==
TechCrunch identified that, compared to other markets, the fees charged by legal practitioners are traditionally non transparent, and considered Lexoo “a classic example of how markets can be made more efficient and transparent by moving them online”.

Forbes described Lexoo as “the democratisation of legal services”, noting that “the participating solicitors know they are quoting in a competitive environment, so they will offer their best price up front, without businesses having to ask for it. All the ingredients of a classic disruptive start-up.”

In June 2015, the Financial Times selected Lexoo as its "Innovation to Watch" and Startups.co.uk listed Lexoo among the top 100 startups in the UK in 2015.

Lexoo has also been featured by PE Hub, Legal Futures, Talk Business Magazine, the Guardian, and Tech City News.

In 2019, Harvard Business School made a case study out of Lexoo, which involved three Harvard professors visiting Lexoo’s London offices and focusing on the decisions needed to start and then grow the company, in particular its decision to refocus from SMEs to the in-house legal market.
