= De Brauw Blackstone Westbroek =

Dutch law firm

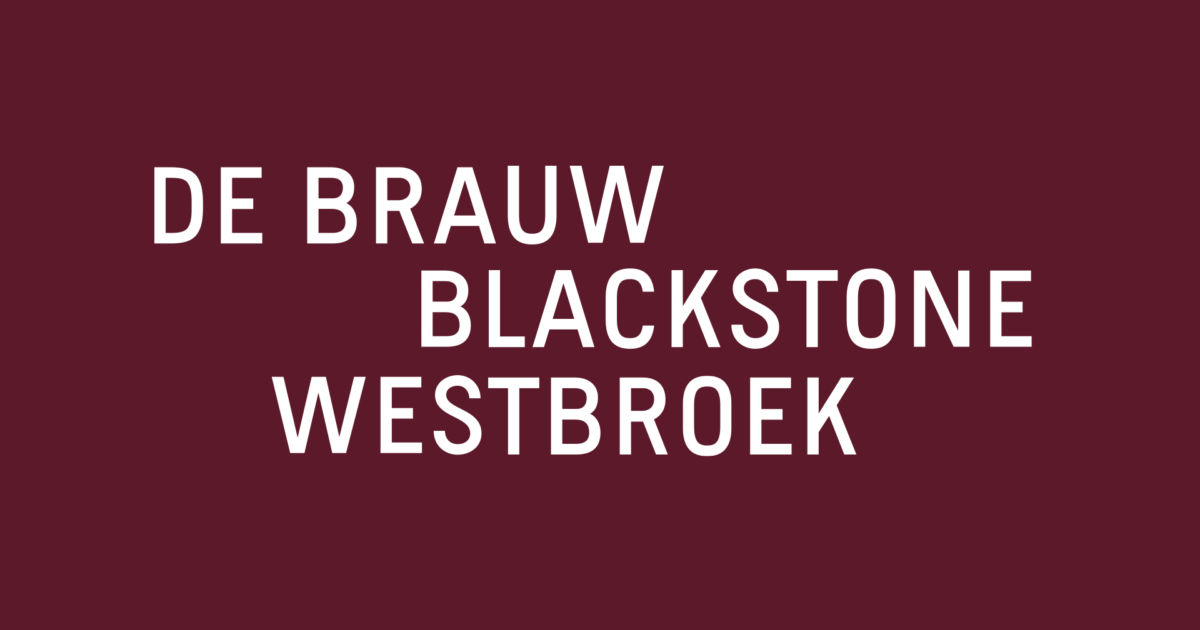
- Headquarters: Amsterdam, Netherlands
- No. of offices: 6
- No. of lawyers: 341
- Major practice areas: General practice
- Revenue: ▲EUR 200.6 million
- Date founded: 1871 (The Hague)
- Company type: N.V.
- Website: www.debrauw.com

De Brauw Blackstone Westbroek N.V. is a Dutch law firm headquartered in Amsterdam with branch offices in Brussels, London, Shanghai and Singapore. The firm has 60 partners and 300 other qualified lawyers. The firm was founded in 1871.

== Areas of practice ==
In 2018, Chambers & Partners ranked De Brauw top tier in twelve practice areas, which is the second highest of any Dutch firm. De Brauw's main practice areas are:

- Arbitration
- Capital Markets
- Competition & Regulation
- Construction
- Corporate Advisory
- Corporate Governance
- Employment & Employee Benefits
- Energy, Infrastructure & Environment
- Finance & Restructuring
- Financial Institutions
- Financial Markets Regulation
- Insolvency
- Insurance
- Intellectual Property
- International trade
- Investment Management
- Litigation
- Mergers & Acquisitions
- Pensions
- Privacy & Data Security
- Private Equity
- Real Estate
- Regulatory & Criminal Enforcement
- Supreme Court Litigation
- Tax

== Recent deals and matters ==
- SBM Offshore settles with Dutch Public Prosecutor's Service over alleged improper payments
- SHV and Nutreco announce a recommended cash offer of EUR 3.5 billion for Nutreco
- IPO Affirmed on NASDAQ
- Imtech sells its ICT division to VINCI
- Klépierre to take over Corio in European mall push
- IPO IMCD on Euronext Amsterdam
- Gilde Buy Out Partners and Parcom Capital to sell Nedschroef to PMC for EUR 325 million
- Ahold reaches agreement in principle to settle Waterbury class action in the United States
- Advising D.E MASTER BLENDERS 1753 in antitrust case against Nestlé
- Advent makes a recommended cash offer for UNIT4

== International connections ==
De Brauw Blackstone Westbroek has been part of a European network of law firms, sometimes called ‘Best Friends’, for a number of years, comprising: Slaughter and May (UK), Bredin Prat (France), Hengeler Mueller (Germany), Uría Menéndez (Spain), BonelliErede (Italy).

== See also ==
- Law firms of the Netherlands
