= Houthoff =

Law firm based in the Netherlands

- Headquarters: Amsterdam, Netherlands
- No. of offices: 5
- No. of attorneys: > 300
- Major practice areas: Corporate / M&A, Banking & Finance, Dispute Resolution, Real Estate
- Key people: Managing partners: Edward de Bock, Gerhard Gispen, Albert Knigge
- Revenue: €106,1m (2012)
- Website: https://www.houthoff.com

Houthoff is a long-established Netherlands-based law firm, headquartered in Amsterdam. With over 300 lawyers worldwide, Houthoff is one of the largest law firms in the Netherlands. Houthoff advises large international corporations on a boardroom level, assisting them in strategic impact matters. Lawyers focus on Dutch and EU legal aspects. Houthoff has offices in Rotterdam, London, Brussels, and New York City, and has representatives in Houston and Singapore serving as communication hubs for cross-border work. Houthoff works on permanent non-exclusive basis with law firms in London and New York City, as well as major firms in other global economic centres.

== Major projects ==
- Advising Siemens on the sale of its stake in joint venture Nokia Siemens Networks to Nokia for €1.7 billion.
- Acting as court-appointed bankruptcy trustee of Lehman Brothers Treasury.
- Advising TPG Capital and Patron Capital on the purchase and restructuring of the distressed portfolio of Opera Finance (Uni-Invest).
- Advising Petrobras on the sale of a stake in Petrobras Oil & Gas, a company controlling Petrobras’ E&P operations in Africa, to BTG Pactual for $1.53 billion.
- Advising BTG Pactual on its IPO and listing on São Paulo stock exchange, raising $1.95bn, and NYSE Euronext Amsterdam.

Houthoff represented Russian interests in the long-running Yukos shareholders v. Russia case. The firm also represented other Russia-linked clients in the past, including Mikhail Fridman's investment vehicle LetterOne as well as several museums seeking the return of Crimean gold and artifacts that were on display in the Netherlands at the time of the annexation of Crimea by the Russian Federation in 2014.

== International connections ==
Houthoff is an exclusive Lex Mundi firm in the Netherlands. Lex Mundi is an association of independent law firms with more than 160 member firms worldwide. Houthoff has a large client base associated with Kremlin interests.

== Locations ==
- Netherlands: Amsterdam, Rotterdam
- Belgium: Brussels
- United Kingdom: London
- United States: New York City, Houston
- Dedicated China Practice
- Singapore

== See also ==
- Law firms of the Netherlands
- Houthoff Buruma The Game, a serious game for recruitment purposes developed by the company.
