= Semple Fraser =

Semple Fraser LLP
- Headquarters: Glasgow, Scotland, United Kingdom
- No. of offices: Three
- Date founded: 1990 (Glasgow)
- Company type: Limited liability partnership
- Dissolved: 2013 (bankruptcy)

Semple Fraser LLP was a Scottish commercial law firm, with over 150 staff, including 21 partners, and offices in Glasgow, Edinburgh and Manchester. It was founded in Glasgow in 1990 and collapsed in 2013.

== History ==
The firm was formed in 1990 and began with 20 staff based in an office in Glasgow city centre. The founding partners – Alister Fraser, Paul Haniford, David Semple and Cesidio di Ciacca – took advantage of the recession in the property industry in the 1990s to double the space they occupied and grow the business. The Edinburgh office opened in 1998. The firm became an LLP in June 2004 and a multinational partnership in July 2005. Semple Fraser opened their first and only English office, in Manchester, during 2009.

In 2010, according to the legal referral site Legal 500, Semple Fraser's real estate and environment teams were first-tier in the Scottish legal market. Chambers, another legal directory, stated in 2011 that Semple Fraser had "the best EU and UK waste law team in Scotland". Vincent Brown, former head of the firm's waste and environment groups, wrote the legal textbook Environmental Pollution Law and Commercial Transactions (2004), which analysed the impact of environmental legislation on commercial transactions.

Semple Fraser entered administration in March 2013, due to difficult economic conditions following the onset of the Great Recession. The bankruptcy resulted in 62 redundancies. Parts of the defunct business were sold to rival firms in Glasgow, Edinburgh, and Manchester - including Maclay Murray and Spens (now part of Dentons), Dundas and Wilson (now part of CMS), and Weightmans.

== Main practice areas ==
Semple Fraser had the following main practice areas:

- Banking & Finance
- Commercial litigation
- Construction
- Corporate & Commercial
- Corporate Recovery & Insolvency
- Employment
- Environment & Pollution
- Intellectual Property
- Planning
- Property Finance
- Real Estate
- Tax
