= I-Bankers Direct =

I-Bankers Direct operates an online funding platform that provides accredited individual investors with the ability to evaluate and invest in early-stage companies. The platform provides access to video presentations, offering documents, management conference calls, company slide decks and other decision-making support.

The company is headquartered in New York City, and maintains offices in Palo Alto, California and Lugano, Switzerland. It was founded in 2012 by entrepreneurs and investment banking professionals Mike McCrory and John Kallassy with the goal of transforming the process of investing in growth-stage companies.
