= Stibbe (law firm) =

International law firm

- Headquarters: Amsterdam, Brussels, Luxembourg
- No. of offices: 6
- No. of attorneys: over 350
- Major practice areas: General commercial practice
- Date founded: 1911
- Company type: Partnership
- Website: www.stibbe.com

Stibbe is a Benelux full-service law firm with an internationally oriented commercial practice. Its primary offices are located in Amsterdam, Brussels and Luxembourg and the firm has a branch office in London.

Stibbe's business covers administrative and public law, corporate & finance, dispute resolution, employment & pensions, EU and national competition law, intellectual property, information technology, planning & environment and tax law. Its clients range from multinational corporations to state organisations and other public authorities. They represent a broad range of activities including financial institutions (banking, investment funds, private equity), real estate, industry, retail, logistics, technology, media and telecommunications.

== History ==
Stibbe's story began over a century ago when its two founders established law firms in their respective countries. David. W. Stibbe started a firm in Amsterdam in 1911, and Henri Simont Sr., established a firm in Belgium in the early part of the 20th century. The Dutch part of the firm was founded in 1911 by H.W. Stibbe. The Belgian part of Stibbe was established by Henri Simont sr. In 1991, Stibbe, Blaisse & De Jong in Amsterdam merged with Simont & Simont in Brussels and became Stibbe & Simont, one of the most prominent law firms in the Benelux. After merging with the Paris-based Monahan & Duhot in 1993, the firm was renamed Stibbe Simont Monahan Duhot. A few years later, the firm's name had simply become Stibbe. Stibbe's Luxembourg office was set up in 2010. Today, Stibbe has main offices in Amsterdam, Brussels and Luxembourg and branch offices in London.

The Brussels office won in 2014 the Chambers Europe Award for Excellence for Belgium and in 2015 the Belgian Law Firm of the Year Award by IFLR1000. In 2018, both the Dutch and the Belgian office were awarded the Chambers Law Firm of the Year Award.

The British law firm Herbert Smith had a partnership with Stibbe and the German firm Gleiss Lutz until 2011; Herbert Smith's intention was to merge with the other two firms, but they refused its overtures.

== Offices ==
- Amsterdam (1911)
- Brussels (1966)
- Luxembourg (2010)
- London (1994)

== See also ==
- Law firms of the Netherlands
