= Herbert Smith =

Multinational law firm

Herbert Smith LLP
- Headquarters: London, United Kingdom
- No. of offices: 13
- No. of lawyers: 1,300
- Major practice areas: General practice
- Revenue: US$1.26 billion/£800 million (2013/14)
- Profit per equity partner: £840,000 (2011/12)
- Date founded: 1882 (London)
- Company type: Limited liability partnership
- Dissolved: 1 October 2012
- Website: www.herbertsmith.com

Herbert Smith LLP was a multinational law firm headquartered in London, United Kingdom. The firm was founded in the City of London in 1882 by Norman Herbert Smith and merged with the Australian law firm Freehills on 1 October 2012, forming Herbert Smith Freehills. At the time of the merger it had 13 offices across Europe, the Middle East and Asia, around 240 partners and 1,300 fee-earners. It was regarded as forming part of the "Silver Circle" of leading British law firms.

== History ==
Herbert Smith was founded by Norman Herbert Smith in 1882. Edward Walker-Arnott took over as senior partner in 1992.

In 2000 Herbert Smith formed an alliance with German law firm Gleiss Lutz. Herbert Smith, Gleiss Lutz and the Dutch law firm Stibbe formed a tripartite alliance in 2002.

In April 2009 Herbert Smith opened an office in Madrid, Spain after recruiting three partners from Linklaters.

In 2009, Herbert Smith had total revenues of £444 million and profits per equity partner (PEP) of £845,000. In 2010, the firm's revenues were £450 million and PEP was £862,000.

In November 2010 Herbert Smith announced that it would be opening an office in Belfast, Northern Ireland, to perform litigation due diligence tasks.

In November 2011 partners at Gleiss Lutz and Stibbe voted against a merger with Herbert Smith. The alliance between Herbert Smith, Gleiss Lutz and Stibbe subsequently ended on 31 December 2011.

In February 2012, Herbert Smith entered merger discussion with the Australian law firm Freehills. Partners at both firms voted in favour of the merger in June 2012. The firm created, Herbert Smith Freehills, subsequently merged with American law firm Kramer Levin to become Herbert Smith Freehills Kramer in June 2025.

== Practice ==
After specialising in company flotations and advising mining companies in the early part of the 20th century, by the time of its merger with Freehills, Herbert Smith's practice was dominated by litigation and corporate work (M&A and equity capital markets in particular), with other practices including finance, real estate, energy, and competition.
