= Loyens & Loeff =

Law firm

- Headquarters: Rotterdam, Netherlands
- No. of offices: 11 in 10 countries
- No. of attorneys: 497
- No. of employees: 1500
- Major practice areas: Law and tax
- Key people: Harmen Holtrop (Managing Partner/Member of the Executive Board), Roderik Beckers (Member of the Executive Board, Partner)
- Revenue: € 365 mln (2022)
- Date founded: 2000
- Company type: N.V.
- Website: www.loyensloeff.com

Loyens & Loeff N.V. (L&L) is an international law and tax firm headquartered in Rotterdam. It has offices in the Netherlands, Belgium, Luxembourg and Switzerland (home markets), as well as representation offices in major international financial centres. It is ranked as the second firm in the European 100 ranking by The Lawyer. The firm has about 1.500 employees, including more than 800 tax and legal advisers. Loyens & Loeff and its professionals regularly appear in national and regional rankings in the top tiers. Loyens & Loeff was presented with the "Law firm of the year: Benelux" award by The Lawyer in its European Awards 2021.

== History ==
Loyens & Loeff was created in 2000 through a merger between the tax law firm Loyens & Volkmaars and part of the law firm Loeff Claeys Verbeke.

== See also ==
- Law firms of the Netherlands
