= Lesley Bamberger =

Dutch billionaire, real estate developer and football administrator (born 1965)

- Born: Lesley Bamberger; 3 June 1965 (age 61); Amsterdam, Netherlands
- Occupations: Property developer, football administrator
- Known for: Owner of Kroonenberg Groep; Chairman of AFC Ajax Supervisory Board; Former owner of Almere City FC
- Title: Owner, Kroonenberg Groep
- Board member of: AFC Ajax (Supervisory Board)
- Relatives: Steven Berghuis (son-in-law)

Lesley Bamberger (born 3 June 1965) is a Dutch billionaire businessman, real estate developer, and football administrator. He is the owner and chief executive officer of Kroonenberg Groep, a privately held real estate company founded by his maternal grandfather, Jacob Kroonenberg.

In football administration, Bamberger served as the owner of Almere City FC for 15 years, overseeing their financial stabilization and historic first promotion to the Eredivisie in 2023. In March 2026, he was appointed Chairman of the Supervisory Board of AFC Ajax, having been a member of the club's association since 2009.

== Early life and background ==
Bamberger was born on 3 June 1965 in Amsterdam. He is the grandson of real estate developer Jacob "Jaap" Kroonenberg (1921–1996). Kroonenberg, who was Jewish, survived the Holocaust by jumping from a deportation train with his sister, though his parents and six of his ten siblings were killed in Nazi concentration camps. Kroonenberg initially built a business in textile trading and manufacturing on Weesperzijde before shifting focus to real estate investments in Amsterdam during the 1960s.

Bamberger attended a boarding school in Switzerland and began his career at age 17 as a salesperson at The Society Shop on Koningsplein in Amsterdam. After completing internships at international real estate firms, he joined Kroonenberg Groep as a commercial associate in 1986.

== Business career ==
Following his grandfather's death in 1996, Bamberger inherited Kroonenberg Groep and assumed management of the company. Under his leadership, the firm modernized its commercial holdings, executed long-term redevelopment projects, and expanded its portfolio across retail, industrial, and residential sectors in the Netherlands and the United States. A prominent project under his direction was the multi-year redevelopment of "The Bank" on Rembrandtplein, which also housed the Ajax Experience Center from 2010 to 2013.

By 2026, Kroonenberg Groep's property portfolio was valued at over €3 billion. Bamberger's personal net worth was estimated at €2.1 billion by Quote magazine, placing him 21st on the Quote 500 list of wealthiest Dutch citizens.

In 2021, Bamberger bought out his cousin Gordon F.'s 18.5% equity stake in Kroonenberg Groep for €270 million, effectively severing all financial ties between the family enterprise and his cousin following the latter's involvement in criminal offences.

== Football administration ==
=== Almere City FC ===
Bamberger initially became involved with Almere City FC (then known as FC Omniworld) as a corporate sponsor and owner of the club's stadium through Kroonenberg Groep. When the club faced bankruptcy in 2010–2011, Bamberger acquired full ownership to protect the stadium asset and stabilize the organisation.

During his 15-year ownership, Bamberger implemented a sustainable financial model, covering operational deficits while guiding the club toward self-sufficiency. The club achieved its first-ever promotion to the Eredivisie at the end of the 2022–23 season via the promotion/relegation play-offs.

To avoid potential conflicts of interest prior to joining the board of AFC Ajax, Bamberger agreed to sell 100% of his shares in Almere City FC to Japanese multinational company Yanmar, a long-time club partner. The takeover was finalized on 31 October 2025.

=== AFC Ajax ===
Bamberger has been a lifelong supporter of AFC Ajax, having attended matches at De Meer Stadion with his grandfather from a young age. Jaap Kroonenberg maintained close relationships with Ajax directors and co-founded a youth development foundation with Johan Cruyff in 1987. Bamberger officially joined the Ajax association in 2009.

In late 2025, following administrative restructuring at the club, Bamberger was nominated for a position on the Supervisory Board by the board council, supported by former Ajax director Arie van Eijden. On 9 March 2026, he was formally appointed Chairman of the Supervisory Board, succeeding interim chairman Dirk Anbeek.

== Personal life and civic activities ==
Bamberger resides in Amsterdam. His daughter is in a relationship with Dutch international footballer Steven Berghuis, who plays for AFC Ajax.

In civic life, Bamberger co-donated 5,500 solar panels valued at €4 million alongside ING to mark Amsterdam's 750th anniversary in 2025, assisting in the sustainability of public buildings. He is also involved with FC Centrum, an initiative aimed at revitalizing Amsterdam's city centre.
