= Freehills =

Former Australian commercial law firm

- Headquarters: MLC Centre; Sydney, Australia
- No. of offices: 5
- No. of lawyers: 800+ lawyers and 190+ partners
- No. of employees: 1,750+
- Major practice areas: Corporate and commercial
- Key people: Gavin Bell, CEO/Managing Partner
- Revenue: $565 million (2011-12)
- Date founded: 1852
- Company type: Partnership
- Dissolved: 30 September 2012 to form Herbert Smith Freehills
- Website: www.freehills.com

Freehills was a commercial law firm operating in the Asia Pacific region. It was one of the Big Six Australian law firms. In 2012 it merged with Herbert Smith to become Herbert Smith Freehills.

== History ==
The firm's predecessors include the practices Clarke & Moule in Melbourne (1853), Stephen Henry Parker in Perth (1868), Bernard Austin Freehill in Sydney (1871) and John Nicholson in Perth (1896).

The Sydney firm became Freehill Hollingdale & Page in 1947 and began to grow under the direction of partner Brian Page, who took the firm into corporate and commercial practice within Australia and internationally. Page was also notable for his open employment policy, hiring Catholics and Jews when many other firms would not.

In 1978 Freehill Hollingdale & Page became the first major Australian law firm to appoint a female partner. In 1979 Muir Williams Nicholson & Co, Perth signed an agreement with Freehill Hollingdale & Page to form Australia's first national law partnership.

In 2000, the state Freehill Hollingdale & Page partnerships became a single national partnership and was rebranded Freehills.

In 2012, the firm had over 800 lawyers and over 190 partners. On 1 October 2012 Freehills merged with international law firm Herbert Smith to form Herbert Smith Freehills with a single global equity partnership.

== Operations ==
=== Offices ===
Freehills had Australian offices in Sydney, Melbourne, Perth and Brisbane; and an office in Singapore. It was associated with the firm Soemadipradja & Taher in Indonesia, Frasers Law Company in Vietnam, and TransAsia Lawyers in China.

=== Pro bono services ===
Freehills had a pro bono program which, under the leadership of the late Keith Steele, saw the establishment of the Shopfront Youth Legal Centre in Kings Cross.

The firm seconded solicitors to a number of community legal centres and services including the Public Interest Law Clearing House in Victoria, the Kingsford Legal Centre.

== Greenwoods & Freehills ==
In 1985, Greenwoods & Freehills was established in Sydney as a specialist tax practice when accounting firm Greenwood Challoner and Freehill, Hollingdale & Page tax practice merged. Offices opened in Melbourne (2005) and Perth (2012) In 2008, the Greenwoods & Freehills merged with Shaddick & Spence to create Australia's largest specialist tax practice.
