= Keith Steele =

Personal information
- Full name: Howard Keith Chillingworth Steele
- Born: 6 April 1951; Epsom, Auckland, New Zealand
- Died: 7 June 2009 (aged 58); Berrima, New South Wales, Australia
- Batting: Right-handed
- Bowling: Right-arm medium

Domestic team information
- Years: Team
- 1970–1972: Cambridge University
- 1971–1972: Cambridgeshire
- 1974/75: Auckland

Career statistics
Competition	First-class	List A
Matches	26	6
Runs scored	711	43
Batting average	19.75	7.16
100s/50s	1/3	0/0
Top score	103*	25
Balls bowled	2,681	231
Wickets	30	2
Bowling average	42.53	70.50
5 wickets in innings	0	0
10 wickets in match	0	0
Best bowling	4/71	1/40
Catches/stumpings	13/–	2/–
- Source: Cricinfo, 25 April 2011

Howard Keith Chillingworth Steele (6 April 1951 – 7 June 2009) was a New Zealand cricketer, notable legal practitioner and author. In cricket, Steele was a right-handed batsman who bowled right-arm medium pace. He was born in Epsom, Auckland.

== Cricket ==
Steele won a scholarship to Cambridge University via the Girdlers Scholarship programme, given then to the brightest students in New Zealand. Steele studied law at the university. While there Steele played cricket for the university. His first-class debut for the university against Kent. He played first-class cricket for the university from 1970 to 1972, which amounted to 20 first-class matches. He also played a single first-class match for a combined Oxford and Cambridge Universities team against the touring Australians. He scored 662 runs at a batting average of 24.51 for the university, with three half centuries and a single century high score of 103*. His highest score, which was also his highest first-class score, came against Sussex in 1972. With the ball he took 16 wickets at a bowling average of 52.56, with best figures of 3/16.

It was in 1972 that Steele made his debut in List A cricket for the university against Warwickshire in the 1972 Benson & Hedges Cup. He played three further List A matches for the university in that season's competition. Steele received his Cambridge Blue in cricket, as well as in rugby union which he played for the university. Having played a single Minor Counties Championship match for Cambridgeshire in 1971 against Shropshire, Steele played a single List A match for the county in the 1972 Gillette Cup against Buckinghamshire.

Upon returning to New Zealand, Steele played for Auckland, making his debut for the team in a List A fixture against Wellington in December 1974. This was his final List A match. Later in December 1974, he made his first-class debut for Auckland against Central Districts. He played four further first-class matches up to January 1975, with his final fixture coming against Northern Districts. Steele had a more successful time with the ball for Auckland, taking 14 wickets at an average of 26.71, with best figures of 4/71.

== Legal career ==
Steele spent four years with Crown Solicitors in Auckland, a role in which he advised the New Zealand Government. It was during this period that he met his future wife, Margaret L’Estrange, an Australian. After getting married, he moved to Sydney, Australia. It was there that he joined the legal firm Freehills in 1977. Twenty years later he was made the Sydney Chairman and a senior partner of the firm. Steele helped oversee the firm's transformation from a federation to a fully integrated national firm, which was achieved in 2000. From the years 2005 to 2008, he was the national Head of Litigation. He played a key role in establishing Freehills' pro bono programme in Sydney. He also helped orchestrate Freehills becoming a founding member of the Public Interest Law Clearing House. Steele served as a director of that body for nearly 10 years from its inception.

Outside of the legal firm, Steele served on the Administrative Law Committee of the New South Wales Law Society, the Law Council of Australia and as Chairman of the Customs Law Committee. He had also served on the International Trade and Business Committee of the Law Council and had previously been a member of the subcommittee on trade for the International Bar Association and a past vice-chairman of Committee O (international litigation) of the same organisation. In 1992, he helped set up the Shopfront Youth Legal Centre in Kings Cross, Sydney. He was also an author on legal matters, writing and contributing to many books.

Steele died suddenly on 7 June 2009, in Berrima, New South Wales. He was survived by his wife and three children.
