= Slaughter and May =

London headquartered multinational law firm

- Headquarters: London, United Kingdom
- No. of offices: 4
- No. of lawyers: Approximately 649
- No. of employees: Approximately 1,400
- Major practice areas: General practice
- Key people: Roland Turnill (Senior Partner); David Johnson (Managing Partner), Jill Hoseason (Chief Operating Officer)
- Revenue: Undisclosed, est. £654.0 million (2023/24)
- Profit per equity partner: Undisclosed, est. £2.9 million (2023/24)
- Company type: General partnership
- Website: slaughterandmay.com

Slaughter and May is a British law firm headquartered in London, England. Founded in 1889, it has offices in Beijing, Brussels and Hong Kong in addition to London. The firm is a member of the "Magic Circle", a group of leading London-based multinational law firms.

== History ==
Slaughter and May was founded on 1 January 1889 by William Capel Slaughter and William May, both previously of Ashurst Morris Crisp (later Ashurst). The firm's first office was located at 18 Austin Friars in the City of London. In 1974, the firm opened an office in Hong Kong, being the first London law firm to establish a presence there. During the 1980s and 1990s, the firm acted on a number of privatisations in the United Kingdom, including those of British Airways, British Gas and British Steel Corporation.

In 2002, Slaughter and May moved to its current London office at One Bunhill Row. Slaughter and May closed its New York office in September 2004 and its Singapore office in October 2004, instead referring its U.S. work to Wall Street firms and its Southeast Asia work to the Australian firm of Allens Arthur Robinson. In December 2005, Slaughter and May agreed to cede its Paris office to the French law firm Bredin Prat. In 2009, the firm opened an office in Beijing, China, to focus mainly on M&A and outbound and inbound investment.

In comparison to other Magic Circle firms, Slaughter and May has a minimal overseas presence. Its international practice largely relies on relationships with local law firms in other countries, many of which themselves have minimal overseas presence, and thus do not compete with Slaughter and May. These closely associated firms have included Clayton Utz, Corrs Chambers Westgarth and Gilbert + Tobin in Australia; Bell Gully in New Zealand; BonelliErede, Bredin Prat, De Brauw Blackstone Westbroek, Hengeler Mueller and Uría Menéndez in continental Europe; Shin & Kim and Kim & Chang in South Korea; and three of the Big Four law firms in Japan.

== Operations ==
Unlike most major UK law firms which operate as limited liability partnerships (LLPs), Slaughter and May remains a traditional general partnership. As a result, the firm is not required to publish public financial accounts, and its precise financial performance remains undisclosed. Despite this lack of official data, the firm is widely believed to be one of the most profitable in London. In 2024, the Financial Times estimated the firm's profit per equity partner (PEP) to be approximately £4 million, a figure that would place it ahead of its "Magic Circle" rivals and comparable to elite US firms. Other industry sources, such as The Times and Legal Cheek, have estimated the firm's PEP to be between £3.5 million and £4 million in recent years, though these figures remain speculative.

In Brussels, its practice areas are competition, financial regulation, data protection, as well as trade issues raised by Brexit.

== Carillion collapse ==
In May 2018, a report by a joint inquiry of members of the UK parliament criticized the firm for billing more than £8 million for legal advice to Carillion from when its dire financial position became clear in May 2017 to its eventual collapse in January 2018. Members of parliament said that "names such as Slaughter and May, Lazard, Morgan Stanley and EY were brandished by the board as a badge of credibility. But the appearance of prominent advisers proves nothing other than the willingness of the board to throw money at a problem and the willingness of advisory firms to accept generous fees". The report added that "by the end, a whole suite of advisers, including an array of law firms, were squeezing fee income out of what remained of the company. £6.4m disappeared on the last working day alone as the directors pleaded for a taxpayer bailout". Rachel Reeves, the Labour MP who chaired the Commons business committee, said that after the accountancy firms "it was Carillion's legal advisers who took the big payouts in the company's dying days".

== Notable clients and cases ==
- During the 2008 financial crisis, the firm advised HM Treasury with recapitalising and stabilising UK Banks.
- The firm advised New England Sports Ventures (now Fenway Sports Group) in their £300m takeover of Liverpool F.C. in 2010.
- The firm advised GlaxoSmithKline on its high-profile joint venture with Novartis. The transaction received the 2015 Deal of the Year award by Financial News.
- The firm advised the now liquidated British multinational construction company Carillion on asset sales, rescue bids and restructuring in 2017–18.
- In 2019, the firm advised Prudential plc and M&G plc on the demerger of M&G from Prudential.
- During the COVID-19 pandemic, the firm advised HM Treasury on the government's emergency corporate covid financing facility (CCFF). The CCFF is intended to purchase commercial paper, a debt instrument, from companies in order to boost their liquidity.
- The firm led the transactions involved in the privatisation and delisting of Daily Mail and General Trust from the London Stock Exchange in December 2021 and January 2022 by its owner, the 4th Viscount Rothermere.

== Notable lawyers ==
- Giles Henderson
- Ivo Stourton
- Chris Jenkins
- Seema Kennedy
- Charles Randell
- David Green

== See also ==
- List of largest law firms by profits per partner
