= Gleiss Lutz =

German business law firm

- Headquarters: Stuttgart, Germany
- No. of offices: 8
- Offices: Berlin, Düsseldorf, Frankfurt am Main, Hamburg, Munich, Stuttgart, Brussels and London
- No. of lawyers: 400 lawyers, including 92 partners
- Major practice areas: General practice
- Key people: Ralf Morshäuser, Johann Wagner (Co-Managing Partners)
- Revenue: €318.9 million (2025)
- Date founded: 1949 (Stuttgart)
- Website: www.gleisslutz.com/en

Gleiss Lutz Hootz Hirsch, frequently referred to as Gleiss Lutz, is a business law firm headquartered in Stuttgart, Germany. It is one of Germany's largest law firms, with eight offices worldwide in Berlin, Düsseldorf, Frankfurt, Hamburg, Munich, Stuttgart, Brussels and London. The firm formerly had offices in Prague. Gleiss Lutz is a full-service business law firm and covers, amongst others, legal areas including corporate law, mergers & acquisitions, competition and antitrust law, labour and employment law as well as litigation and arbitration. Additionally, the firm offers industry-specific groups such as automotive, healthcare or energy.

== History ==
The firm was founded on 1 April 1949 by Alfred Gleiss, a lawyer in Stuttgart, as an office for decartelisation and competition issues in Stuttgart. In 1956, Helmuth Lutz joined the firm, shortly after the arrival of Christian Hootz and Martin Hirsch. Since 1962, the firm has borne the official name Gleiss Lutz Hootz Hirsch (short: Gleiss Lutz), which is still valid today.

== International ==
Since 2002, Gleiss Lutz formed a close alliance with British law firm Herbert Smith and Dutch-Belgian firm Stibbe. Herbert Smith put an end to the alliance in 2011, after Gleiss Lutz and Stibbe refused to enter into merger talks. As an independent firm, Gleiss Lutz works with a non-exclusive network of international independent firms worldwide. Gleiss Lutz works closely with three other independent European law firms (Chiomenti in Italy, Cuatrecasas Gonçalves Pereira in Spain and Portugal and Gide Loyrette Nouel in France) within a European Network. In 2025, the European Network was integrated into the existing international law firm network. Furthermore, Gleiss Lutz internationally works with firms such as Stibbe (Benelux), Slaughter and May (UK) or Cravath, Swaine & Moore (USA).

== See also ==
- Arved Deringer
