= BonelliErede =

Italian law firm

- Headquarters: Milan, Italy
- No. of offices: Eight
- No. of lawyers: Over 500
- Major practice areas: General practice
- Key people: Stefano Simontacchi (Chairman); Andrea Carta Mantiglia (Managing Partner)
- Revenue: Approximately €200 million (2020)
- Date founded: 1999 (Milan, Genoa and Brussels)
- Company type: Associazione tra professionisti
- Website: www.belex.com

BonelliErede is an Italian law firm. It was formed in 1999 when the Genoa-based Bonelli e Associati merged with the Milan-based Erede e Associati and the Brussels-based Pappalardo e Associati.

== Legacy firms ==
Bonelli e Associati was founded in 1996 by Franco Bonelli, an attorney in M&A and Litigation and Professor of Corporate Law at the University of Genoa.

Erede e Associati, founded in 1995, was led by Sergio Erede, a graduate of the University of Milan and Harvard Law School. He had been previously associated with Sullivan & Cromwell and Hale & Dorr, now known as WilmerHale.

Pappalardo e Associati was founded in 1992 by Aurelio Pappalardo, a graduate of the Università Cattolica del Sacro Cuore and the University of Chicago, who had previously worked at the Milan office of Jones Day.

== Merger ==
The three-way merger was largely a result of market pressure during a period of rapid change in the Italian legal sector as international (mostly American and British) law firms such as Clifford Chance, and Shearman & Sterling actively sought to expand their existing operations, or open offices in Italy. The merger was essentially a flanking operation that forced foreign firms to concentrate their energies on mergers with smaller Italian firms or to acquire specific teams.

In May 2019, BonelliErede announced the integration with Lombardi e Associati, one of the leading Italian independent law firms in litigation and corporate law. The integration came into force in July 2019.

The firm is now managed by a Board of Directors that is made up of 9 partners, including the Chairman (Stefano Simontacchi) and the Managing Partner (Andrea Carta Mantiglia). In October 2020, beLab, BonelliErede's Alternative Legal Service Provider, gained its own autonomy and became a corporation.

== Name ==
In July 2015, the firm changed its name to BonelliErede.
