= Theodore M. Pomeroy =

American politician (1824–1905)

Theodore Medad Pomeroy
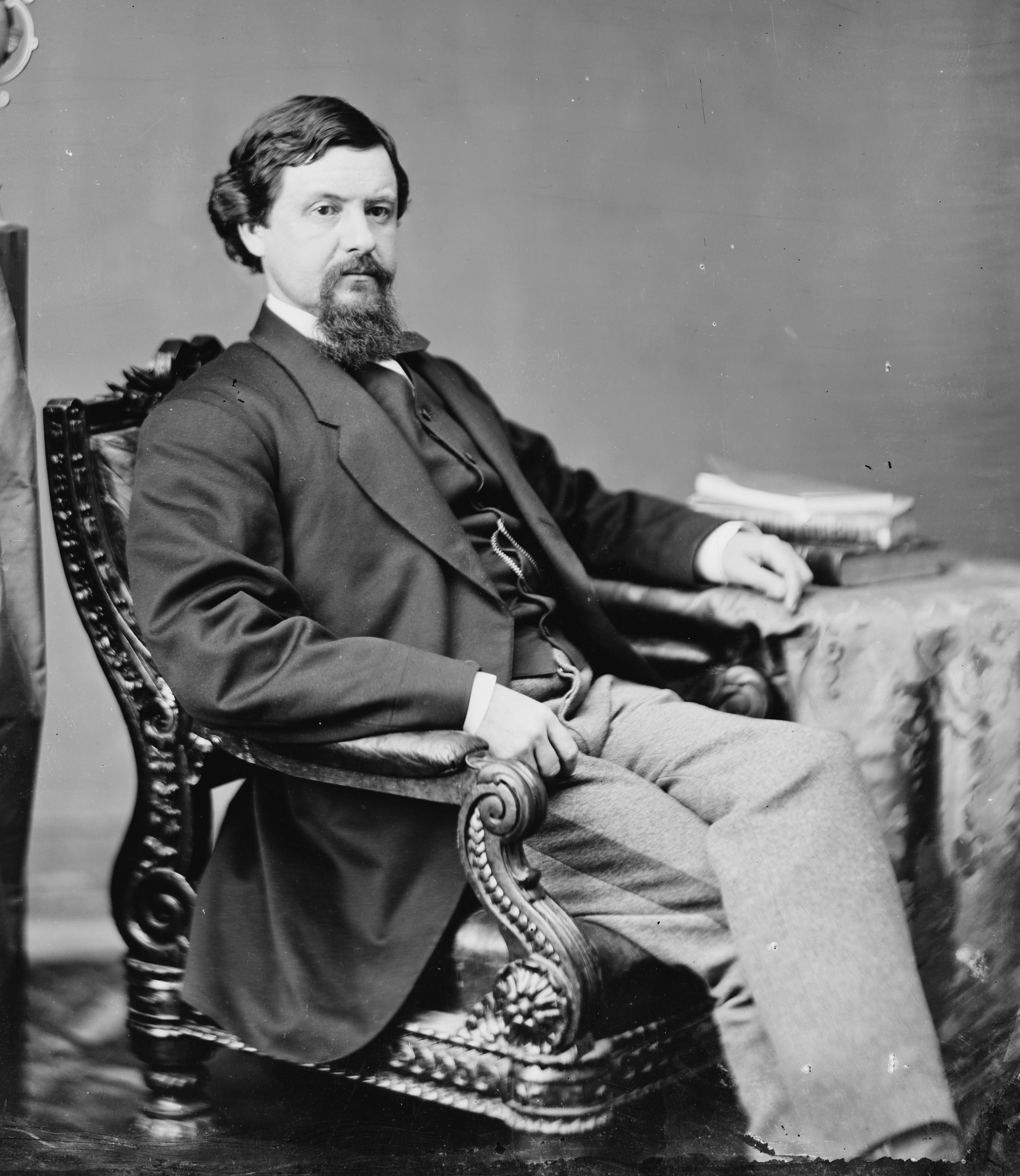

26th Speaker of the United States House of Representatives
- In office March 3, 1869 – March 4, 1869
- Preceded by: Schuyler Colfax
- Succeeded by: James G. Blaine

Leader of the House Republican Conference
- In office March 3, 1869 – March 4, 1869
- Preceded by: Schuyler Colfax
- Succeeded by: James G. Blaine

Member of the U.S. House of Representatives from New York
- In office March 4, 1861 – March 3, 1869
- Preceded by: Martin Butterfield
- Succeeded by: George W. Cowles
- Constituency: 25th district (1861–1863); 24th district (1863–1869)

Member of the New York State Senate from the 25th district
- In office January 1, 1878 – December 31, 1879
- Preceded by: William B. Woodin
- Succeeded by: Dennis McCarthy

Personal details
- Born: December 31, 1824 Cayuga, New York, U.S.
- Died: March 23, 1905 (aged 80) Auburn, New York, U.S.
- Party: Republican (1860–1869)
- Other political affiliations: Whig (1847–1860)
- Spouse: Elizabeth Leitch Watson (m. 1855; died 1892)
- Children: 5
- Education: Monroe Academy
- Alma mater: Hamilton College
- Profession: Attorney

Theodore Medad Pomeroy (December 31, 1824 – March 23, 1905) was an American businessman and politician from New York who served as the 26th speaker of the United States House of Representatives for one day, from March 3, 1869, to March 4, 1869, the shortest American speakership term. He represented New York's 24th congressional district in the United States House of Representatives from 1861 to 1869. He also served as the mayor of Auburn, New York, from 1875 to 1876, and in the New York State Senate from 1878 to 1879.

== Early life and education ==
Theodore Medad Pomeroy was born on December 31, 1824. He spent his childhood in Elbridge, New York, where he went to live when he was nine years old.

He was educated at the Monroe Academy and at 15, entered Hamilton College as a junior. He graduated in 1842 at age 17 and was ranked in the first division of 6 in a class of 24.

== Career ==
=== Legal career ===
In May 1843, at the age of 18, he left his parents' home in Cayuga and moved to Auburn, where he entered the firm of Beach & Underwood as a law student. William H. Seward was counsel for the firm as he had just finished serving as the Governor of New York from 1838 to 1842. Christopher Morgan and Samuel Blatchford, who later became an Associate Justice of the Supreme Court of the United States, became associated with the firm. On May 23, 1846, he was admitted to practice as an attorney in the state of New York.

=== Political career ===
In 1847, he was elected by the Whig Party as clerk of Auburn and in 1851, he was nominated by the Whigs and was elected district attorney. He was reelected again in 1853 and served a second term. At the end of his second term he was chosen to be a Member of the New York Assembly by the Republicans to represent the second district of Cayuga and served in the legislature in 1857 but declined renomination.

In September 1860, he was nominated and elected by the Republican Party to represent the 25th congressional district, composed of the counties of Cayuga and Wayne, in the House of Representatives. On July 4, 1861, he took his seat at the extra session of the 37th Congress convened by President Abraham Lincoln, right after the start of the Civil War. He was referred to as the youngest-looking member on the floor by Washington newspaper correspondents, who described him as follows:

Mr. Pomeroy of Auburn is small in stature, with keen black eyes, a peculiarly expressive countenance and somewhere near as smart as chain lightning, at least when he deals with lower law Democracy. He is one of the most energetic and effective debaters in the House and brimful to running over with that kind of Republicanism which is found in the now somewhat antiquated document known as the Declaration of Independence. The lions of buccaneer Democracy fare hard when they fall into his hands and he occasionally handles certain old fogy Republicans without gloves.

He was nominated by acclamation in 1862, 1864, and 1866 from the 24th congressional district which comprised the counties of Cayuga, Wayne and Seneca. On March 3, 1869, Pomeroy's final full day in office came to a close with the 40th Congress.

==== One-day Speakership (1869) ====
Schuyler Colfax, who was to be sworn into office as vice president the next day, resigned as speaker of the House. Upon his resignation, the House passed a motion declaring Pomeroy, who was himself leaving Congress the next day, duly elected as speaker in place of Colfax. In office for one day, his is the shortest tenure of any speaker of the U.S. House.

==== New York politics ====
After leaving Congress, Pomeroy was briefly out of politics. He returned to public life in the mid-1870s and was elected mayor of Auburn, New York, serving from 1875 to 1876, then as a member of the New York State Senate (25th D.) in 1878 and 1879.

=== Banking career ===
After the war ended, a boom in business production and industry began around the country. In the spring of 1866, the Merchants Union Express Company was organized to transport trade and goods across the United States with Elmore P. Ross as president, William H. Seward Jr. as vice-president, John N. Knapp as secretary, William C. Beardsley as treasurer, and Pomeroy as their attorney. By October 1866, the company was transporting goods across the major U.S. railroads and by the beginning of 1867, the company operated a network of express lines across the entire United States. The huge business incurred equally huge debts and in 1868, the company was acquired and merged with the American Merchants Union, now known as the American Express Company. Pomeroy stayed on and served as first vice-president and general counsel, along with co-founder William Fargo and later with William's brother, J. C. Fargo, in 1868.

== Personal life ==
On September 4, 1855, while serving his second term as District Attorney, he married Elizabeth Leitch Watson (1835–1892), the second daughter of Robert Watson, also of Auburn. Together, they had five children. Elizabeth's sister, Janet MacNeil Watson (1839–1913), married William H. Seward Jr. (1839–1920).

Pomeroy retired from public life in 1879 and lived at 168 Genesee Street in Auburn, where he died in 1905. Harriet Tubman (1822–1913) was a close friend of the family who helped care for the Pomeroy children. She attended his funeral and it was reported that only her flowers and letter were placed on his casket and buried with him.

=== Descendants ===
Pomeroy's grandchildren include New York state senator Robert Watson Pomeroy (1902–1989), Janet Pomeroy Avery (1891–1969), who married John Foster Dulles (1888–1959), the U.S. secretary of state during the Eisenhower administration, and Josephine Herrick (1897–1972), photographer and teacher.

His great-grandchildren include John W. F. Dulles (1913–2008), a professor of history and specialist in Brazil at the University of Texas at Austin, Lillias Dulles Hinshaw (1914–1987), a Presbyterian minister, and Avery Dulles (1918–2008), who converted to Roman Catholicism, entered the Jesuit order, and became the first American theologian to be appointed a cardinal.

== See also ==
- List of mayors of Auburn, New York

U.S. House of Representatives
Preceded by Martin Butterfield	Member of the U.S. House of Representatives from New York's 25th congressional district March 4, 1861 – March 3, 1863	Succeeded by Daniel Morris
Preceded by Charles B. Sedgwick	Member of the U.S. House of Representatives from New York's 24th congressional district March 4, 1863 – March 3, 1869	Succeeded by George W. Cowles
New York State Senate
Preceded by William B. Woodin	New York State Senate; 25th District; 1878–1879	Succeeded by Dennis McCarthy
