= Wells Fargo (film) =

1937 film by Frank Lloyd

- Theatrical release poster
- Directed by: Frank Lloyd
- Screenplay by: Paul Schofield; Gerald Geraghty; Frederick Jackson
- Story by: Stuart N. Lake
- Produced by: Frank Lloyd
- Starring: Joel McCrea; Bob Burns; Frances Dee
- Cinematography: Theodor Sparkuhl
- Edited by: Hugh Bennett
- Music by: Score: Victor Young; Songs: Burton Lane (music); Ralph Freed (lyrics)
- Production company: Paramount Pictures
- Distributed by: Paramount Pictures
- Release date: December 31, 1937
- Running time: 97 minutes
- Country: United States
- Language: English
- Budget: $1.5 million

Wells Fargo is a 1937 American historical Western film directed by Frank Lloyd and starring Joel McCrea, Bob Burns and Frances Dee. It was produced and distributed by Paramount Pictures.

== Plot ==
In the early 1840s, Wells & Fargo employee Ramsay MacKay comes upon a broken-down carriage in the countryside and gives belle Justine Pryor and her mother a lift into Buffalo, New York, though he warns them he is in a hurry to make a delivery of fresh oysters. The ladies endure a very bumpy ride, and he arrives in time to enable his employer, Henry Wells, to impress some bankers with the speed of his service.

Wells sends him to set up a branch office in St. Louis, which is quite convenient, as the Pryors reside there. MacKay and Justine begin seeing each other, though her mother disapproves, as does Justine's more socially prominent suitor, Talbot Carter.

Impressed with MacKay, in 1846, Wells sends him to open trails to California. MacKay takes along Hank York, a frontiersman who only works when he has to, and Hank's constant Indian companion, Pawnee. Among his many duties, MacKay sets out to transport gold from a mining settlement to San Francisco. One of his customers is prospector Dan Trimball. When Dan expresses his longing for his sweetheart back East, MacKay recommends Wells Fargo's new shipping venture. Elated, Dan sends for his girl. Meanwhile, when MacKay sets out with the gold, he is shot and left for dead by two robbers. Though he recovers, he is threatened by his miner customers, who do not believe he was robbed. He shows them a draft from Wells & Fargo that will cover all their losses.

When MacKay and Dan meet the ship in San Francisco in 1851, passenger Henry Wells has a surprise for his star employee: Justine has come too (though only with the blessing of her father). The happy couple get married. Though their union is strained at times by MacKay being away so often on business, they have a daughter and remain in love. For the birth of their second child, Justine sends her husband to fetch her mother.

Then comes the American Civil War. The marriage is strained to the breaking point. Desperately needed gold is sent repeatedly from the west to the Union, but the shipments are intercepted. Wells & Fargo is assigned the task of transporting $2,000,000 in gold. MacKay, chosen to lead the wagon train, meets with President Lincoln, who emphasizes to him how crucial this shipment is. However, Justine and Mrs. Pryor are fervent Southern supporters, and Justine's brother has been killed fighting for the Confederacy. When MacKay refuses Justine's plea to shirk his duty, she overhears the secret route he will take and writes it down. At the last moment, she crumples up the letter, but her mother has no such scruples. She passes the document along without her daughter's knowledge. As a result, MacKay is met by a Confederate force led by Talbot Carter. MacKay wins the battle, but both Talbot and Pawnee are killed. MacKay finds the letter in his wife's handwriting among Talbot's possessions.

When he returns to San Francisco, his house is empty. His wife and two children have gone with his mother-in-law.

Many years later, when MacKay goes east for dinner in his honor, he has an unexpected visitor afterward: his now teenage daughter Alice. She invites him to her seventeenth birthday party, but he declines, as he has to leave on business. However, he cannot stay away. When he enters, he sees his estranged wife and his heart softens. Then he discovers that she was not responsible for the bloodshed, and they are fully reconciled.

== Cast ==
- Joel McCrea as Ramsay MacKay
- Bob Burns as Hank York, a wanderer
- Frances Dee as Justine Pryor MacKay
- Lloyd Nolan as Dal Slade
- Henry O'Neill as Henry Wells
- Mary Nash as Mrs. Pryor
- Ralph Morgan as Nicholas Pryor
- Johnny Mack Brown as Talbot Carter
- Porter Hall as James Oliver
- Jack Clark as William Fargo
- Clarence Kolb as John Butterfield
- Robert Cummings as Dan Trimball, a prospector
- Granville Bates as Bradford, banker
- Harry Davenport as Ingalls, banker
- Frank Conroy as Mr. Ward, banker
- Brandon Tynan as Edwards, a newspaper publisher
- Peggy Stewart as Alice MacKay
- Bernard Siegel as Pawnee
- Stanley Fields as Abe, a prospector
- Lew Payton as Sam, Pryor's Butler
- Henry Brandon as Larry
- Frank McGlynn as Abraham Lincoln
- Ed Brady as Prospector (uncredited)

== Reception ==
Loren L. Ryder was nominated for an Academy Award in the category of Best Sound Recording.

== See also ==
- List of films and television shows about the American Civil War

== Bibliography ==
- Pitts, Michael R. Western Movies: A Guide to 5,105 Feature Films. McFarland, 2012.
- Smyth, J.E. Reconstructing American Historical Cinema: From Cimarron to Citizen Kane. University Press of Kentucky, 2006.
