= J. C. Fargo =

American businessman (1829–1915)

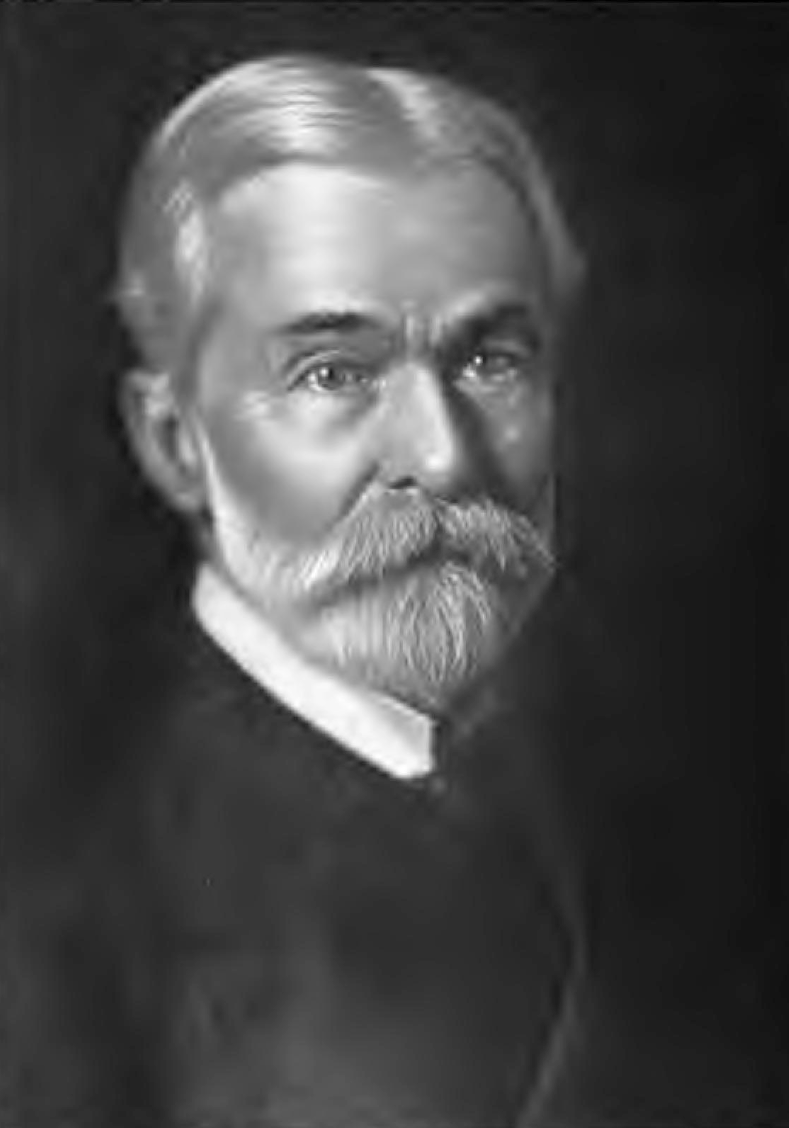
- Born: James Congdell Strong Fargo; May 5, 1829; Watervale, New York, US
- Died: February 8, 1915 (aged 85); New York City, US
- Known for: President of the American Express Company
- Spouse: Fannie Parsons Stuart (m. 1863; died 1896)
- Children: 4
- Relatives: William Fargo (brother)

Signature
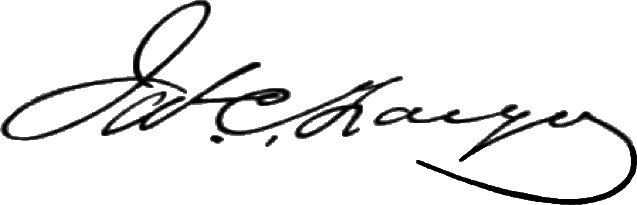

James Congdell Strong Fargo (May 5, 1829 – February 8, 1915) was a president of the American Express Company for 30 years, and the brother of American Express Company and Wells Fargo co-founder, William Fargo.

== Early life ==
Fargo was born on May 5, 1829, in Watervale, New York, an unincorporated hamlet in Onondaga County, northeast of Pompey. He was the seventh of eleven children born to William Congdell Fargo, of New London, Connecticut, and Stacy Chappel Strong. His older brother, the eldest child of William and Stacy, was William Fargo.

== Career ==
In 1845, when he was fifteen, he moved to Buffalo, New York, to work for his brother William, who was running express lines between Buffalo, Detroit, Michigan, and Albany, New York. Originally a clerk, Fargo was eventually tasked with the delivery of money packages. In 1847, Fargo was granted control of operations in Detroit. Four years later, when the company was organized as Wells Fargo & Company, Fargo was named Superintendent of Virginia operations.

In 1855, Fargo was appointed agent of Chicago, Illinois, for the American Express Company, the successor to Wells, Fargo & Co. He was then promoted to General Superintendent of the Northwest Division for the company. He left for New York City in 1867 to assume the position of General Manager of the American Express Company. He became the third president of American Express after William's death in 1881, with former U.S. Representative Theodore M. Pomeroy remaining vice-president. James was also a co-founder, along with William Fargo, of American Express. He was succeeded as president in 1914 by George Chadbourne Taylor.

=== Traveler's Cheque ===
Sometime between 1888 and 1890, J. C. Fargo took a trip to Europe and returned frustrated and infuriated. Despite the fact that he was president of American Express and that he carried with him traditional letters of credit, he found it difficult to obtain cash anywhere, except in major cities. Fargo went to Marcellus Flemming Berry and asked him to create a better solution than the traditional letter of credit. Berry, who had invented the express money order in 1882, created the American Express Traveler's Cheque, which was launched in 1891 in denominations of $10, $20, $50, and $100.

== Personal life ==
On December 15, 1863, Fargo was married to Frances Parsons "Fannie" Stuart. Fannie was the daughter of Col. John Stuart of Battle Creek, Michigan. Together, they were the parents of four children, including:

- William Congdell Fargo (1856–1941) who married Mary Stockwell Preston (1857–1912).
- James Francis Fargo (1857–1937), who married Jane Lindley King.
- Annie Stuart Fargo (1858–1884), who married William Duncan Preston (1859–1920)

Two of his children worked at the American, National, and Westcott Express Companies. His son William was the Secretary and his son James was the Treasurer.

His wife Fannie died on August 31, 1896.

J. C. Fargo died at his residence, 56 Park Avenue in New York City, on February 8, 1915. After a funeral at St. Barnabas Church, he was buried at Sleepy Hollow Cemetery in Sleepy Hollow, New York.

Business positions
| Preceded by William Fargo | CEO of American Express; 1881–1914 | Succeeded by George Chadbourne Taylor |
