= Henry Wells =

American businessman (1805–1878)

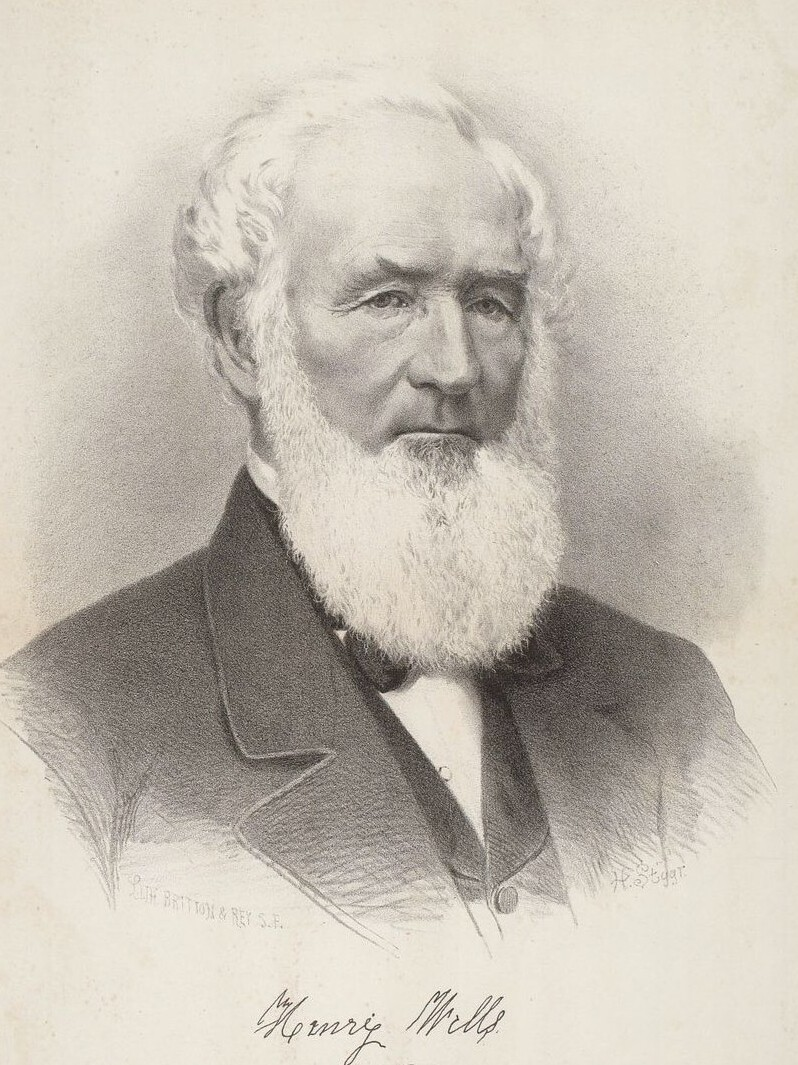
- Portrait by Britton & Rey, c. 1878

Personal details
- Born: December 12, 1805 Thetford, Vermont U.S.
- Died: December 10, 1878 (aged 72) Glasgow, Scotland
- Resting place: Oak Glen Cemetery; Aurora, New York, U.S.
- Spouses: Sarah Daggett (m. 1827; died 1859) Mary Prentice (m. 1861)
- Children: 4
- Parent(s): Shipley Wells; Dorothea Randall
- Occupation: Expressman, banker
- Known for: Co-founder of American Express Company, Wells Fargo, and Wells College

Henry Wells (December 12, 1805 – December 10, 1878) was an American businessman important in the history of both the American Express Company and Wells Fargo & Company. Wells worked as a freight agent before joining the express business. His companies, which were the predecessors of American Express and Wells Fargo, competed with the United States Post Office by carrying mail at less than the government rate. In higher education, Wells was the founder of Wells College in Aurora, New York.

== Life ==
Henry Wells was born in 1805 in Thetford, Vermont, the son of Dorothea "Dorothy" (Randall) and Shipley Wells, a Presbyterian minister at what is now the First Presbyterian Church of Seneca Falls, New York who moved his family to central New York State in the westward migration of Yankees out of New England. He was a member of the seventh generation of his family in America. His ancestor was an English immigrant Thomas Welles (1590–1659), who arrived in Massachusetts in 1635 and was the only man in Connecticut's history to hold all four top offices: governor, deputy governor, treasurer, and secretary. In this capacity, he transcribed the Fundamental Orders into the official colony records on 14 January 1638, OS, (24 January 1639, NS).

As a child, Henry worked on a farm and attended school in Fayette. In 1822, he was apprenticed to Jessup & Palmer, tanners and shoemakers at Palmyra, New York. In his adult life, he was also called as Henry "Stuttering" Wells and was known as a flamboyant character.

== Career ==
In 1836, Wells became a freight agent on the Erie Canal and soon started his own business. Later he worked for Harnden's Express in Albany. His entry into the express business launched a series of events that eventually led to the establishment of the American Express Company. When Wells suggested that service could be expanded west of Buffalo, New York, William F. Harnden urged Wells to go into business on his own account. In 1841, the firm of Pomeroy & Company was formed by George E. Pomeroy, Henry Wells and Crawford Livingston. In the express business they competed with the United States Post Office by carrying mail at less than the government rate. Popular support, roused by the example of the penny post in England, was on the side of the expressmen, and the government was compelled to reduce its rates in 1845 and again in 1851.

Pomeroy & Company was succeeded in 1844 by Livingston, Wells & Company, composed of Crawford Livingston, Henry Wells, William Fargo and Thaddeus Pomeroy. On April 1, 1845, Wells & Company's Western Express – generally known simply as Western Express because it was the first such company west of Buffalo – was established by Wells, Fargo and Daniel Dunning. Service was offered at first as far as Detroit, rapidly expanding to Chicago, St. Louis, and Cincinnati.

In 1846, Wells sold his interest in Western Express to William Livingston, whereupon the firm became Livingston, Fargo & Company. Wells then went to New York City to work for Livingston, Wells & Company, concentrating on the promising transatlantic express business. When Crawford Livingston died in 1847, another of his brothers entered the firm, which became Wells & Company. (However, Livingston, Wells & Company continued to operate under that firm name in England, France and Germany.)

=== American Express and Wells Fargo ===
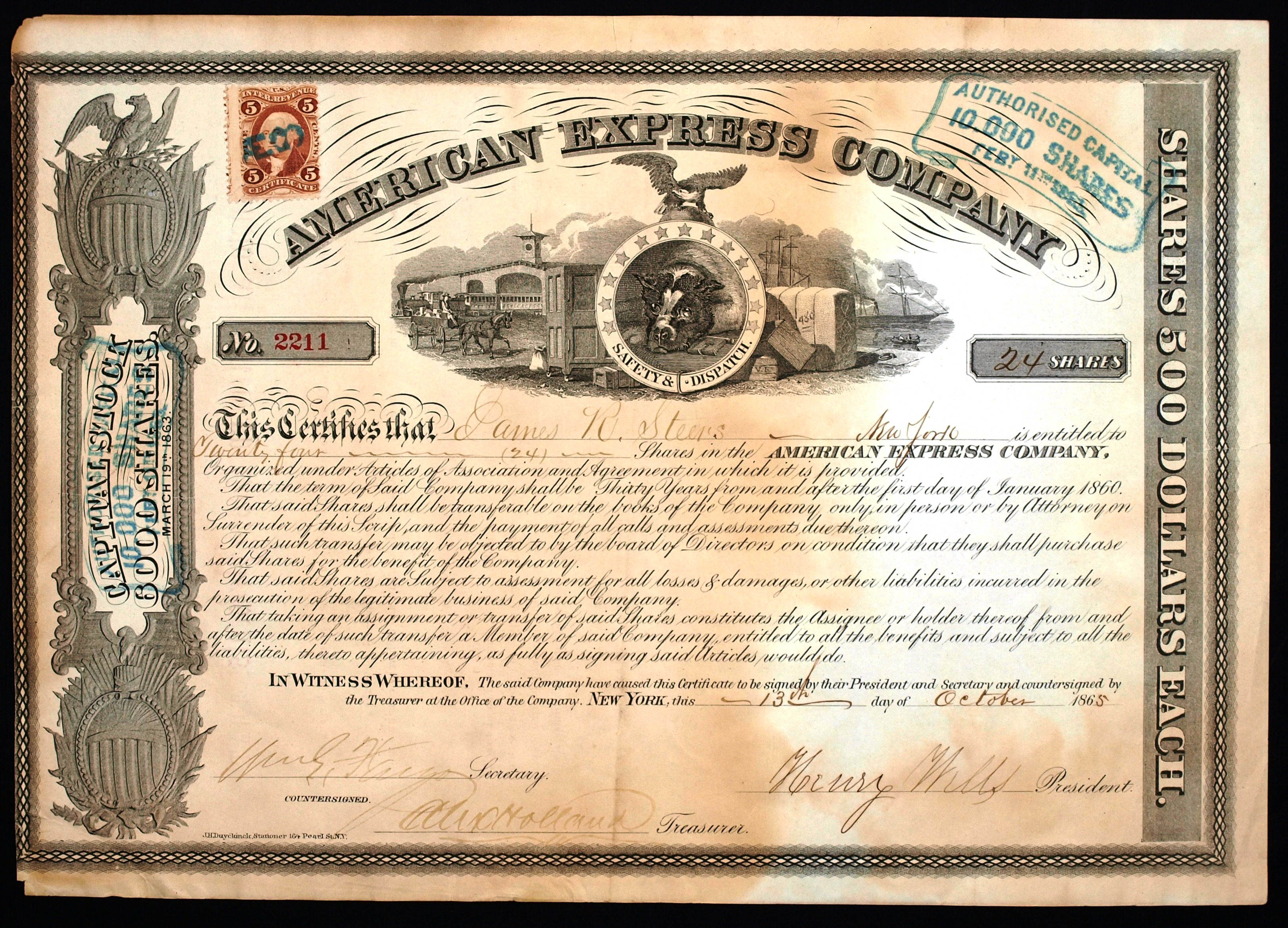
Share of the American Express Company, issued 13. October 1865; signed by William G. Fargo as Secretary and Henry Wells as President

Early in 1850, Wells formed Wells, Butterfield & Company with John Butterfield as the successor of Butterfield & Wasson. The same year the American Express Company was formed as a consolidation of Wells & Company; Livingston, Fargo & Company; and Wells, Butterfield & Company. Wells was president of American Express from 1850 to 1868. About the time the company was formed, he relocated in Aurora, New York, which remained his home for the rest of his life. There he built a grand residence, called Glen Park. It was designed by noted architect A.J. Davis, with grounds by Andrew Jackson Downing, another notable architect. The property later became part of Wells College, which Wells founded.

When John Butterfield and other directors of American Express objected to extending the company's service to California, Wells organized Wells, Fargo & Company on March 18, 1852, to undertake the venture. Edwin B. Morgan of Aurora was the company's first president, and Wells, William Fargo, Johnston Livingston and James McKay were on the boards of both Wells Fargo and American Express.

In September 1853, Wells Fargo & Company acquired Livingston, Wells & Company, which had been its express and banking correspondent in England, France and Germany. By the spring of 1854, some of the directors of Wells Fargo had become convinced that the purchase had been brought about through unspecified misrepresentations by Wells, Johnston Livingston, William N. Babbitt and S. De Witt Bloodgood. Wells and his associates made good any losses to Wells Fargo, and Livingston, Wells & Company wound up its affairs when its Paris office was closed in October 1856.

Wells was president in 1855 of the New Granada Canal & Steam Navigation Company. In Aurora he was president of the First National Bank of Aurora and in 1867 also the first president of the Cayuga Lake Railroad.

=== Later endeavors ===
Wells retired from the board of Wells Fargo in 1867. He also retired as president of American Express in 1868 when it was merged with the Merchants Union Express Company under the presidency of William Fargo. Also in 1868, Wells founded Wells College in Aurora with an endowment to make it one of the first women's colleges in the United States.

One of Wells' last ventures was the Arizona & New Mexico Express Company, of which he was president in 1876.

== Personal life ==
On September 5, 1827, Wells married Sarah Caroline Daggett (1803–1859), the daughter of Levi Daggett (1768–1835) and a descendant of the Doggett colonial settlers. They had four children:

- Charles Henry Wells (1828–1891), who married Louisa Burnham (1832–1905)
- Mary Elizabeth Wells (1830–1884), who married James H. Welles (1819–1873)
- Oscar A. Wells (1833–1909)
- Edward Wells

After his first wife's death on October 13, 1859, in Albany, New York, he married Mary Prentice of Boston in 1861.

Wells died in Glasgow, Scotland, on December 10, 1878, two days short of his 73rd birthday. He was brought home for burial in Aurora and was buried at Oak Glen Cemetery in Aurora. His body was transported back to the United States aboard the steam-ship Ethiopia. His funeral was held at his home in Aurora.

== See also ==
- Ezra Cornell

== Additional sources ==
- Loomis, Noel M. (1968). Wells Fargo. New York: Clarkson N. Potter.
- Malone, Dumas, ed. (1936). Dictionary of American Biography. New York: Charles Scribner's Sons.
- Norton, Frederick Calvin The governors of Connecticut: biographies of the chief executives of the commonwealth that gave to the world the first written constitution known to history, Publisher Connecticut Magazine Co., 1905.
- Siemiatkoski, Donna Holt (1990). The Descendants of Governor Thomas Welles of Connecticut, 1590–1658, and His Wife, Alice Tomes. Baltimore: Gateway Press.

Business positions
Preceded by Created	CEO of American Express; 1850–1868	Succeeded by William Fargo
