= Chandler J. Wells =

American politician (1814–1887)

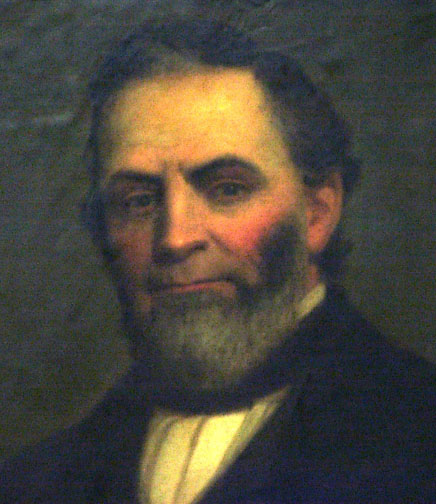
- Portrait of Wells, c. 1866

28th Mayor of Buffalo
- In office 1866–1867
- Preceded by: William G. Fargo
- Succeeded by: William Findlay Rogers

Personal details
- Born: June 10, 1814 Utica, New York, U.S.
- Died: February 4, 1887 (aged 72) Buffalo, New York, U.S.
- Party: Republican
- Spouse: Susan Jane Wheeler
- Children: 2

Chandler J. Wells (1814–1887) was mayor of Buffalo, New York, from 1866 to 1867.

== Early life ==
He was born in Utica, New York, on June 10, 1814, where his mother had gone to recuperate, while Buffalo was being rebuilt after the December 1813 burning. Not long after that they returned to Buffalo.

== Career ==
He became a joiner's apprentice and found employment with Benjamin Rathbun. He then worked as a contractor and builder and at one time owned three saw-mills around western New York. Around 1857, Wells became interested in buildings grain elevators and constructed the "Wells Elevator," later known as the "Wheeler Elevator." He later constructed other grain elevators at Buffalo.

In 1854, Wells was elected to his first public office, as alderman for the second ward. He held that office continuously until 1859. He was elected mayor on November 7, 1865, as the Republican candidate. In September 1866, Mayor Wells received General Ulysses Grant, President Andrew Johnson, and members of his cabinet on their visit to Buffalo. The Fenian uprising also occurred during 1866, with thousands of Fenians gathering in Buffalo. He did not seek a second term in office.

After his term, in 1868, he was appointed to the Board of Water Commissioners and oversaw construction of the water inlet pier in the Niagara River. In 1870, Wells began importing sand for paving and building purposes from property purchased at Point Abino on Lake Erie.

== Personal life ==
On April 20, 1837, he married Susan Jane Wheeler.

He died on February 4, 1887, and is buried in Forest Lawn Cemetery.

Political offices
Preceded by William G. Fargo	Mayor of Buffalo, NY; 1866–1867	Succeeded by William Findlay Rogers
