= Executive Travel =

American bimonthly magazine

- Frequency: Bi-monthly
- Circulation: 135,000
- Publisher: Time Inc.
- First issue: May 2002
- Final issue: 2014
- Website: www.executivetravelmagazine.com

Executive Travel magazine was an American bimonthly magazine published in New York City by Time Inc. The magazine, launched in May 2002, was published 6 times a year. Geared toward upscale executives, the magazine covered relevant topics on business, travel and affluent lifestyle.

== Overview ==
Executive Travel offered exclusive reach to American Express Corporate Platinum Cardmembers. The publication was initially released by American Express Publishing but was sold on October 1, 2013 to Time Inc.

On February 4, 2014 Time Inc. announced that it was to cease publishing the magazine. The final issue was the December 2013/January 2014 issue.

== See also ==
- Get Lost Magazine
- Travel Trade Gazette
