= John E. Seeley =

American politician (1810–1875)

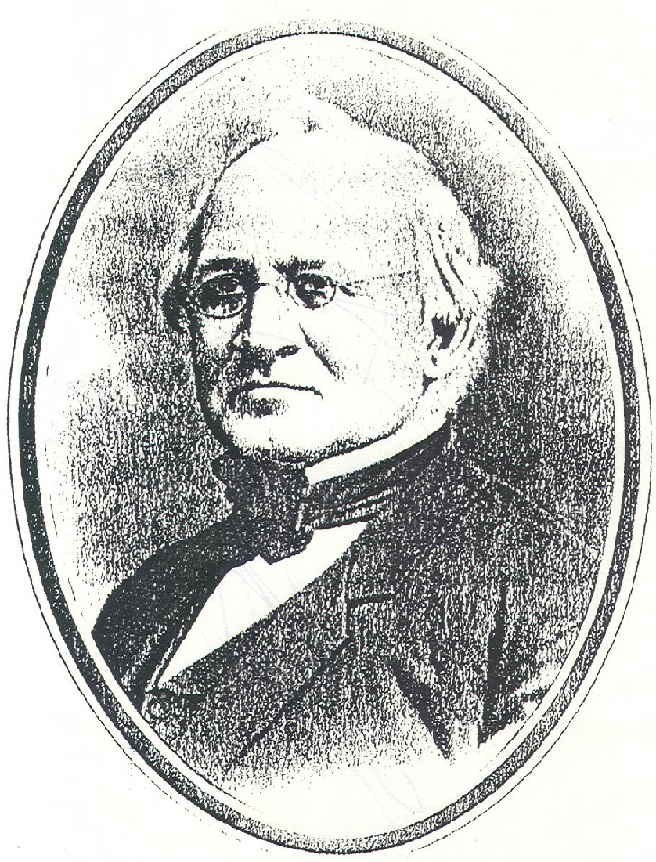

Member of the U.S. House of Representatives from New York's 24th district
- In office March 4, 1871 – March 3, 1873
- Preceded by: George W. Cowles
- Succeeded by: R. Holland Duell

Personal details
- Born: John Edward Seeley; August 1, 1810 Ovid, New York, U.S.
- Died: March 30, 1875 (aged 64) Ovid, New York, U.S.
- Party: Republican
- Education: Ovid Academy; Yale College
- Profession: Politician, lawyer

John Edward Seeley (August 1, 1810 – March 30, 1875) was a U.S. representative from New York.

Born in Ovid, New York, Seeley attended Ovid Academy and was graduated from Yale College in 1835, where he was a member of Skull and Bones. He studied law. He was admitted to the bar and commenced practice in Monroe, Michigan. He returned to Ovid, New York, in 1839. Supervisor of Ovid in 1842. County judge and surrogate of Seneca County, New York from 1851 to 1855. He served as delegate to the Republican National Convention in 1856.

In the 1860 presidential election, he was a presidential elector for Abraham Lincoln and Hannibal Hamiln.

Seeley was elected as a Republican to the Forty-second Congress (March 4, 1871 – March 3, 1873). He resumed the practice of his profession in Ovid, New York, and died there March 30, 1875. He was interred on his farm near Ovid.

== Sources ==
- United States Congress. "John E. Seeley (id: S000223)". Biographical Directory of the United States Congress.

U.S. House of Representatives
Preceded by George W. Cowles	Member of the U.S. House of Representatives from New York's 24th congressional district 1871–1873	Succeeded by R. Holland Duell
