= George W. Cowles =

American politician

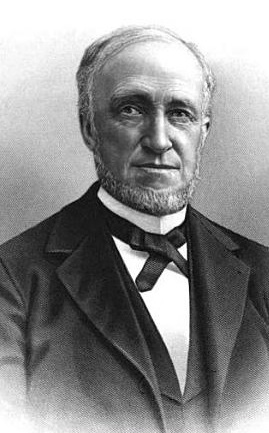

Member of the U.S. House of Representatives from New York
- In office March 4, 1869 – March 3, 1871
- Preceded by: Theodore M. Pomeroy
- Succeeded by: John E. Seeley
- Constituency: 24th district

Personal details
- Born: December 6, 1823 Otisco, New York, US
- Died: January 20, 1901 (aged 77) Auburn, New York, US
- Party: Republican
- Education: Hamilton College
- Profession: Law

George Washington Cowles (December 6, 1823 – January 20, 1901) was a U.S. representative from New York.

== Biography ==
George W. Cowles was born in Otisco, New York on December 6, 1823. He attended the common schools, and in 1845 graduated from Hamilton College in Clinton, New York. While at Hamilton he joined the Alpha Delta Phi fraternity.

Cowles taught school prior to and while studying law. He was admitted to the bar in 1854 and commenced practice in Clyde, New York. From 1864 to 1869 he served as Judge of the Wayne County court.

In 1868 Cowles was elected as a Republican to the Forty-first Congress (March 4, 1869 – March 3, 1871). He was not a candidate for renomination in 1870.

After his term in Congress Cowles resumed the practice of law. He served as again Judge of the Wayne County court from 1874 to 1880, and from 1886 until his death. He was the editor of 1895's Landmarks of Wayne County, New York.

Cowles died in Clyde, New York on January 20, 1901. He was interred in Clyde's Maple Grove Cemetery.

U.S. House of Representatives
Preceded by Theodore M. Pomeroy	Member of the U.S. House of Representatives from New York's 24th congressional district March 4, 1869 – March 3, 1871	Succeeded by John E. Seeley
