= Marcellus Flemming Berry =

American inventor

Marcellus Flemming Berry was an American inventor who devised the traveller's cheque while working for American Express.
