= John Butterfield (businessman) =

American businessman and transportation pioneer (1801–1869)

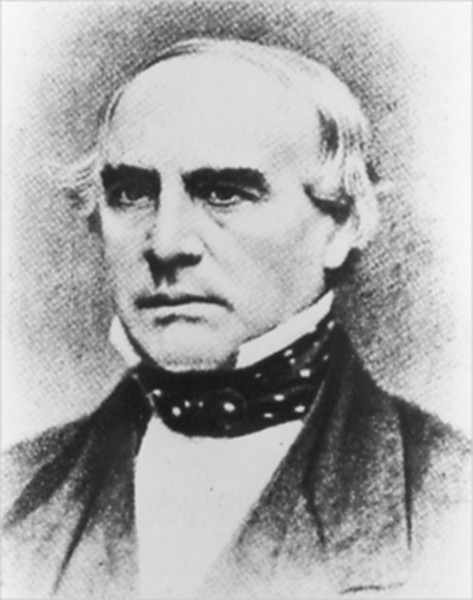
- Born: November 18, 1801; Berne, New York, U.S.
- Died: November 14, 1869 (aged 67); Utica, New York, U.S.
- Resting place: Forest Hill Cemetery; Utica, New York, U.S.

John Butterfield (November 18, 1801 – November 14, 1869) was a transportation pioneer in the mid-19th century in the American Northwest and Southwest. He founded many companies, including American Express which is still in operation today. The Butterfield Overland Mail Company was the longest stagecoach line in the world. The line operated from 1858 to 1861 on the Southern Overland Trail and established an important connection between the new state of California and the government and economy of the contiguous eastern states.

== Early life ==
John Butterfield was a descendant of Benjamin Butterfield, who brought his family from England to the Massachusetts Bay Colony in 1638. Benjamin settled in Woburn and settled there as a freeman. John Butterfield's father, Daniel Butterfield, lived at Berne, New York, on the Van Rensselaer Manor, near Albany. In 1822 Daniel married Malinda Harriet Baker. John was born November 18, 1801, in Berne. He attended schools near his boyhood home, but his education was meager. He was employed in the staging business at an early age.

“In early life we find him in the employment of Thorpe & Sprague, of that city [Albany], as a driver, and through the solicitation of Mr. Theodore S. Faxton came to Utica [NY], where he for a time was employed in picking up passengers from the taverns and boats for Parker’s stages. After a time, he started a livery [1827] with but small accommodations. His connection to Parker & Co. continued so long as they were still in business, and was succeeded by lines of his own, wherein he was a leading manager in the State until staging was superseded by railroads.”

== Business ventures ==
Butterfield started stage lines based in his hometown of Utica, New York, using Concord coaches or more commonly known as tally-ho. He had partnered with several other pioneers in the industry such as James Gardner, F.S. Faxton, Hiram Greenman, and Silas Childs. Butterfield focused largely on lines running North and South. At the peak of his business, he had forty lines running from Utica as headquarters to Ogdensburg and Sacketts Harbor on the North, and South to the Pennsylvania line, and through Chemung and Susquehanna valleys. His line overpowered Peter Cole and Henry Storms' company, which monopolized staging since 1821.

He soon expanded his transportation empire.

“He became interested in packet boats on the [Erie] canal, and in steamboats on Lake Ontario, in the construction of plank roads leading to Utica and was the originator of its street railroads. He more than any other secured the building of the Black River and Southern railroads. When the practical uses of the electrical telegraph were demonstrated he joined Faxton, Wells, Livingston and others in establishing the New York, Albany and Buffalo Telegraph Company, and urged the extension of other lines and companies. …He was a pioneer in the transportation business, and aided in developing it from the crude methods of the stage coach to those of the fast trains of our own time.”

John became aware that there was a need to ship parcels (express) by his varied transportation companies.

“In 1849 he formed the express company of Butterfield, Wasson & Co. being among the first who saw the profit to be gained by the rapid carriage of merchandise that would bear express charges. The success of that important enterprise was largely owing to him; he was a directing power in it during his life and reaped from its great distinction and pecuniary power. Later the business was conducted and is still known as the American Express Company, among the greatest corporations of the country”

Because of the pioneering success to establish an express company, other entrepreneurs in upstate New York, not far from John Butterfield's home in Utica, also started express companies by using Butterfield's vast transportation network. Henry Wells was from Auburn, NY (80-miles from Utica), and William Fargo was from Pompei, NY (50-miles from Utica) and their express companies of Wells & Co., and Livingston, Fargo & Co. became competitors of Butterfield, Wasson & Co. Butterfield saw the benefit of forming one company by consolidating the three separate companies. In 1850, The American Express Company was formed from the three companies into one consisting of two subdivisions. The company's subdivision of Wells, Butterfield & Co. would control the express business from Buffalo, NY, to the east, and the subdivision of Livingston, Fargo & Co. would control the express business from Buffalo to St. Louis, Missouri.

== John Butterfield’s Overland Mail Company ==
Congressional authorized researcher Sanders put into perspective Wells, Fargo & Co.’s only direct involvement with the Butterfield Overland Mail Company. He stated “Wells Fargo may have run a ‘trunk route’ off the Butterfield [Trail] in LA [Los Angeles] but it was NOT Butterfield per se.” The line was very expensive and cost $3,500,000 to build and maintain. Some of the money was borrowed from the banks of express companies such as Adams Express and Wells, Fargo & Co. Express. William B. Dinsmore, who was also president of Adams Express Co., was the second largest stockholder and was Vice President of Butterfield’s Overland Mail Company. The largest lender may have been Wells, Fargo & Co. Express, since they were the most successful of the express companies.

Ownership of the six-year contract for John Butterfield’s Overland Mail Company was by stockholders only and therefore any ownership was as stated on the stock certificates. Nowhere in the six-year contract, with all its various changes from 1858 to 1864, is the name of Wells, Fargo & Co. to be seen.

“Although Wells Fargo & Company shared board members with several stagecoach companies, it was not primarily in the stagecoach business, it was, first and foremost, an express company, concerned with expediting the shipment of almost anything between a paying sender and an intended addressee.

In the late 1960s, some historians tried to make the case, through deductive reasoning only, that Wells, Fargo & Co. was an active part of Butterfield’s Overland Mail Company. One of these was Ralph Moody even though he stated in his book Stagecoach West:

“No conclusive evidence has been ever discovered to prove that Wells, Fargo & Co. had outright ownership of the Overland Mail Company and the Pioneer Stage Line on or before July 1, 1861, the date on which the overland mail contract was transferred to the central line.”

It wasn’t until 1867, five years after Butterfield ceased operations on the Southern Overland Trail, that Wells, Fargo & Co. entered the staging business when they scraped off the name on the transom rails of the Pioneer Stage Line and added their own. The line was operating on the western section of the Central Overland Trail.

== Legacy ==
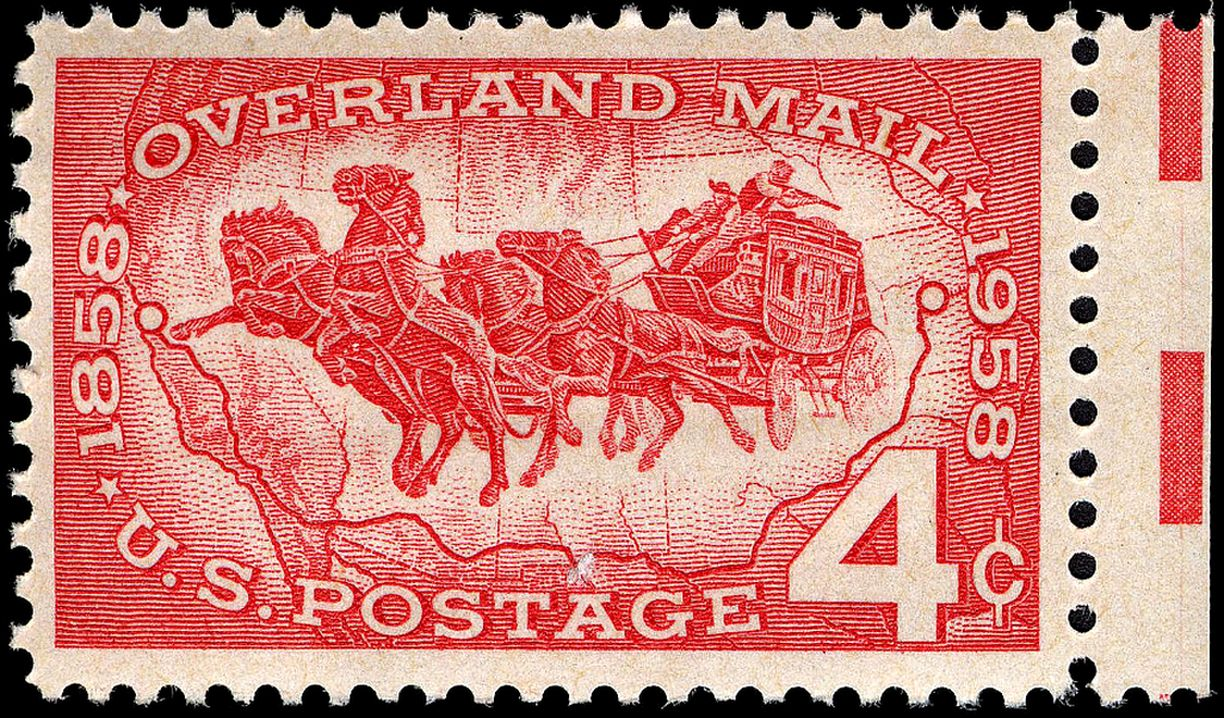
In 1958 the U.S. Post Office issued a commemorative stamp, celebrating the 100th anniversary of the Overland Mail stage line express.

His son, Daniel Adams Butterfield (1831–1901), was a Union brigadier general in the American Civil War, and assistant U.S. treasurer. Daniel is credited with creating the bugle call Taps, a variation of a bugle call known as the Scott Tattoo, in 1862.

Butterfield died on November 14, 1869, at his home in Utica. Butterfield was buried in Forest Hill Cemetery in Utica, New York, where he lived when he established his first stage coach line.

The Resource Study Act, to designate the Butterfield Trail as a National Historic Trail, was authorized under the Omnibus Public Lands Management Act (Public Law 111-11) signed by President Barack Obama on March 30, 2009. The act was completed and in June 2018 the bill was presented to Congress by Arkansas Senator John Boozman. Kirby Sanders was the consulting historian and lead researcher for the Butterfield study for the National Park Service.

== See also ==
- Butterfield Overland Mail
- Stagecoach

== Bibliography ==
- Ahnert, Gerald T., The Butterfield Trail and Overland Mail Company in Arizona, 1858-1861, Canastota Publishing, Co. Inc., Canastota, New York, 2011. This book is a comprehensive account of the Butterfield Trail in Arizona.
- Ahnert, Gerald T., The Cochise County Historical Journal, A Cochise County Historical Publication, Vol. 46 -No. 1 – Spring/Summer 2016, 50th Anniversary Issue. All articles were by Gerald T. Ahnert concerning the history of Butterfield's Overland Mail Company.
- Ahnert, Gerald T. & Nancy Hendricks, The Encyclopedia of Arkansas History & Culture, Butterfield's Overland Mail Company, Editor Guy Lancaster. https://encyclopediaofarkansas.net/entries/butterfields-overland-mail-company-2308/
- Ahnert, Gerald T., Desert Tracks,, a publication of the Southern Trails Chapter of the Oregon-California Trails Association, The Construction of the Butterfield Trail in Eastern Arizona, June 2013, p. 18.
- Ahnert, Gerald T., Desert Tracks, a publication of the Southern Trails Chapter of the Oregon-California Trails Association, Arizona's Sentinel Plain, January 2016, pp. 8–12.
- Ahnert, Gerald T., Desert Tracks, a publication of the Southern Trails Chapter of the Oregon-California Trails Association, Researching the Butterfield Trail Through Arizona, January 2013, pp. 7–9.
- Ahnert, Gerald T., Overland Journal, Oregon-California Trails Association, Identifying Butterfield's Overland Mail Company Stages on the Southern Trail, 1858–1861, Volume 32, Number 4, Winter 2014–2015, pp. 140–163.
- Ahnert, Gerald T., The Carriage Journal, Surviving a Ride of a Butterfield Stagecoach, Volume 53, Number 4, August 2015, pp. 220–225.
- Ahnert, Gerald T., SCVhistory.com, A Service of SCVTV/Local Television for Santa Clarita, California, CEO Leon Worden, Construction of the Overland Mail Co. Stage Line in California, January 2014.
- Ahnert, Gerald T., SCVhistory.com, A Service of SCVTV/Local Television for Santa Clarita, California, CEO Leon Worden, Stagecoach or Celerity Wagon, January 2014.
- Ahnert, Gerald T., SCVhistory.com, A Service of SCVTV/Local Television for Santa Clarita, California, CEO Leon Worden, Butterfield Overland Mail Co. Celerity Wagon.
- Ahnert, Gerald T., SCVhistory.com, A Service of SCVTV/Local Television for Santa Clarita, California, CEO Leon Worden, Butterfield's Overland Mail, Co. Timetable.
- Ahnert, Gerald T., California Parks Service, Director Roger Deshi, “Butterfield Overland Mail Company Stagecoaches and Stage (Celerity) wagons used on the Southern Trail, 1858-1861,” 2013. https://www.parks.ca.gov/pages/22491/files/butterfield_overland_mail_company_stagecoaches_and_stage_wagons_used_on_southern_trail_1858-1861_gerald_ahnert.pdf
- Ahnert, Gerald T., California Parks Service, Director Roger Deshi, “Construction of the Butterfield Overland Mail Company Stage Line in California, 1858-1861,” 2013. https://www.parks.ca.gov/pages/22491/files/construction_of_butterfield_overland_mail_company_stage_line_in_california_gerald_ahnert_coyright_2013.pdf
- Ahnert, Gerald T., Legends of America, (Facebook site) "John Butterfield and the Overland Mail." https://www.legendsofamerica.com/we-butterfield/
- "Overland Mail Issue". Smithsonian National Postal Museum. 1958.
- "Forest Hill: History". Utica Cemetery Association, Utica New York.
