= William Fargo =

American businessman and politician (1818–1881)

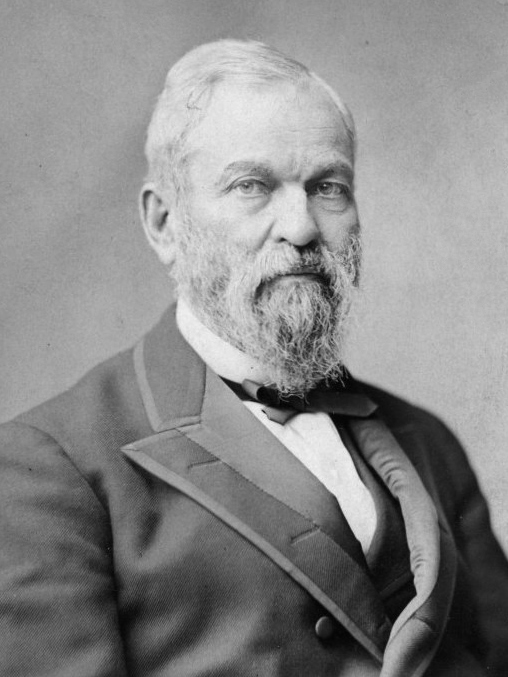

27th Mayor of Buffalo
- In office 1862–1866
- Preceded by: Franklin A. Alberger
- Succeeded by: Chandler J. Wells

Personal details
- Born: William George Fargo; May 20, 1818 Pompey, New York, U.S.
- Died: August 3, 1881 (aged 63) Buffalo, New York, U.S.
- Resting place: Forest Lawn Cemetery, Buffalo, New York
- Party: Democratic
- Spouse: Anna Hurd Williams
- Relations: J. C. Fargo (brother)
- Children: 8
- Occupation: Expressman, banker, politician
- Known for: Co-founder of American Express Company and Wells Fargo
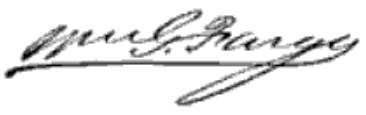
- Signature

William George Fargo (May 20, 1818 – August 3, 1881) was an American businessman and politician who, along with Henry Wells, co-founded Wells Fargo. Originally a shipping, mail delivery, stagecoach, and banking company, Wells Fargo expanded to become a major financial services corporation, which is now considered one of the Big Four of banks in the United States by assets. Fargo was also a co-founder of American Express, along with Wells and John Butterfield.

== Early life ==
William George Fargo was born in Pompey in Onondaga County, New York, on May 20, 1818. He was the eldest of twelve children of William C. Fargo (1791–1878) and Stacy Chappel Strong (1799–1869). His younger brother was James Congdell Strong Fargo (1829–1915), who served as president of American Express for 30 years. William's education was limited to the elements of a primary school.

Fargo's family history extends backwards to the seventeenth century, where his ancestor, Jacent "Jason" Fargeau (1622-?), was born in Lyon, France. His son, Moses (1648-1742) was born in Lyon as well. After immigrating to Wales, then to Norfolk, Connecticut, Moses' son, Moses Fargo (1691-1798) , was born. William Fargo (1726-1813) was born in Connecticut, with his son, William Beebe Fargo (1757-1801), serving with distinction in the American Revolutionary War. William George's father, William C. Fargo, who was born in New London, Connecticut, fought in the War of 1812. William C. Fargo was stationed at Fort Niagara and fought in the battle of Queenston Heights under General Van Rensselaer that resulted in the death of British General Isaac Brock and also captured a British battery. Fargo was wounded in his right thigh, just before the Americans took possession of the ground.

== Career ==
At the age of 13, Fargo left school and started carrying mail for his native village of Pompey, New York. In the winter of 1838, Fargo started working with the grocery company Hough & Gilchrist, from Syracuse. He remained there for a year until he went to work with the grocers Roswell and Willett Hinman. After three years, Fargo obtained a clerkship in the forwarding house of Dunford & Co., Syracuse. In 1841, he became a freight agent, an express messenger between Albany and Buffalo, for the Auburn and Syracuse Railroad in Auburn. A year later in 1843, Fargo was a Resident Agent in Buffalo, New York. He left the Auburn and Syracuse Railroad and joined Livingston, Wells & Co., as messenger.

=== American Express Company ===
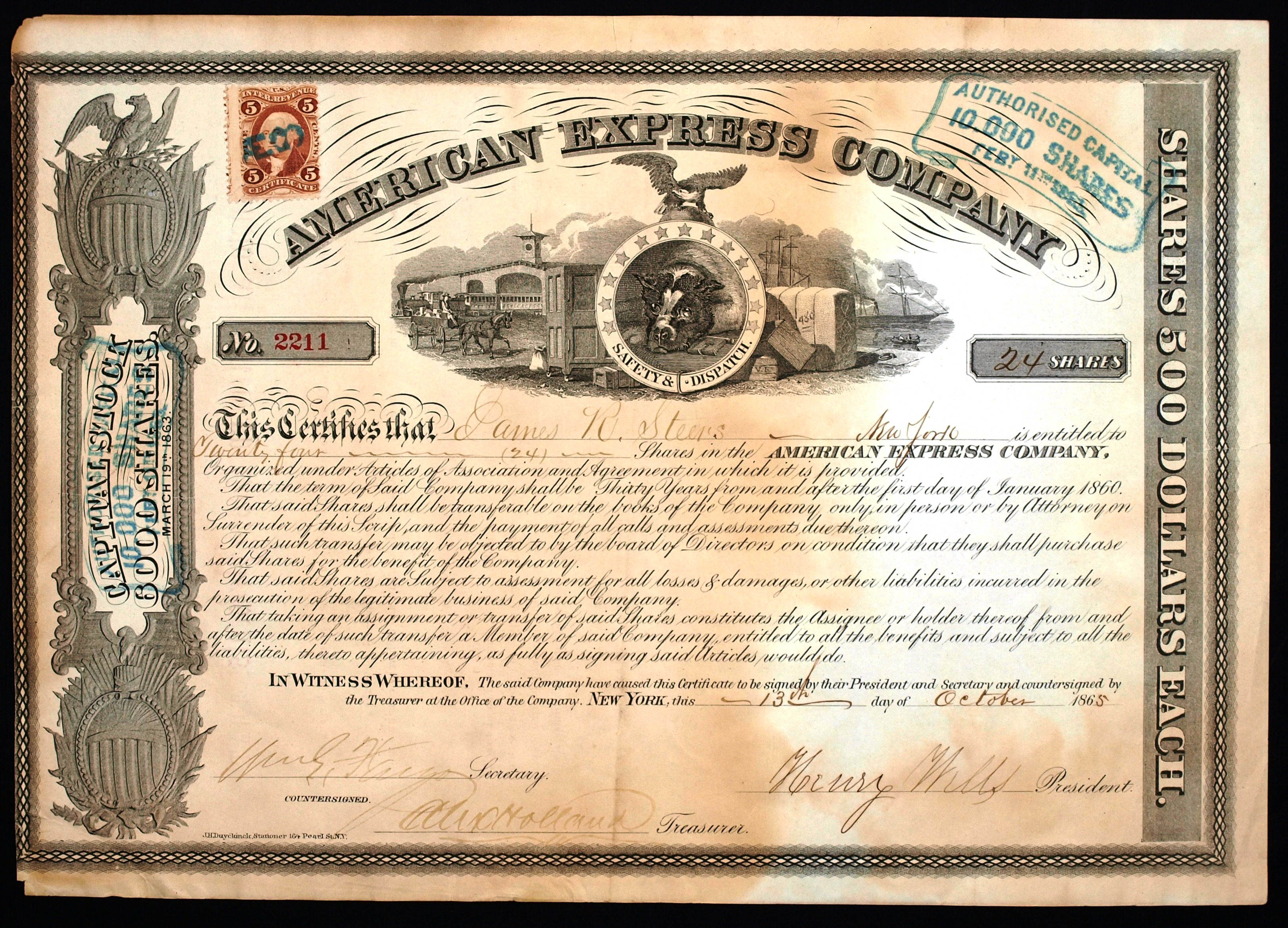
Share of the American Express Company, issued 13. October 1865; signed by William G. Fargo as Secretary and Henry Wells as President

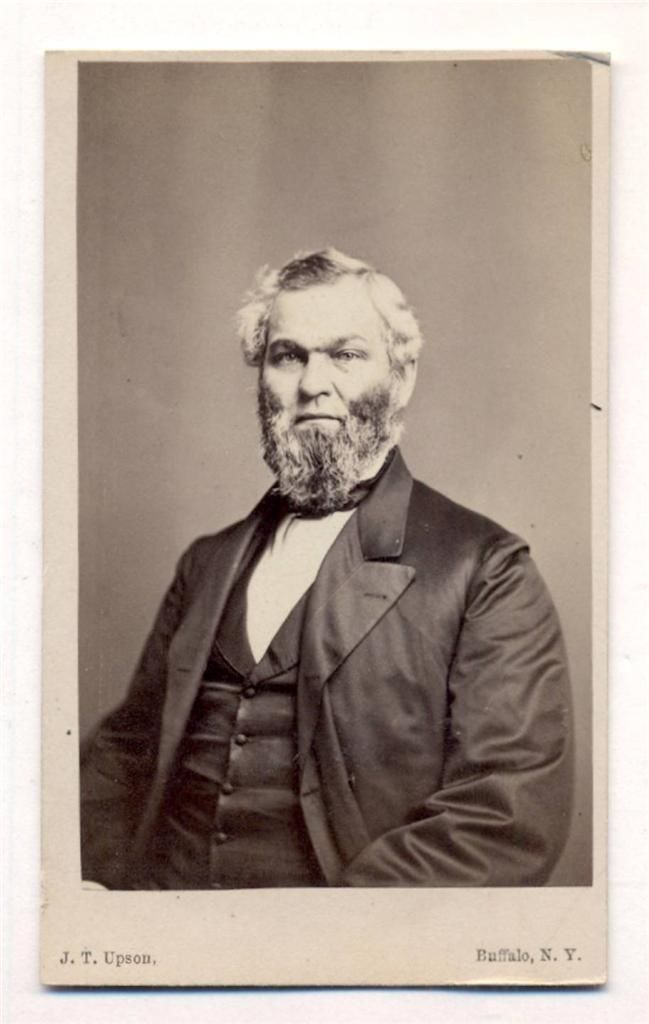
William G. Fargo in 1865

On April 1, 1845, along with Henry Wells and Daniel Dunning, Fargo organized the Western Express which ran from Buffalo to Cincinnati, St. Louis, Chicago and intermediate points, under the name of Wells & Co. At that time, there were no railroad facilities west of Buffalo, and Fargo, who was in charge of the business, made use of steamboats and wagons.

In 1845, Daniel Dunning withdrew from the company, and in 1846, Henry Wells sold out his interest in this concern to William A. Livingston, who became Fargo's partner in Livingston, Fargo & Company. In 1850, three competing express companies: Wells & Company (Henry Wells), Livingston, Fargo & Company (Fargo and William A. Livingston), and Wells, Butterfield & Company, the successor earlier in 1850 of Butterfield, Wasson & Company (John Warren Butterfield), were consolidated and became the American Express Company, with Wells as President and Fargo as Secretary.

In 1866, upon the resignation of Henry Wells and American Express' merger with the Merchants Union Express Company, Fargo was elected President of the American Express Company. He was the company's president until he died in 1881, at which point his brother, J. C. Fargo, assumed the presidency, holding the post until 1914.

=== Wells Fargo & Company ===
In 1852, Henry Wells and William Fargo created Wells Fargo & Co. when Butterfield (and other directors of American Express) objected to the extension of its operations to California. The original Wells Fargo & Co. was created to facilitate an express business between New York and San Francisco by way of the Isthmus of Panama and the Pacific coast. The new company offered banking services, which included buying gold and selling paper bank drafts, and express services, which included rapid delivery of gold and anything else valuable. The company opened for business in the gold rush city of San Francisco, and soon the company's agents opened offices in the other new cities and mining camps in the West.

In 1861, Wells Fargo & Company bought and reorganized the Overland Mail Co., which had been formed in 1857 to carry the United States mail, and of which Fargo had been one of the original promoters.

=== Other ===
Fargo was a director and vice-president of New York Central Railroad Company, a director and shareholder of the Northern Pacific Railway, a director of the Buffalo, New York and Philadelphia Railroad Company, and a shareholder in the Buffalo Coal Company and the McKean and Buffalo Railroad Company. He was also a stockholder in several large manufacturing establishments in Buffalo.

== Political career ==
In 1861, he was elected mayor of Buffalo, serving from 1862 to 1866. He was elected to a second term in 1863, defeating future mayor Chandler J. Wells. During his term as mayor, the Buffalo riot of 1862 took place. Fargo was a lifelong Democrat and stood against secession. He supported the Union during the Civil War by paying a part of the salary of his employees that were drafted.

== Personal life ==
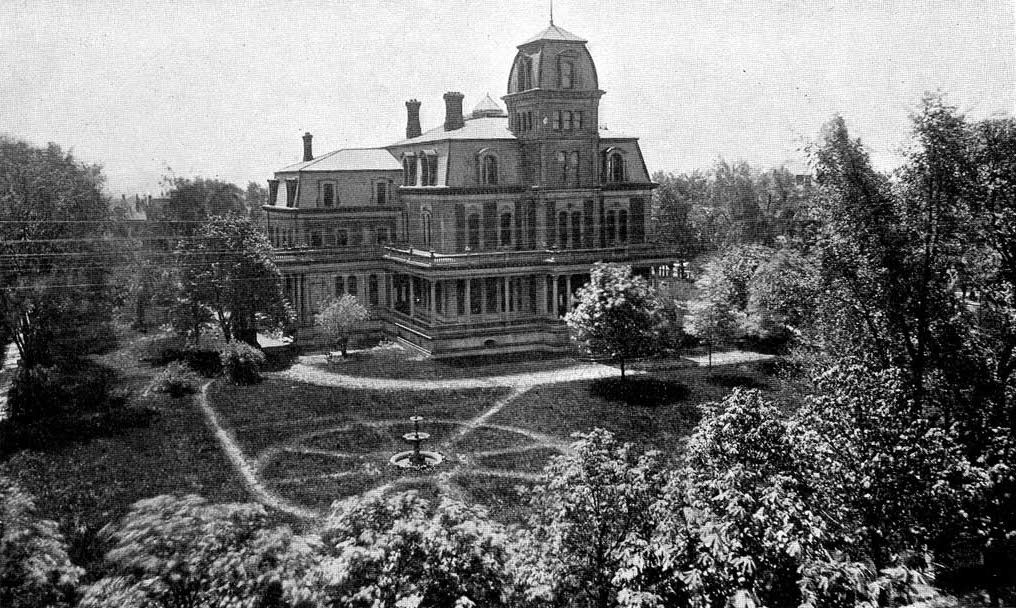
William G. Fargo Mansion in Buffalo, New York

In January 1840, Fargo married Anna H. Williams (1820–1890), daughter of Nathan Williams, one of the proprietors of Pompey, with whom he had eight children:

- Georgia Fargo (1841–1892), who died unmarried
- Alma Cornelia Fargo (1842–1842), who died as an infant
- Sarah Irene Fargo (1843–1854)
- William George Fargo Jr. (1845–1872), who married Minerva Elizabeth Prendergast (1848–1873)
- Hannah Sophia Fargo (1847–1851), who died young
- Mary Louise Fargo (1851–1852), who died young
- Helen Lacy Fargo (1857–1886), who married Herbert G. Squiers (1859–1911), a diplomat who served as Minister to Cuba (1902–1905) and Panama (1906–1909)
- Edwin Morgan Fargo (1861–1865), who died young

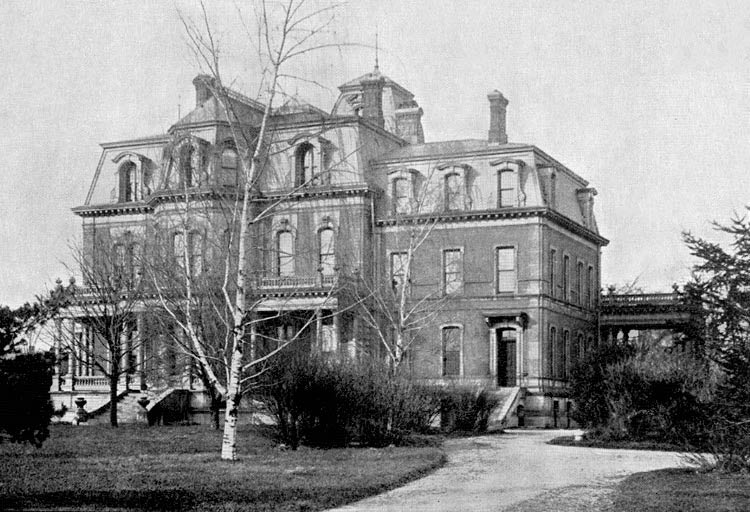
William G. Fargo Mansion as it appeared in 1900 before it was demolished

In 1868, when he was 50, Fargo bought 5.5 acres (2.2 ha) on the Buffalo's west side; and between 1868 and 1872, he built the Fargo Mansion at Jersey and Fargo Streets, which was Buffalo's largest mansion. The home was completed in 1872 at a cost of $600,000 (equivalent to $16,125,000 in 2025). Another $100,000 (equivalent to $2,688,000 in 2025) was spent to furnish and decorate the 22,170-square-foot (2,060 m^{2}) mansion. Michael Rizzo, a Buffalo historian, wrote:

the 'most elaborate and costly private mansion in the state,' outside of New York City. The house took two city blocks, from Pennsylvania Avenue, West Avenue, Jersey Street, and Fargo Avenue. There was a central tower five stories high. At his request it contained wood from all the states of the Union. It was the first home in the city to contain an elevator in it, and it was said to have gold doorknobs."

He died on August 3, 1881, after battling an illness for several months. After his funeral on August 7, 1881, he was buried at Forest Lawn Cemetery. At the time of his death, only two of his children were living, Georgia and Helen Fargo. William's brother, J. C. Fargo, succeeded him as President of American Express after his death.

== Legacy ==
Fargo's wife, Anna, died in 1890. With their two surviving children living elsewhere, the Fargo Mansion stood vacant for 10 years. It was deemed too expensive to maintain and, with no buyer, the mansion was demolished and the block was divided into residential lots in 1901. The mansion and estate grounds were only 30 years old.

Fargo Avenue in Buffalo; the Fargo Quadrangle at the University at Buffalo; and Fargo, North Dakota, are named after him.

The Fargo Estate Historic District was listed on the National Register of Historic Places in 2016.

== See also ==
- American Express
- Wells Fargo
- J. C. Fargo
- Henry Wells
- John Warren Butterfield

Political offices
Preceded by Franklin A. Alberger	Mayor of Buffalo, New York; 1862–1866	Succeeded by Chandler J. Wells
Business positions
Preceded by Henry Wells	CEO of American Express; 1868–1881	Succeeded by J. C. Fargo
Preceded by Ashbel H. Barney	President of Wells Fargo & Company Express; 1870–1872	Succeeded by Lloyd Tevis
