= American Express =

American multinational financial services corporation

American Express Company

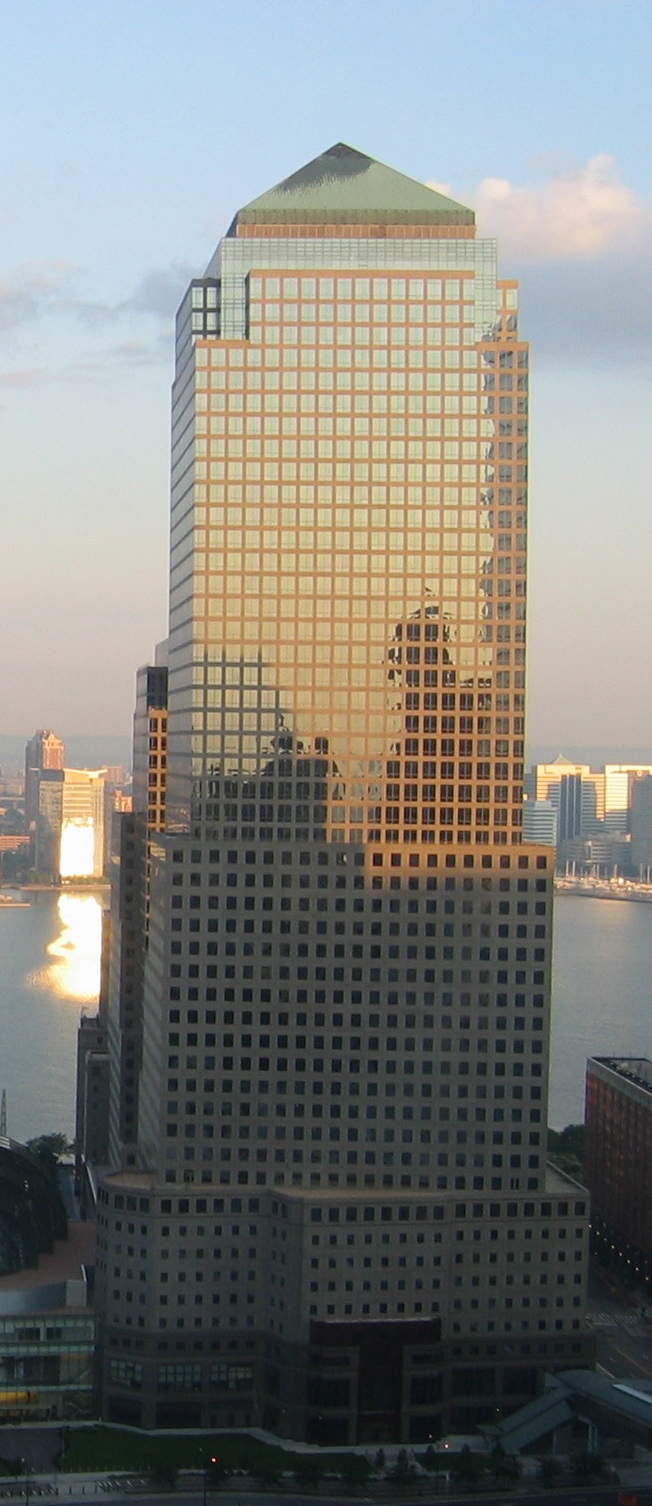
- Headquarters at the American Express Tower
- Type: Public
- Traded as: NYSE: AXP; DJIA component; S&P 100 component; S&P 500 component
- Industry: Financial Services
- Predecessor: Livingston, Fargo & Company; Wells, Butterfield & Company; Wells & Company
- Founded: March 18, 1850; 176 years ago, in Buffalo, New York, U.S.
- Headquarters: 200 Vesey Street, New York City, U.S.
- Area served: Worldwide
- Key people: Stephen Squeri (chairman & CEO); Christophe Le Caillec (CFO)
- Revenue: ▲US$72.23 billion (2025)
- Operating income: ▲US$13.79 billion (2025)
- Net income: ▲US$10.83 billion (2025)
- Total assets: ▲US$300.1 billion (2025)
- Total equity: ▲US$33.47 billion (2025)
- Number of employees: 76,800 (2025)
- Subsidiaries: American Express Global Business Travel (33.54%); Resy
- Website: americanexpress.com

American Express Company (Amex) is an American bank holding company and multinational financial services corporation that specializes in payment cards. It is headquartered at 200 Vesey Street, also known as American Express Tower, in the Battery Park City neighborhood of Lower Manhattan; in 2026, the company announced that it would develop and be the sole occupant of the new 2 World Trade Center skyscraper in the nearby World Trade Center complex.

Amex is the fourth-largest card network globally based on purchase volume, behind China UnionPay, Visa, and Mastercard. 141.2 million Amex cards were in force worldwide as of December 31, 2023, with an average annual spend per card member of US$24,059. That year, Amex handled over $1.7 trillion in purchase volume on its network. Amex is the 16th largest US bank, with a total of US$270 billion in assets or 1.1% of all assets insured by the FDIC. It is ranked 58th on the Fortune 500 and 28th on the list of the most valuable brands by Forbes. In 2023, it was ranked 63rd in the Forbes Global 2000. American Express National Bank is a direct bank owned by Amex.

Founded in 1850 as a freight forwarding company, Amex introduced financial and travel services during the early 1900s. It developed its first paper charge card in 1958, gold card in 1966, green card in 1969, platinum card in 1984, and Centurion Card in 1999. The "Don't Leave Home Without It" advertising campaign was introduced in 1975 and renewed in 2005. In the 1980s, Amex acquired and then divested a stake in Shearson. In the 1990s, it stopped reducing interchange fees for merchants who exclusively accepted Amex cards and expanded market share through targeted marketing campaigns. Amex converted to a bank holding company during the 2008 financial crisis. Amex began operating airport lounges in 2013, offering access to certain cardholders.

Amex had a 9% worldwide market share by transaction volume in 2023. While American Express credit cards are accepted at 99% of U.S. merchants that accept credit cards, they are less accepted in Europe and Asia. American Express offers various types of cards including travel and dining cards, everyday spending points cards, and cash back cards. Each category has several card options with different benefits and reward structures. High-profile cards like the Green, Gold, and Platinum cards cater to frequent travelers and diners with perks tailored to these activities.

== History ==
=== Early history ===
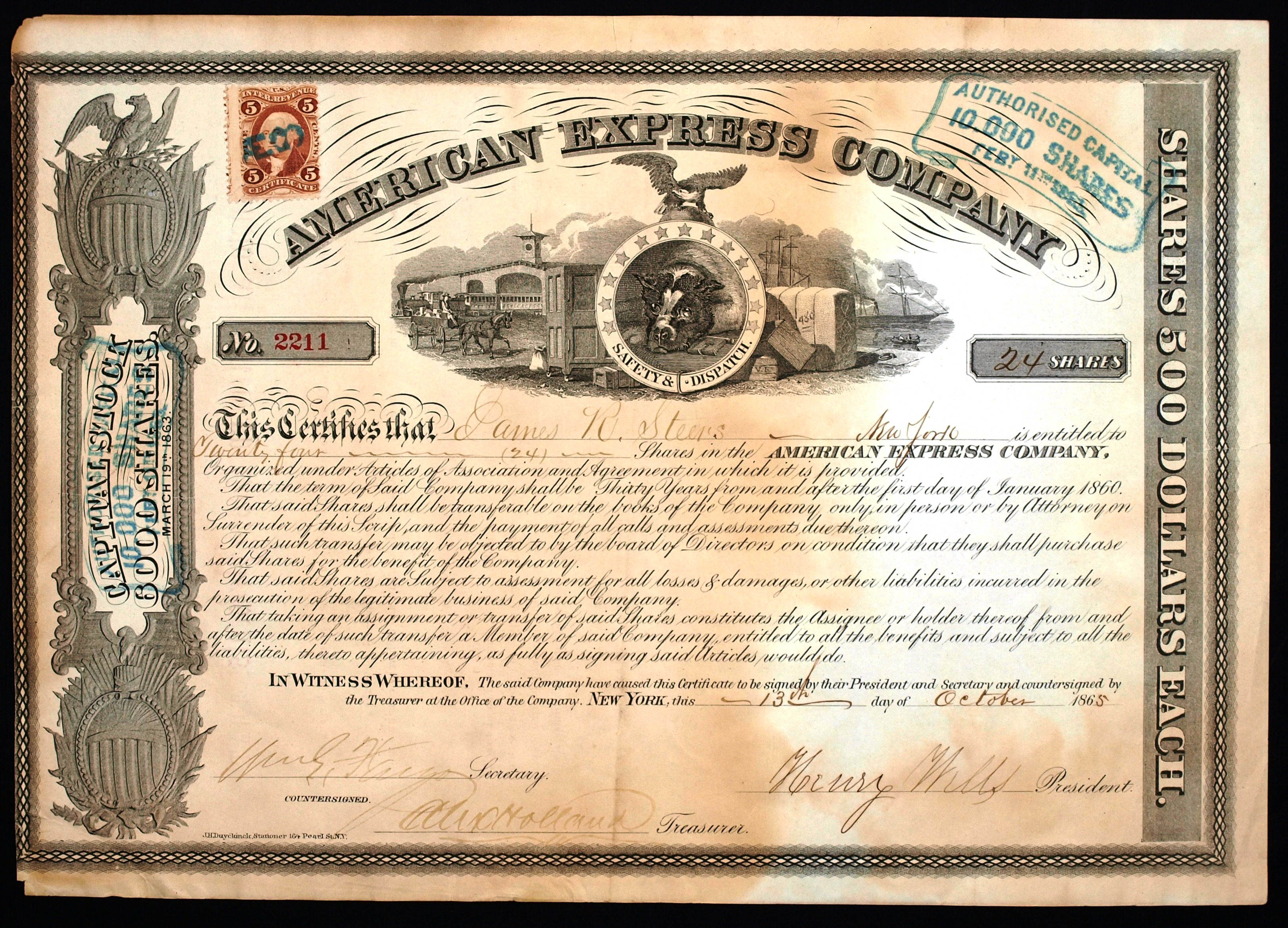
Share of the American Express Company, 1865

In 1850, American Express was started as a freight forwarding company in Buffalo, New York. It was founded as a joint-stock corporation by the merger of the express delivery companies owned by Henry Wells (Wells & Company), William G. Fargo (Livingston, Fargo & Company), and John Warren Butterfield (Butterfield, Wasson & Company). Wells and Fargo also started Wells Fargo & Co. in 1852 when Butterfield and other directors objected to the proposal that American Express extend its operations to California.

==== American Express buildings 1850 to 1986 ====
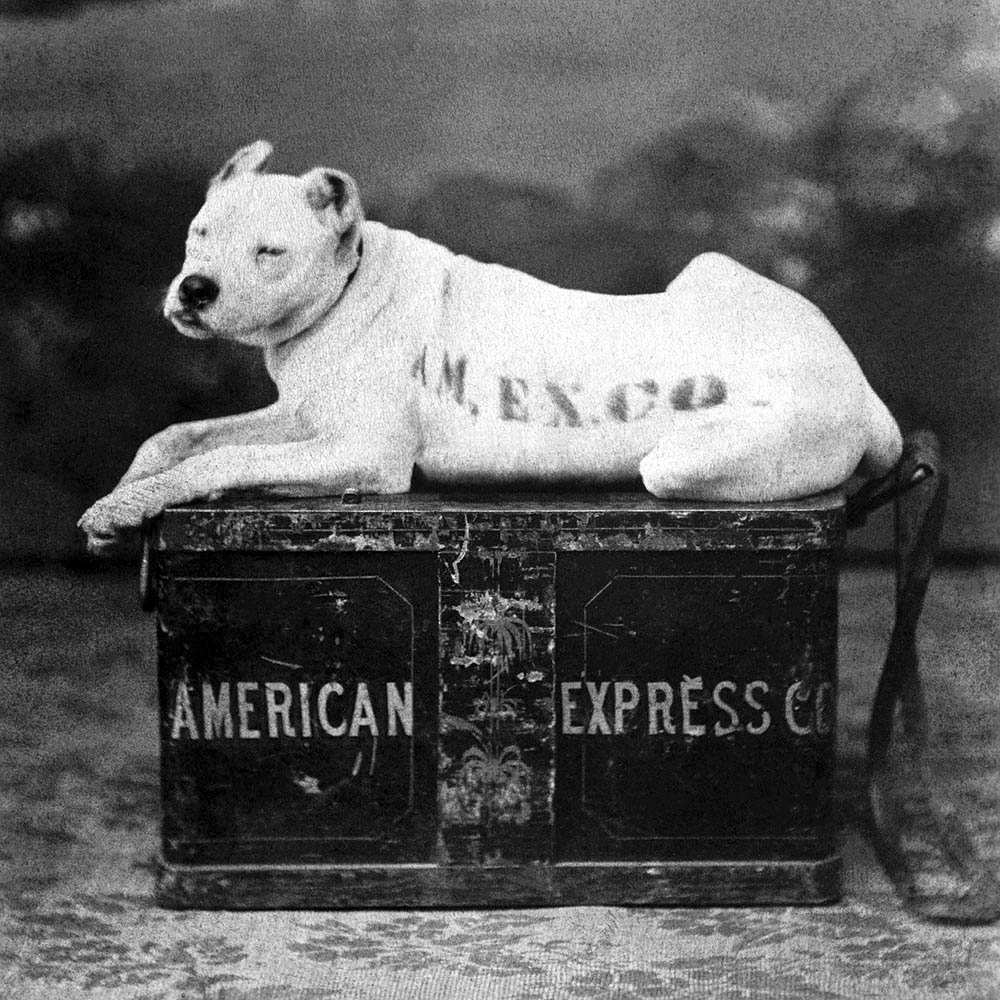
An advert from 1890 featuring a watchdog on an American Express shipping trunk

Founded in Buffalo in 1850, American Express opened its first headquarters in New York City at 10 Wall Street, where its predecessor Wells & Company had been located. The company moved to 62 Broadway in 1853. In 1854, it purchased a lot on Vesey Street to site horse stables for its horse-drawn wagons.

American Express built its first company-owned headquarters at the intersection of Jay Street and Hudson Street, which opened in 1858. It was a marble Italianate palazzo at 55–61 Hudson Street, which had a busy freight depot on the ground story with a spur line from the Hudson River Railroad. A stable was constructed in 1867, five blocks north at 4–8 Hubert Street; in 1898 architect Edward H. Kendall was hired to extend the stables, and he added the American Express bulldog/watchdog logo in terracotta relief on both the Laight and Hubert Street facades of the expanded building.

The company prospered sufficiently that headquarters were moved in 1874 from the wholesale shipping district to the budding Financial District and into rented offices in two five-story brownstone commercial buildings at 63 and 65 Broadway that were owned by the Harmony family. In 1880, American Express built a new warehouse behind the Broadway Building at 46 Trinity Place. The designer is unknown, but it has a façade of brick arches that are reminiscent of pre-skyscraper New York. American Express has long been out of this building, but it still bears a terracotta seal with the American Express bulldog logo. By 1903, the company had assets of some $28 million, second only to the National City Bank of New York among financial institutions in the city. To reflect this, the company purchased the Broadway buildings and site.

Following the retirement of William Fargo's brother J. C. Fargo (1829–1915) in 1914, an aggressive new president, George Chadbourne Taylor (1868–1923) was elected. He had worked his way up through the company over the previous 30 years, and decided to build a new headquarters. The old buildings, dubbed by The New York Times as "among the ancient landmarks" of lower Broadway, had become inadequate for such a rapidly expanding concern. After some delays due to the First World War, the 21-story neo-classical American Express Co. Building was constructed in 1916–17 to the design of J. Lawrence Aspinwall, of the firm of Renwick, Aspinwall & Tucker, the successor to the architectural practice of James Renwick Jr. The building consolidated the two lots of the former buildings with a single address: 65 Broadway. This building was part of the "Express Row" section of lower Broadway at the time. The building completed the continuous masonry wall of its block-front and assisted in transforming Broadway into the "canyon" of neo-classical masonry office towers familiar to this day. After moving to newly purchased international headquarters at 2 New York Plaza in 1975, where it remained until 1986, American Express sold 65 Broadway to the American Bureau of Shipping in 1977, while still retaining travel services on the ground floor of that building.

=== National expansion 1874–1918 ===
For approximately two decades from its founding in 1850, American Express enjoyed a virtual monopoly on the express transport of goods, currency, and securities throughout New York State.

Following its move to larger headquarters at 63 and 65 Broadway in 1874, the company extended its reach nationwide by arranging affiliations with other express companies such as Wells Fargo, railroads, and steamship companies. In 1882, American Express started its expansion in the area of financial services by launching a money order business. Sometime between 1888 and 1890, J. C. Fargo took a trip to Europe and returned frustrated and infuriated. Despite the fact that he was president of American Express and that he carried with him traditional letters of credit, he found it difficult to obtain cash anywhere except in major cities. Fargo went to Marcellus Flemming Berry and asked him to create a better solution than the letter of credit. Berry introduced the American Express Travelers Cheque which was launched in 1891 in denominations of $10, $20, $50, and $100.

American Express Travelers Cheques established the company as a truly international institution. In 1914, at the onset of World War I, American Express was among the few companies to honor the letters of credit, traveller's cheques, and money orders held by Americans stranded in Europe. The British government appointed American Express as its official agent at the beginning of World War I. The company delivered letters, money, and relief parcels to British prisoners of war. Its employees went into camps to cash drafts for both British and French prisoners and arranged for them to receive money from home. By the end of the war American Express was delivering 150 tons of parcels per day to prisoners in six countries.

In 1915, American Express established a travel division and soon established its first travel agency.

=== End of railroad express business in 1918 ===
American Express was one of the monopolies that President Theodore Roosevelt had the Interstate Commerce Commission (ICC) investigate during his administration (1901–1909). The interest of the ICC was drawn to its strict control of the railroad express business. However, the solution did not come immediately to hand. The solution to this problem came as a coincidence to other problems during World War I. During the winter of 1917, the United States suffered a severe coal shortage and on December 26 President Woodrow Wilson commandeered the railroads on behalf of the United States government to move federal troops, their supplies, and coal. Treasury Secretary William Gibbs McAdoo was assigned the task of consolidating the railway lines for the war effort. All contracts between express companies and railroads were nullified and McAdoo proposed that all existing express companies be consolidated into a single company to serve the country's needs. This ended American Express's express business and removed them from the ICC's interest. The result was that a new company called the American Railway Express Company formed in July 1918. The new entity took custody of all the pooled equipment and property of existing express companies (the largest share of which, 40%, came from American Express, who had owned the rights to the express business over 71,280 miles (114,710 km) of railroad lines, and had 10,000 offices, with over 30,000 employees.

=== 1920s–1970s ===
American Express executives discussed the possibility of launching a travel charge card as early as 1946, but it was not until Diners Club launched a card in March 1950, that American Express began to seriously consider the possibility. At the end of 1957, under American Express CEO Ralph Reed the company entered the business and by the launch date of October 1, 1958, public interest had become so significant that 250,000 cards were issued prior to the official launch date. The card was launched with an annual fee of $6, $1 higher than Diners Club, to be seen as a premium product. The first cards were made of paper, with the account number and card member's name typed. In 1959, American Express became the first major issuer to introduce embossed plastic cards.

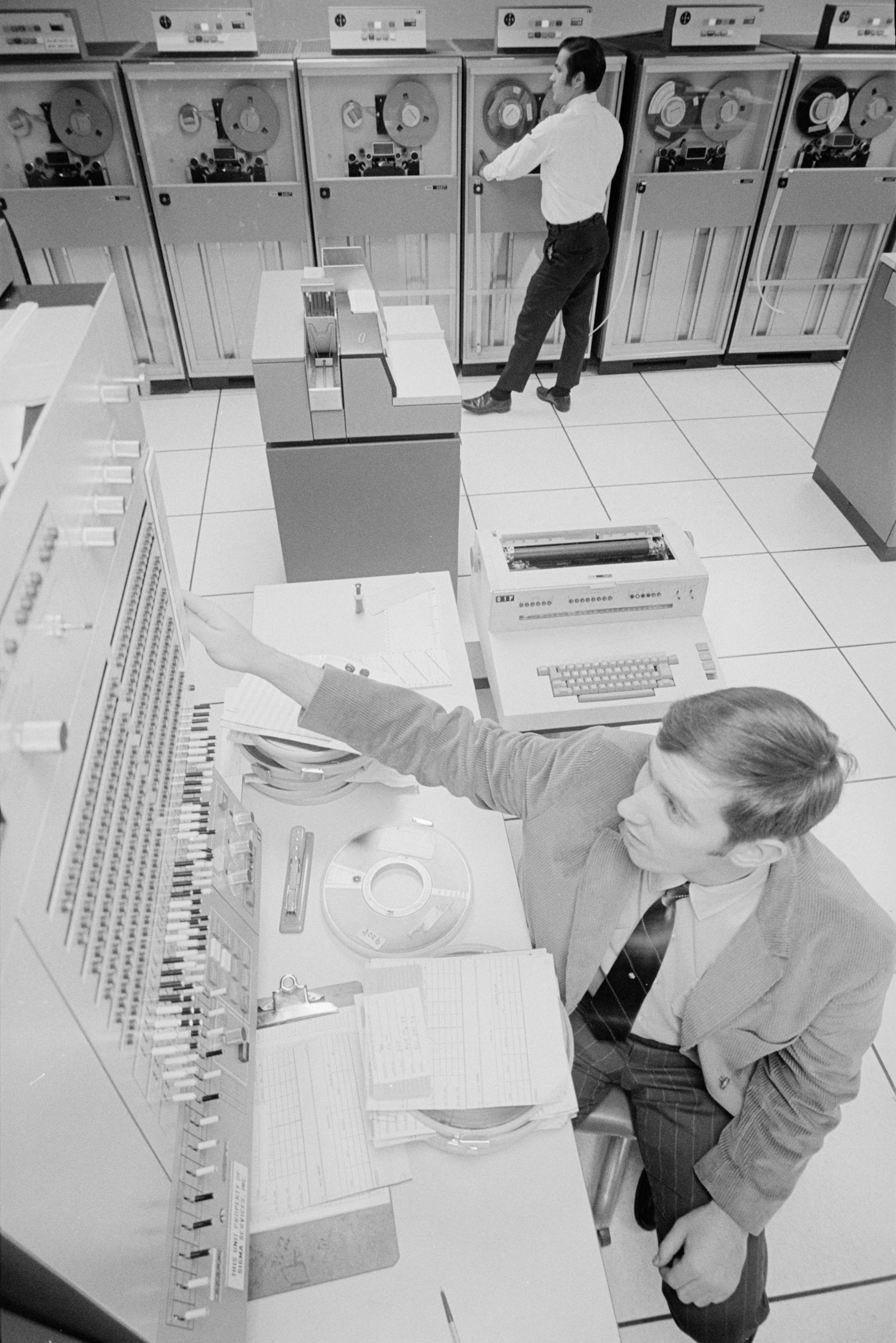
An IBM System/360 in use by American Express, 1969

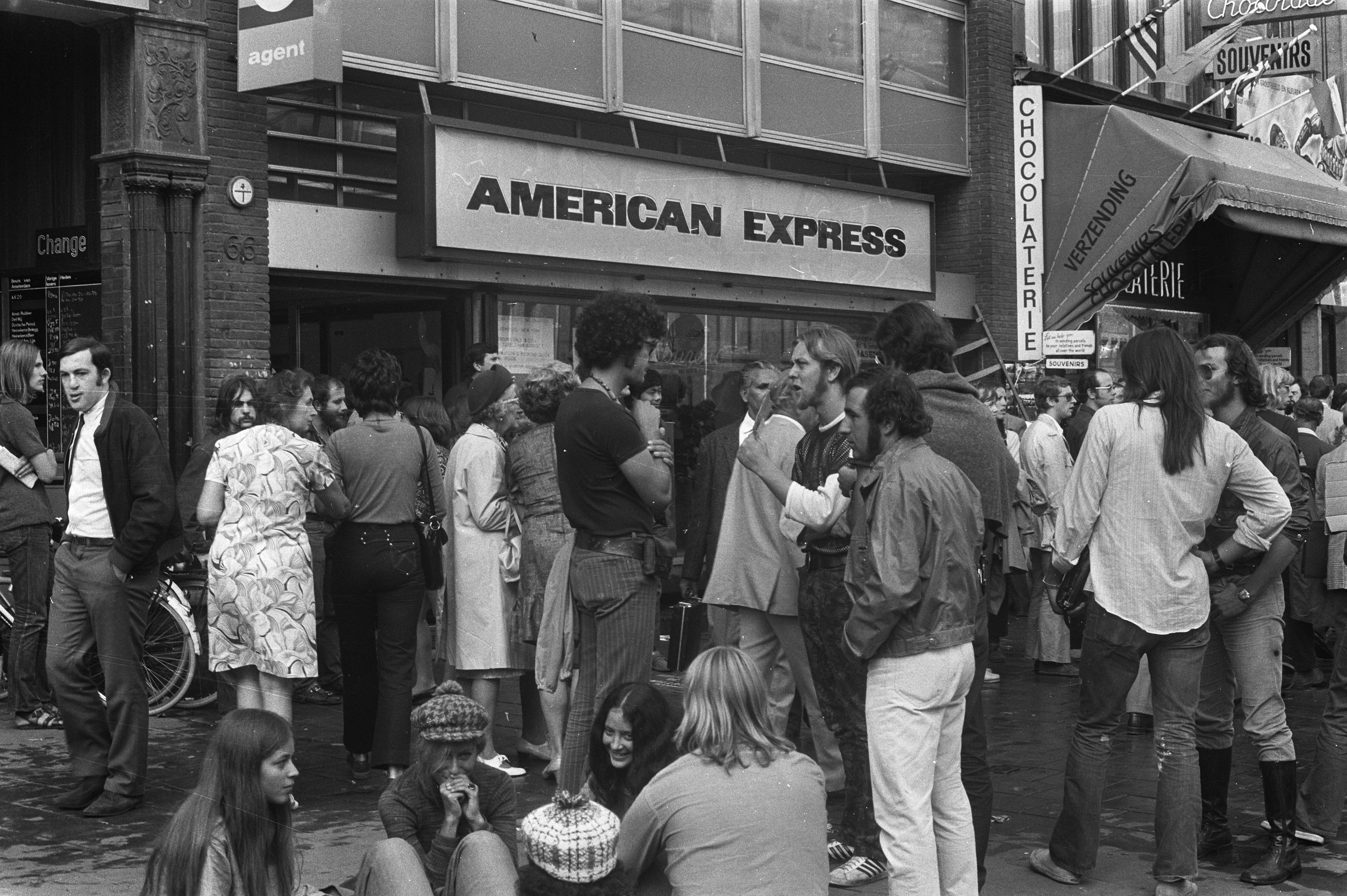
An American Express branch in Amsterdam in 1971

In 1960, Howard L. Clark became president and CEO of the company.

In 1966, American Express introduced the Gold Card for "big-spending members".

In 1977, James D. Robinson III became chairman and CEO of the company.

In 1979, American Express acquired 50% of the cable subsidiary of Warner Communications, forming Warner-Amex Satellite Entertainment, for $175 million in cash and short-term notes. It owned two-thirds of Qube, an experimental two-way cable TV service, along with MTV, Nickelodeon, and The Movie Channel. The venture was unprofitable, and, in 1985, Amex sold its 50% interest back to Warner Communications for $450 million.

=== 1980s ===
In the 1980s, American Express embarked on an effort to become a financial services holding company and made several acquisitions, creating an investment banking arm. In June 1981 it acquired Sanford I. Weill's Shearson Loeb Rhoades, which at the time was Wall Street's second-largest brokerage firm after Merrill Lynch, to form Shearson/American Express. Shearson became an independent subsidiary of American Express, retaining its own management and board of directors, and American Express operated as four principal units: Travel Related Services, Fireman's Fund Insurance Companies, the American Express International Banking Corporation, and Shearson Loeb Rhoades Inc.

After the purchase of Shearson, Weill was given the position of president of American Express in February 1983. Weill eventually grew restless, especially after his proposed private buy-out of the firm's Fireman's Fund Insurance was rejected, and resigned in August 1985. In 1984, American Express acquired Lehman Brothers and added it to the Shearson family, creating Shearson Lehman/American Express. Peter A. Cohen, chairman and CEO of Shearson/American Express, assumed the same posts with the new company. In 1988, Shearson Lehman acquired the E.F. Hutton & Co., a brokerage firm that was merged with the investment banking business. The investment banking arm was renamed Shearson Lehman Hutton, Inc.

In 1983, as part of CEO James Robinson's plan to expand into international banking of wealthy clients, Amex acquired Trade Development Bank of Geneva from Edmond Safra for US$550 million and Safra became a member of the board of directors of Amex. TDB executives were excluded from important company decisions and Safra unsuccessfully tried to repurchase the bank. Safra then opened a competing bank. In response, American Express launched an international smear campaign against Safra by inaccurately reporting to news and media outlets in that Safra was being investigated by the FBI for being involved in the Iran–Contra affair, along with drug trafficking and the mafia. All of the accusations were confirmed to be false and led to the resignation of Harry L. Freeman, public relations chief of American Express, after admitting to the entire scandal. In July 1989, American Express publicly apologized to Edmond Safra and donated $8 million to the charity of his choice. In 1990, American Express sold its Swiss banking operations to Compagnie de Banque et d'Investissements, which led to the creation of Union Bancaire Privée (UBP).

To move into a middle market that neither its Shearson brokerage arm nor its travel and entertainment card operation generally served, in 1984 American Express completed its acquisition of Investors Diversified Services (IDS), a major marketer of insurance and mutual funds with a sales force of 4,500 agents managing $16.6 billion in assets, and in 1995 renamed it American Express Financial Advisors.

In 1984, Amex launched the Platinum Card, billed as an "ultra-exclusive" credit card with a $250 annual fee. It was offered by invitation only to American Express customers with at least two years of tenure, significant spending, and excellent payment history.

In 1987, American Express introduced the Optima card, its first credit card product that did not have to be paid in full at the end of the month.

=== 1990s ===
In 1991, a group of restaurants in Boston, including some that were exclusive to Amex, stopped accepting American Express while accepting and encouraging the use of Visa and Mastercard. The rationale was due to far lower fees as compared to American Express' fees at the time (which were about 4% for each transaction versus around 1.2% for Visa and Mastercard). The revolt, known as the "Boston Fee Party" (alluding to the Boston Tea Party), spread to restaurants across the United States, including in cities such as New York City, Chicago, and Los Angeles. Visa offered to pay the Fee Party's legal bills. Kenneth Chenault, then head of the firm's United States Consumer Card Group, cut fees to bring these restaurants back into the fold. American Express was, at the time, known for cutting its interchange fee to merchants and restaurants if they accepted only American Express and no other credit or charge cards. This prompted competitors such as Visa and Mastercard to file complaints as the tactics gave Amex exclusivity at restaurants. Capitalizing on this elitist image, American Express frequently mentioned such exclusive partnerships in its advertising. Aside from some holdouts including Neiman Marcus, which continued exclusivity until 2011, the practice largely ended in 1991.

In April 1992, American Express spun off First Data in an initial public offering.

In 1993, Harvey Golub became CEO of American Express. That year, American Express negotiated the sale of Shearson's retail brokerage and investment management business to Primerica. The Shearson business was merged with Primerica's Smith Barney to create Smith Barney Shearson.

In June 1994, American Express completed the spin-off of its remaining investment banking and institutional businesses as Lehman Brothers, ending its foray into the brokerage business.

In September 1994, the Optima True Grace card was introduced. The card was unique in that it offered a grace period on all purchases whether a balance was carried on the card or not, not charging interest on new purchases immediately for cards with unpaid balances. The card was discontinued a few years later.

In 1998, Amex launched the Blue credit card, targeted at young adults, in the UK after testing it in other countries. The card had a smart chip and users were encouraged to pay bills and get information via the company website. It launched in the U.S. in 1999. A television media campaign for Blue adopted the 1979 UK Synthpop hit "Cars" by Gary Numan as its theme music.

In 1999, American Express introduced the high-fee Centurion Card, often referred to as the "black card", which caters to an even more affluent customer segment. The card was initially available only to select users of the Platinum card. American Express created the card line amid rumors and urban legends in the 1980s that it produced an ultra-exclusive black card for elite users who could purchase anything with it.

=== 2000 to 2009 ===
In December 2000, American Express agreed to acquire the $226 million credit card portfolio of Bank of Hawaii, then a division of Pacific Century Financial Corporation. In January 2006, American Express sold its Bank of Hawaii card portfolio to MBNA America Bank.

Until 2004, Visa and Mastercard rules prohibited issuers of their cards from issuing American Express cards in the United States. This meant, as a practical matter, that U.S. banks could not issue American Express cards. These rules were struck down as a result of antitrust litigation brought by the United States Department of Justice. In January 2004, American Express reached a deal to have its cards issued by MBNA. Initially decried by Mastercard executives as nothing but an "experiment", the cards were issued beginning in October 2004. An agreement was reached regarding the acquisition of MBNA by Bank of America whereby Bank of America owned the customer loans and American Express processed the transactions. American Express dismissed Bank of America from its antitrust litigation against Visa, Mastercard, and other banks. The first card from the partnership, the Bank of America Rewards American Express card, was released on June 30, 2006.

In June 2005, American Express introduced ExpressPay, a contactless payment system based on wireless RFID. In July 2005, American Express issued the American Express Travelers Cheque Card, a stored-value card that serves the same purposes as an American Express Travelers Cheque, but can be used in stores like a credit card. Amex discontinued the card in October 2007.

On September 30, 2005, American Express completed the corporate spin-off of its American Express Financial Advisors unit, Ameriprise Financial, to its shareholders. In late 2005, H&R Block acquired American Express Tax & Business Services and then combined it with its RSM McGladrey Business Services Inc. subsidiary.

In 2006, the UK division of American Express joined the Product Red coalition and issued a Red Card, donating with each purchase through The Global Fund to Fight AIDS, Tuberculosis and Malaria to help African women and children with HIV/AIDS, malaria, and other diseases.

In late 2007, the company announced the Plum Card for small business owners.

In March 2008, American Express acquired the Corporate Payment Services business of General Electric, which primarily focused on providing purchasing card solutions for large global clients, for $1.1 billion in cash. The transaction added V-Payment to its product portfolio. V-Payment enables a tightly controlled, single-use card number.

In March 2008, Standard Chartered Bank acquired American Express Bank Ltd, the international banking subsidiary of American Express for $823 million.

On November 10, 2008, during the 2008 financial crisis, the company received Federal Reserve System approval to convert to a bank holding company, making it eligible for government assistance under the Troubled Asset Relief Program (TARP). At that time, American Express had total consolidated assets of about $127 billion. In June 2009, $3.39 billion in TARP funds were repaid plus $74.4 million in dividend payments. In July 2009, the company ended its obligations under TARP by buying back $340 million in Treasury warrants. As part of the conversion, the company reduced or closed many business lines of credit.

In 2009, American Express introduced the ZYNC charge card, a white card targeting young adults. The card was later discontinued.

=== 2010 to 2019 ===
In November 2011, Neiman Marcus, which gave general-purpose card exclusivity to American Express since the 1980s, began accepting cards using the Visa and Mastercard payment networks. In 2011, Amex launched the Blue Cash Preferred Card credit card.

In October 2013, Amex sold most of its publications: Travel + Leisure, Food & Wine, Executive Travel, Black Ink, and Departures magazines, to Time Inc. Time restructured the publications, which are now owned by Dotdash Meredith.

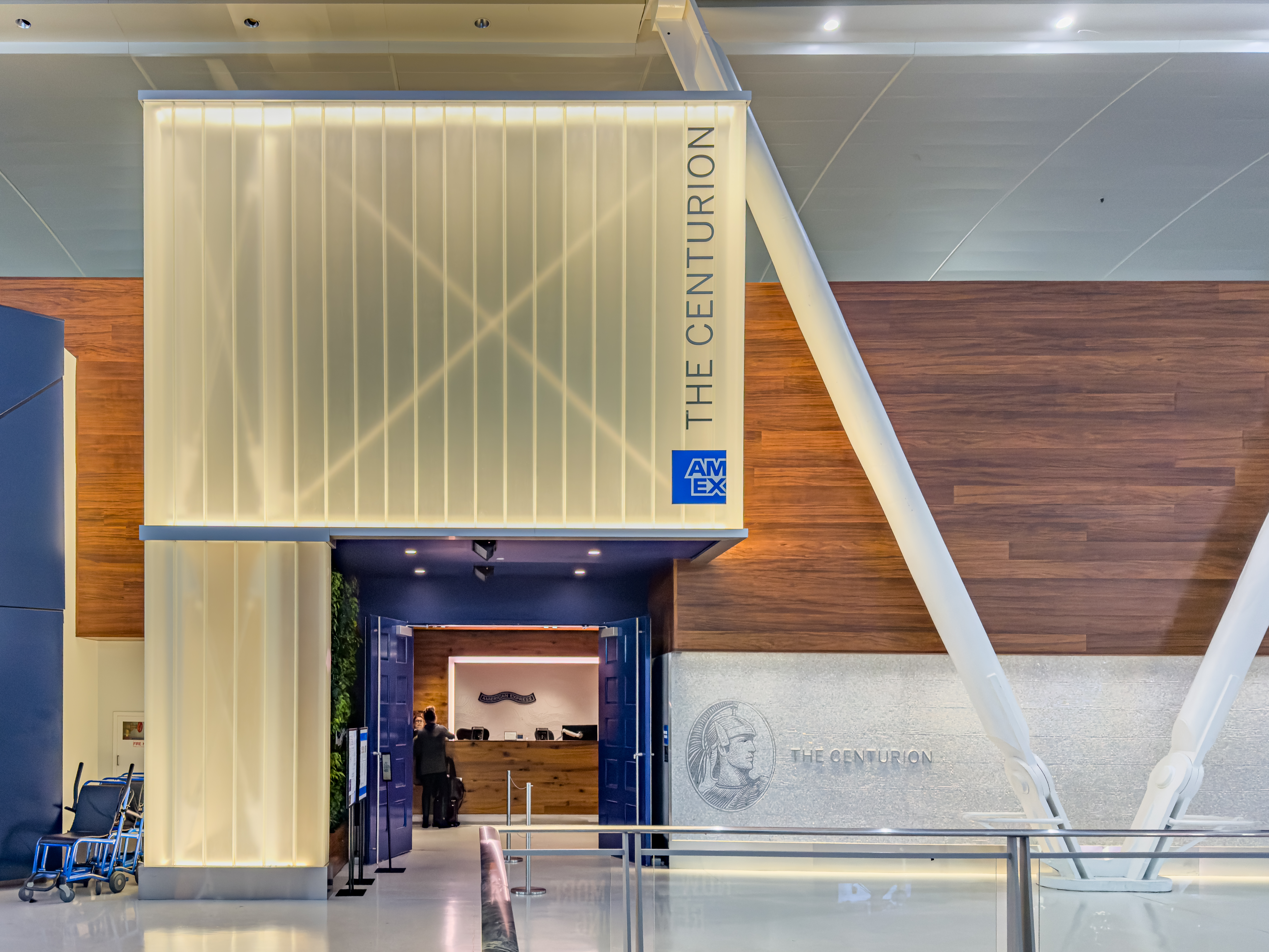
American Express Centurion Lounge at Terminal 4 in JFK Airport (2025)

In 2013, the company opened its first airport lounge, offering access to certain cardmembers; the lounge network is branded Centurion Lounge.

In March 2014, American Express announced the corporate spin-off its corporate travel business as American Express Global Business Travel via the sale of 50% of its stake in the business to an investor group led by Certares LP for $900 million.

Effective in 2016 in the United States, and in 2015 in Canada, Costco ended its relationship with Amex that had provided co-branded Costco membership cards since 2004. The cards issued by Costco in the United States were an extension of an exclusive deal between Costco and American Express dating from 1999. Costco was the last major U.S. merchant that accepted American Express cards exclusively. Costco's Canadian stores ended its exclusive deal with American Express in January 2015, in favor of one with Capital One and Mastercard. Citigroup became the exclusive issuer of Costco's credit cards and Visa replaced American Express as the exclusive credit card accepted at Costco's stores in the United States. All TrueEarnings card accounts and balances held by American Express were sold to Citigroup, and new Costco Anywhere Visa cards were sent to Costco members prior to the switch date. At the time, the Costco partnership represented 8%, or $80 billion, of American Express' billed business and about 20%, or about $14 billion, of its interest-bearing credit portfolio. The impact of losing the Costco card accounts was significant; in the first quarter without Costco cards, company profit dropped 10% and revenue dropped 5% compared to the previous year.

On March 1, 2017, ANZ announced that it was no longer issuing American Express cards, with them phased out entirely by August 5, 2017. In October 2017, American Express established a joint venture company, LianTong (连通), in China to operate its payment card brand locally. In June 2020, it obtained a local bank card clearing business license in China.

In February 2018, Stephen Squeri succeeded the retiring Kenneth Chenault as chairman and CEO of the company.

In 2018, the Gold Card was converted to a credit card for UK residents, but remains a charge card in the U.S.

In March 2019, American Express acquired LoungeBuddy, a provider which offers pay-per-use access to select airport lounges worldwide. Also in March 2019, Amex reduced its presence in the European Union, due to changes to the EU's banking regulations. In July 2019, Amex acquired Acompay, a digital payment automation platform. In August 2019, American Express completed its acquisition of the restaurant-reservation platform Resy, and integrated it into its mobile app as an offering for rewards card members. In September 2019, Pedestrian Group acquired American Express Openair Cinemas, which facilitated outdoor showings of films at 10 locations in Australia and New Zealand and was operated by Fairfax Events.

=== 2020 to present ===
In 2020, American Express acquired Kabbage. In June 2021, the company's first checking account for small businesses, Kabbage Checking, was launched. American Express also offers credit lines of $1,000 to $150,000 for small businesses, using Kabbage's automated underwriting software. In January 2023, the Kabbage brand was renamed American Express Business Blueprint.

In October 2021, Amex launched full-service business checking for small and mid-sized businesses under the American Express brand.

In March 2022, following the Russian invasion of Ukraine and related sanctions, American Express suspended all operations in Russia and Belarus.

In 2023, the company undertook a restructuring, costing up to $277 million.

In June 2024, Amex acquired Tock, a restaurant reservation platform, further expanding its portfolio in dining reservations following its earlier acquisition of Resy. At the time of the Tock acquisition Amex also acquired Rooam, a contactless-payment platform used in bars, restaurants, stadiums, and other venues.

In September 2025, American Express increased its annual fee for its Platinum card for the first time since 2021, raising it to $895 from $695. The company announced new benefits for cardholders including statement credits for Lululemon, Oura Ring, Resy restaurants and an Uber One membership. It also increased credits for luxury hotel stays, streaming subscriptions (including the addition of Paramount+, YouTube Premium and YouTube TV) and a Clear membership.

== Financial history ==
American Express revenue and net income in billion US$
Year	Revenue	Net income
2025	72.2	10.8
2024	65.9	10.1
2023	60.5	8.4
2022	55.6	7.4
2021	43.6	7.9
2020	38.1	3.0
2019	47.0	6.6
2018	43.2	6.7
2017	38.9	2.6
2016	37.1	5.2
2015	34.4	5.0
2014	35.8	5.8
2013	34.8	5.3
2012	33.7	4.4
2011	32.2	4.8
2010	30.0	4.0
2009	26.5	2.1

== Products ==
=== Specialized cards for businesses ===
American Express has a specialized corporate meeting credit card. Another specialized American Express business card is the American Express Corporate Purchasing Card, which can be assigned to individual employees or departments. Reconciliation and accounting services are available to make these functions easier for the corporation.

=== Non-proprietary cards ===
Citibank, First National Bank of Omaha, USAA, Navy Federal Credit Union, Synchrony Financial, and US Bancorp issue American Express cards. Citi issues the Macy's and Bloomingdale's American Express cards along with Citi-branded cards. US Bancorp issues American Express-branded cards for US Bank along with Elan Card Services, a subsidiary that issues credit cards on behalf of small to midsize banks. Some credit unions, including Pentagon Federal Credit Union, also issue American Express cards. Until August 2023, Wells Fargo issued American Express cards under its own brand and for Dillard's. JPMorgan Chase and Wells Fargo are the only Big Four banks in the U.S. that do not partner with American Express.

== Marketing and advertising ==
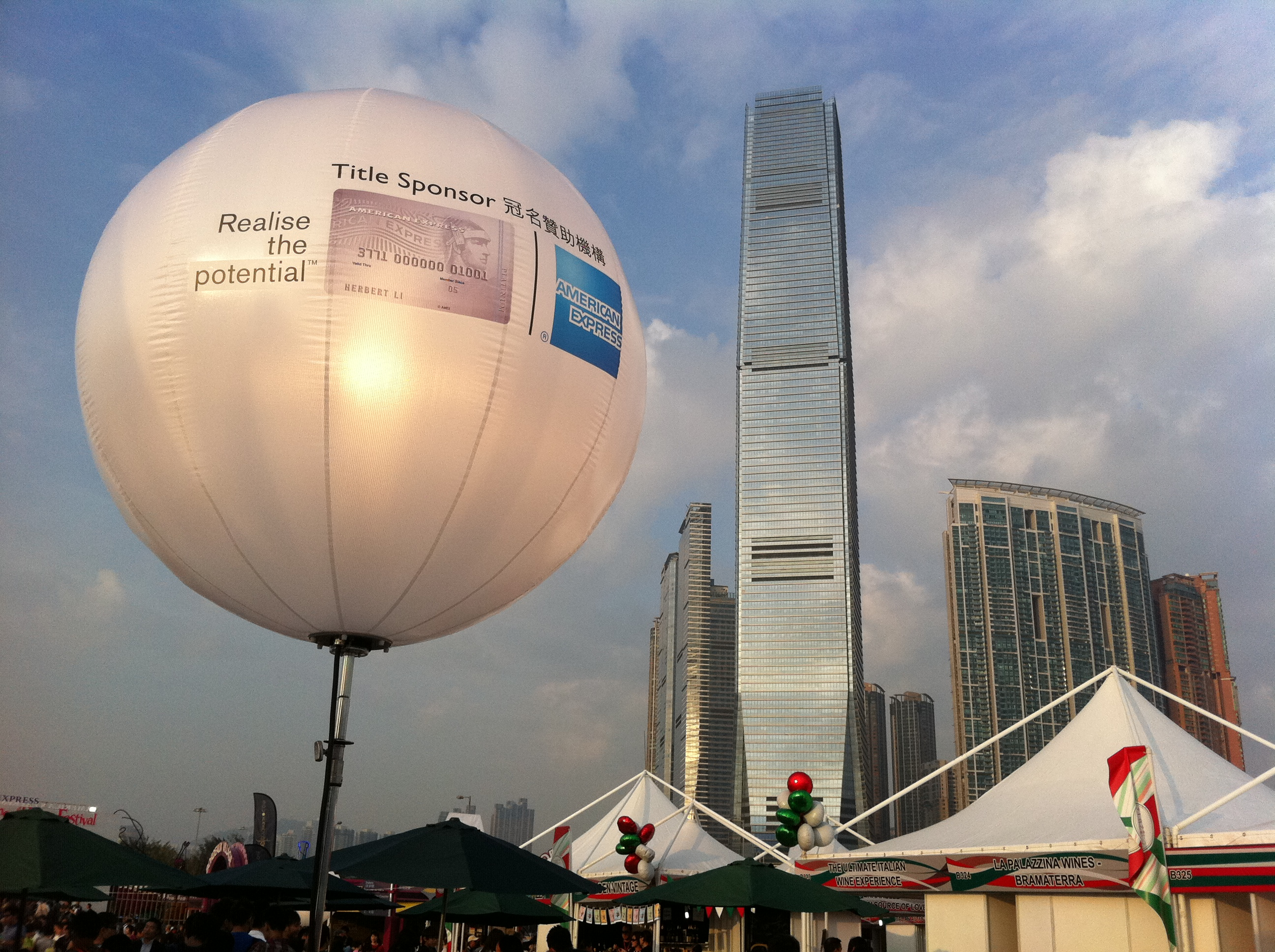
An advertisement for the Platinum Credit Card in Hong Kong, 2012

=== Card design ===
The company logo, a gladiator or centurion, appears at the center of several cards. The figure and his pose evoke classical antiquity, demonstrate strength and stability, and the designs on these cards, especially the Green card, bear resemblance to those on the United States Federal Reserve Notes.

=== Advertising campaigns ===
==== "Don't Leave Home Without Them" ====
In 1975, the advertising firm Ogilvy & Mather developed the highly successful ad campaign tagline "Don't Leave Home Without Them" for American Express Travelers Cheques. The ad campaign featured Academy Award-winning actor Karl Malden, and the ads ran during the rest of the 1970s and on into the 1980s; Malden's last television ad for the company aired in 1994. In the UK, the spokesman was Alan Whicker, a television personality.

In 1975 Ogilvy & Mather also developed taglines for the Amex credit card: "Don't leave home without it" and "Do you know me?" The ads usually featured a semi-famous person whose face the audience might not recognize, until their name was shown on the credit card. These ads and taglines ran for over a decade.

==== The Adventures of Seinfeld & Superman ====
The Adventures of Seinfeld & Superman

American Express uses celebrities in advertising. Some notable examples include a late 1990s ad campaign with comedian Jerry Seinfeld and comic book superhero Superman (voiced by Patrick Warburton), including two 2004 webisodes in a series entitled "The Adventures of Seinfeld & Superman".

==== "My life. My card. / Are You a Cardmember?" ====
In late 2004, American Express launched the "My life. My card." brand campaign, and later the "Are You a Cardmember?" brand campaign in 2007, both by Ogilvy & Mather, featuring celebrities that use American Express cards including:

- Actors: Kate Winslet, Robert De Niro, Ken Watanabe, and Tina Fey;
- Duke University basketball coach Mike Krzyzewski;
- Fashion designers Collette Dinnigan and Diane von Fürstenberg;
- Comedian and talk show hostess Ellen DeGeneres;
- Golfer Tiger Woods;
- Professional snowboarder Shaun White;
- Tennis pros Venus Williams, Andy Roddick, and Andre Agassi;
- Surfer Laird Hamilton;
- Chelsea manager José Mourinho;
- Film directors Martin Scorsese, Wes Anderson, and M. Night Shyamalan;
- Singers Sheryl Crow, Alicia Keys and Beyoncé

==== Animals ====
In 2007, a two-minute black-and-white ad, titled "Animals" and starring Ellen DeGeneres, won the Emmy Award for Outstanding Commercial.

==== C. F. Frost ====
Many American Express credit card ads feature a sample American Express Card with the name "C. F. Frost" on the front, a nod to Charles F. Frost, an advertising executive at Ogilvy & Mather.

=== Cause marketing ===
American Express was one of the earliest users of cause marketing, to great success. A 1983 promotion advertised that for each purchase made with an American Express Card, American Express would contribute one penny to the renovation of the Statue of Liberty. The campaign generated contributions of $1.7 million to the Statue of Liberty restoration project. What would soon capture the attention of marketing departments of major corporations was that the promotion generated approximately a 28% increase in American Express card usage by consumers.

In May 2007, American Express launched an initiative called the Members Project. Cardholders were invited to submit ideas for projects, and were told American Express was funding the winning project.

In 2010, the company founded Small Business Saturday in the U.S., to encourage holiday shoppers to patronize brick and mortar businesses that are small and local. The success of the annual initiative also sparked the creation and sponsorship of an annual Small Business Saturday (UK) beginning in December 2013.

=== Sponsorship ===
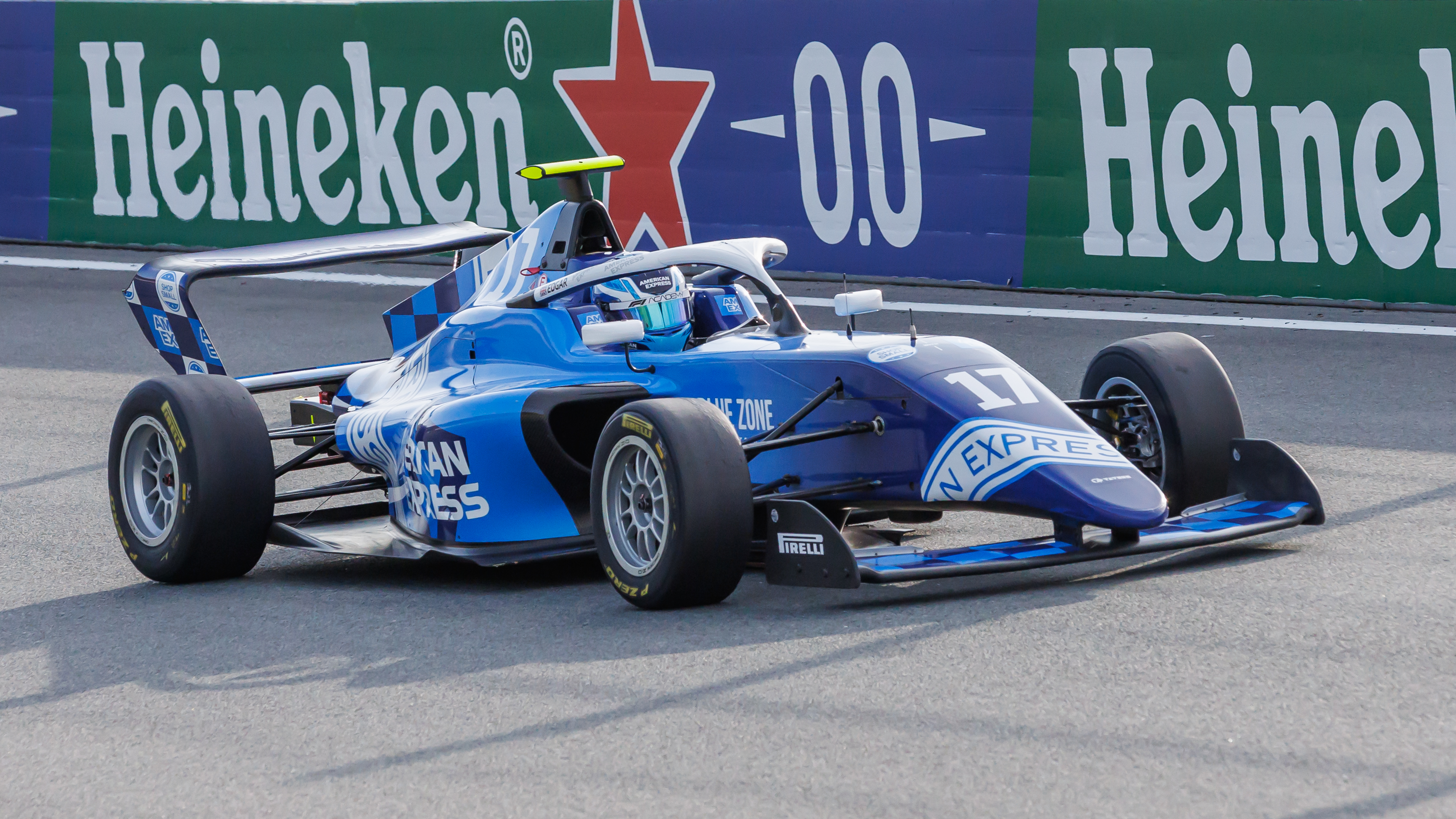
The American Express-supported F1 Academy car

Since 2011, American Express has a £100 million sponsorship agreement with Brighton & Hove Albion Football Club. The agreement includes naming rights over Falmer Stadium (renaming it as the American Express Stadium), Brighton training facilities and shirt sponsorship of the kits of the men's, women's, youth and disability teams.

In May 2024, American Express became an official partner for F1 Academy, a female-only single-seater racing series founded by Formula One; the partnership deal, which was subsequently expanded to multi-year support, includes American Express's branding on the sponsored driver's car livery and driver suit each year.

== Awards and recognition ==
In 2016, at the Corporate Art Awards, American Express received the award from pptArt for "the best international restoration programme: World's Monument Watch". American Express is a sponsor of "World Monuments Watch", launched in 1995 by World Monuments Fund.

The company has consistently ranked highly on lists of best companies to work for compiled by Fortune and Mediacorp Canada Inc.

== Offices ==
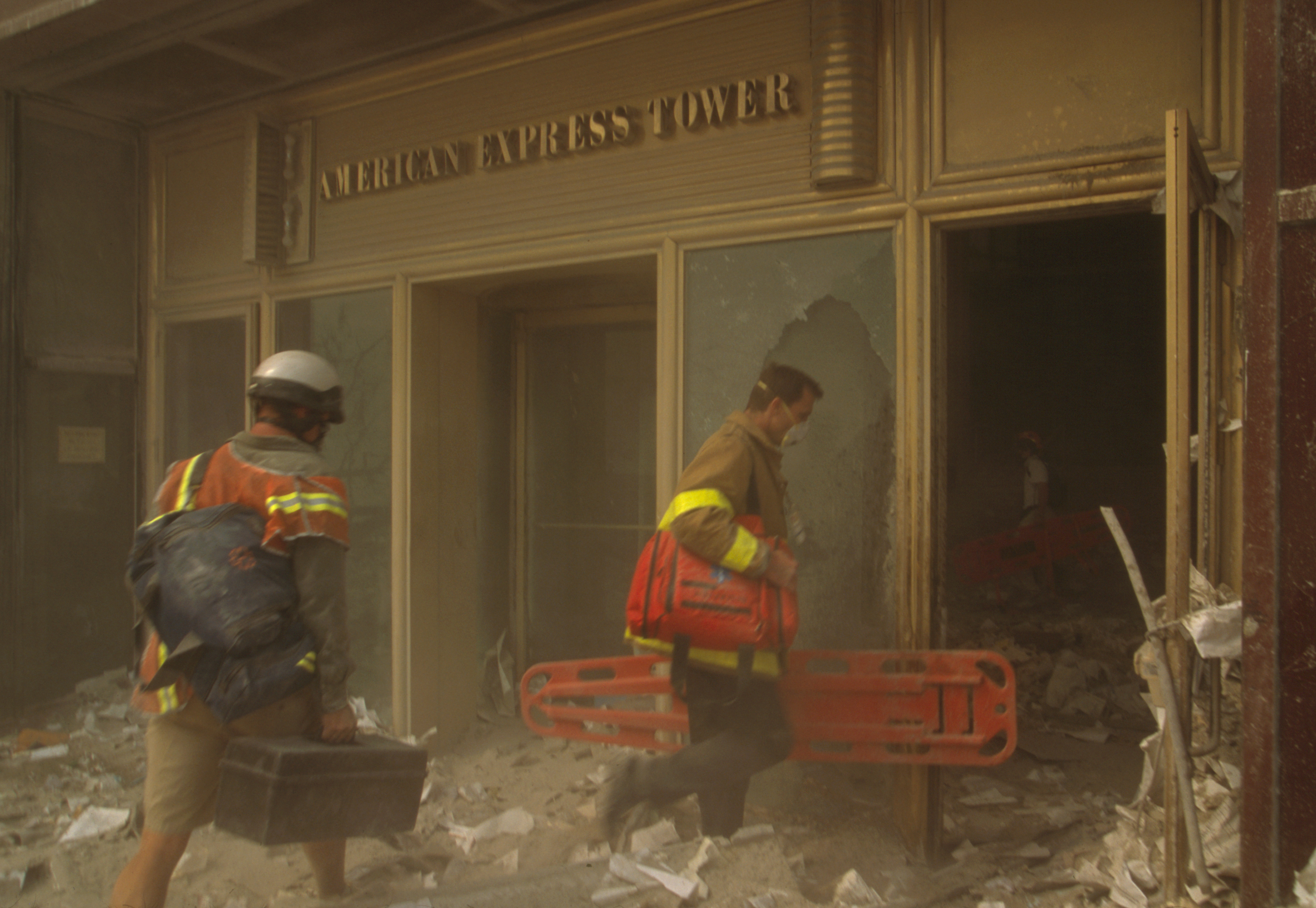
Two rescue workers entering the American Express Tower following September 11 terrorist attack on World Trade Center, 2001

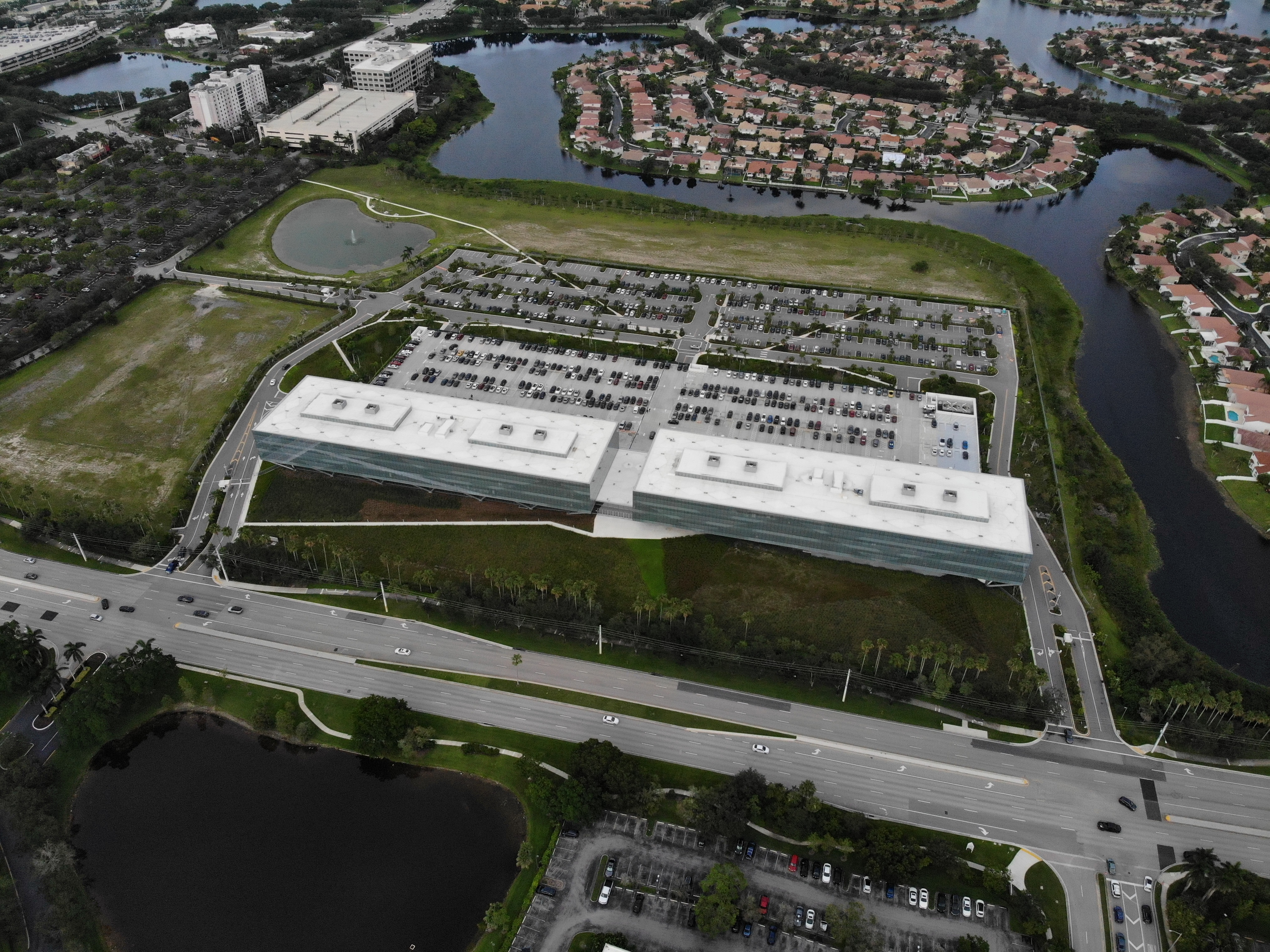
American Express regional HQ in Sunrise, Florida

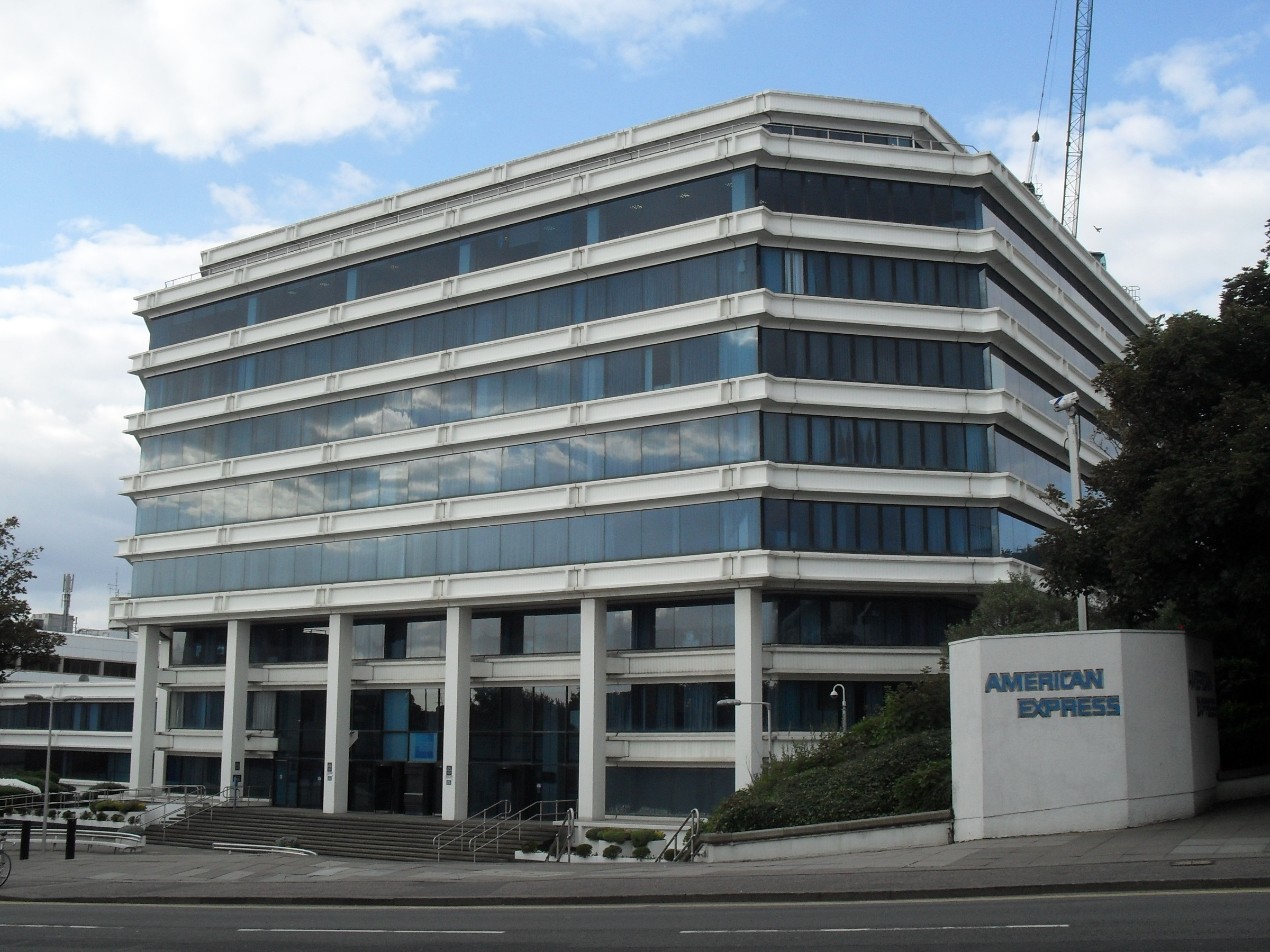
Former Amex House in Brighton, England, was built in 1977.

=== National ===
In April 1986, American Express moved its headquarters to the 51-story Three World Financial Center at 200 Vesey Street in New York City. After the September 11 attacks, American Express had to leave its headquarters temporarily because it was located directly opposite the World Trade Center and was damaged during the fall of the towers; it began gradually moving back into its rehabilitated building in 2002.

In the U.S. the company maintains major offices in Sunrise, Florida; Salt Lake City, Utah; and Phoenix, Arizona – with its main data centers in North Carolina and Phoenix.

American Express announced its new state-of-the-art global headquarters at 2 World Trade Center in Lower Manhattan on February 25, 2026. The company will be the sole owner and occupant of the new building, which is expected to be completed in 2031.

=== International ===
American Express, which had established its first Canadian offices in 1853, in Toronto and Hamilton, Ontario, first applied to open a Canadian bank in August, 1986. Amex Bank of Canada was created via an Order in Council by the Brian Mulroney government on November 21, 1988. This decision was not without controversy, as Canadian banking policy at the time would not ordinarily have permitted American Express to operate as a bank, since at the time Amex did not operate as a regulated bank holding company in the U.S. Amex Bank of Canada began operations on July 1, 1990. It is a member of the Canadian Bankers Association (CBA) and a registered member of the Canada Deposit Insurance Corporation (CDIC), the federal agency insuring deposits at all of Canada's chartered banks.

American Express has several offices in the UK, including a European Service Center in the Carlton Hill area of Brighton, England. The building was completed in 2012. It replaced American Express's former building, Amex House, a large white tower block built in 1977 and surrounded by several other smaller offices around the city. The American Express European Service Center deals with card servicing, sales, fraud and merchant servicing. Official Europe, Middle East, and Africa HQ is located in the Belgravia district of Westminster, in central London, at Belgrave House on Buckingham Palace Road, SW1; other UK offices are based in Sussex at Burgess Hill and Manchester. In November 2009, Brighton and Hove City Council granted planning permission for American Express to redevelop the Amex House site.

The Japan, Asia-Pacific, and Australian Headquarters are co-located in Singapore, at 16 Collyer Quay, and in Sydney's King Street Wharf area. The headquarters of Latin America and Caribbean division is in Fort Lauderdale, Florida.

American Express also has a significant presence in India. Its two centers are located at Gurgaon, Haryana (Cyber City) and Bangalore, Karnataka (Bagmane capital).The Indian operations of American Express revolve around the back office customer services operations apart from the credit card business for the domestic Indian Economy, arguably the American Express campus in Gurgaon is the largest employee location by headcount for Amex and supports business continuity objectives of Amex including during Hurricane Sandy, the center works 24/7 and includes a co-located second building which was recently transferred to a third party service provider but does much work for Amex.

== List of CEOs ==
1. Henry Wells (1850–1868)
2. William Fargo (1868–1881)
3. J. C. Fargo (1881–1914)
4. George C. Taylor (1914–1923)
5. Frederick P. Small (1923–1944)
6. Ralph Reed (1944–1960)
7. Howard L. Clark Sr. (1960–1977)
8. James D. Robinson III (1977–1993)
9. Harvey Golub (1993–2001)
10. Kenneth Chenault (2001–2018)
11. Stephen Squeri (2018–present)

== Legal and regulatory issues ==
In November 2010, the UK division of American Express was cautioned by the Office of Fair Trading for the use of controversial charging orders against those in debt. The company was one of four companies who were allegedly encouraging customers to turn their unsecured credit card debts into a form of secured debt.

In October 2012, The Consumer Financial Protection Bureau (CFPB) required three American Express subsidiaries to refund an estimated $85 million to approximately 250,000 customers for illegal card practices between 2003 and 2012. Allegations included that American Express made misleading statements regarding signup bonuses, charged unlawful late fees, discriminated against applicants due to age, and failed to report consumer complaints to regulators. Also in October 2012, American Express and Walmart announced the launch of Bluebird, a prepaid debit card with roadside assistance and identity theft protection that can also be used as a substitute for a traditional transactional account whereby users can have payments deposited to the account and have insurance from the Federal Deposit Insurance Corporation.

A lawsuit that had been brought by the U.S. Justice Department and several states in 2010 against American Express, over the credit card rules the company imposed on merchants, moved forward to trial in 2014. The suit claimed that charging high fees to merchants was a violation of the Sherman Antitrust Act. and that American Express charges significantly higher merchant fees than other credit card providers. In January 2017, the 2nd U.S. Circuit Court of Appeals affirmed a lower court ruling that American Express could block merchants that accept its cards from steering customers to other cards, like those offered by Visa and Mastercard. In June 2018, in Ohio v. American Express Co., the Supreme Court of the United States affirmed the 2nd Circuit's ruling.

In January 2021, the United States Department of the Treasury, the Federal Deposit Insurance Corporation, and the Federal Reserve launched an investigation into whether the company had misled potential corporate customers and used aggressive tactics while selling American Express cards in 2015 and 2016. In July 2023, Amex agreed to pay $15 million to the U.S. Treasury to settle an investigation accusing the company of failing to govern and oversee a third-party affiliate and for violation of regulations in efforts to retain small business customers. As an additional result of the investigations, in January 2025 American Express agreed to pay a total of approximately $230 million in civil and federal penalties and fines for deceptive sales tactics, which also included fines from a Department of Justice wire-fraud probe.

In October 2025, merchants agreed to a $231.7 million settlement before a U.S. District Judge, as B & R Supermarket, Inc., et al v. Visa, Inc. et al, for costs imposed in frauds related to counterfeit, lost, or stolen cards, with American Express agreeing to pay $20 million of the total settlement.

In May 2026, the Industrial Court of Malaysia ruled that American Express Malaysia had wrongfully dismissed an employee, former senior credit specialist Kuhendran s/o Rajan. Kuhendran joined the company in 2014 and had endured workplace bullying and harassment from his supervisor, Vijay s/o K. Jayadevan Nair. After raising concerns over toxic workplace conduct in 2015, Kuhendran was given warning letters while no action was taken against Vijay. In 2022, Kuhendran sent a letter of demand to the company's headquarters to intervene but was instead issued a show-cause letter for poor performance and misconduct and was later dismissed. In its ruling, the court found evidence that Vijay had openly used sexually charged, highly derogatory and demeaning words against employees through the office messaging system, and that the company was more interested in protecting Vijay rather than addressing Kuhendran's grievances. Kuhendran was awarded RM114,000 in back wages and RM39,200 as compensation in lieu of reinstatement.

In October 2026, American Express was fined $350 million for failing to catch and report money laundering in its system.

== See also ==
- 1995 "Gold Card Dress" of Lizzy Gardiner
- Credit score in the United States
- Banking in the United States
