= Expressman =

Person responsible for a cargo

An expressman (pl. expressmen) refers to anyone who has the duty of packing, managing, and ensuring the delivery of any cargo.

During the late 19th and early 20th centuries, an expressman was someone whose responsibility it was to ensure the safe delivery of gold or currency, being shipped by railroad, and which was secured in the "express car". This job included guarding the safe or other strongboxes or coffers against outlaws, and memorizing the safe's combination to use at delivery.

== Origins ==
For decades stagecoach drivers and baggage-wagoners performed many of the tasks that would be later formalized under the title expressman. The first express companies, which developed in the early 19th century, contracted with stagecoach lines to carry their goods.

By 1900 there were four major express companies. As express services matured into an industry, the tasks of stage-coach driver were divided among specialties, such as driver, expressman, agent, clerk, and others, rendering them outmoded. Many of the stage-coach drivers transitioned into the express industry. Some became expressmen; some became agents, managers, and company owners.

With the expansion of the railroads, express companies shifted to use that faster form of transportation. On the railroads, the men who later were called expressmen were initially referred to as conductors, as they were responsible for managing all or part of the express rail car. The title expressman was adopted later, as the specialty became more recognized.

== Role of expressman in the United States ==
The express industry came about with the onset of the Industrial Revolution. It served a vital role in enabling companies to do business at regional and national levels. The expressman served not only as a courier, but as a highly ethical agent of currency, documents and other high-value items, and was considered a highly valuable employee.

=== Dangers ===
The inherent danger in their job led some to arm themselves. On major routes whole passenger cars were reserved for the expressmen, mainly for their security, as these agents would sit away from passengers as much as possible.

In one incident, an expressman in a reserved car was shot in the head three times and robbed by a man pretending to be another expressman. He survived, and later aided in the prosecution of his attacker. On some routes, serial robberies were a serious concern. The expressmen would sometimes be accompanied by armed men for additional security, and some enlisted the Pinkerton Agency, which became established in this era.

== Expressmen in Europe ==
The success of express shipping in the United States was quickly adopted by Great Britain and Europe. Harnden & Co. established the Liverpool to Paris line, thus bringing the role of expressman with it. Within a decade, express routes had been extended to most principal cities on the European continent.

== 20th century and decline ==
The expressman as an occupation in the United States continued until President Woodrow Wilson's government nationalized the railroads on December 26, 1917, after the United States entered World War I. The United States Railroad Administration introduced changes to support the war effort. It standardized rolling stock and steam locomotive designs. The railroads were returned to private owners in 1920, after the war.

Federal postal workers and eventually parcel workers took over the management of US mail and packages on trains. At times railroads have used special freight conductors, to ride with trains to ensure the care and security of special cargo.

== Representation in other media ==
Mark Twain featured expressmen in his short tale, "The Invalid's Story."
