= Louis McLane (expressman) =

American financier (1819–1905)

Louis McLane Jr.
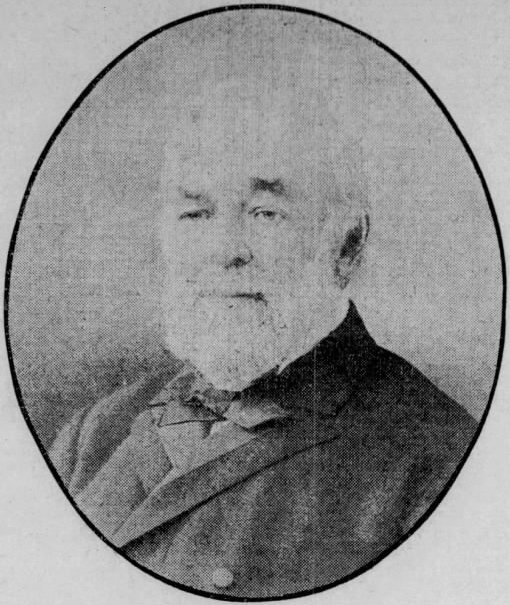
- McLane in a 1905 newspaper

President of Nevada Bank
- In office 1875–1881
- Preceded by: Inaugural holder
- Succeeded by: James Cair Flood

President of Wells Fargo & Company Express
- In office 1866–1869
- Preceded by: Danford N. Barney
- Succeeded by: Ashbel H. Barney

Personal details
- Born: January 20, 1819 Wilmington, Delaware, U.S.
- Died: December 13, 1905 (aged 86) Baltimore, Maryland, U.S.
- Resting place: Green Mount Cemetery
- Spouse: Sophie Latimer Hoffman (m. 1849)
- Relations: Robert Milligan McLane (brother); Kitty Garesche (niece); Robert McLane (nephew); Allan McLane (grandfather)
- Children: 8
- Parent(s): Catherine Milligan McLane; Louis McLane

Louis McLane Jr. (January 20, 1819 – December 13, 1905) was an American financier from a prominent Maryland family, who became a prosperous California forty-niner.

== Early life ==
McLane was born on January 20, 1819, in Wilmington, Delaware. He was one of thirteen children born to Catherine Mary "Kitty" (née Milligan) McLane and Louis McLane, who served as a U.S. Representative, U.S. Senator, Secretary of the Treasury, Secretary of State in President Jackson's cabinet (until his resignation in 1834), and Minister to the United Kingdom. He later served as president of the Baltimore and Ohio Railroad. Among his siblings were Robert Milligan McLane (a U.S. Representative and Governor of Maryland who served as Ambassador to Mexico, France, and China), Lydia (née McLane) Johnston (wife of Confederate General Joseph E. Johnston), Allan McLane (president of the Pacific Mail Steamship Company), James Latimer McLane (president of the National Bank of Baltimore and father of Baltimore mayor Robert McLane), and Juliette (née McLane) Garesché (wife of Peter Bauduy Garesché).

His paternal grandfather was Col. Allan McLane of the Continental Army.

== Career ==
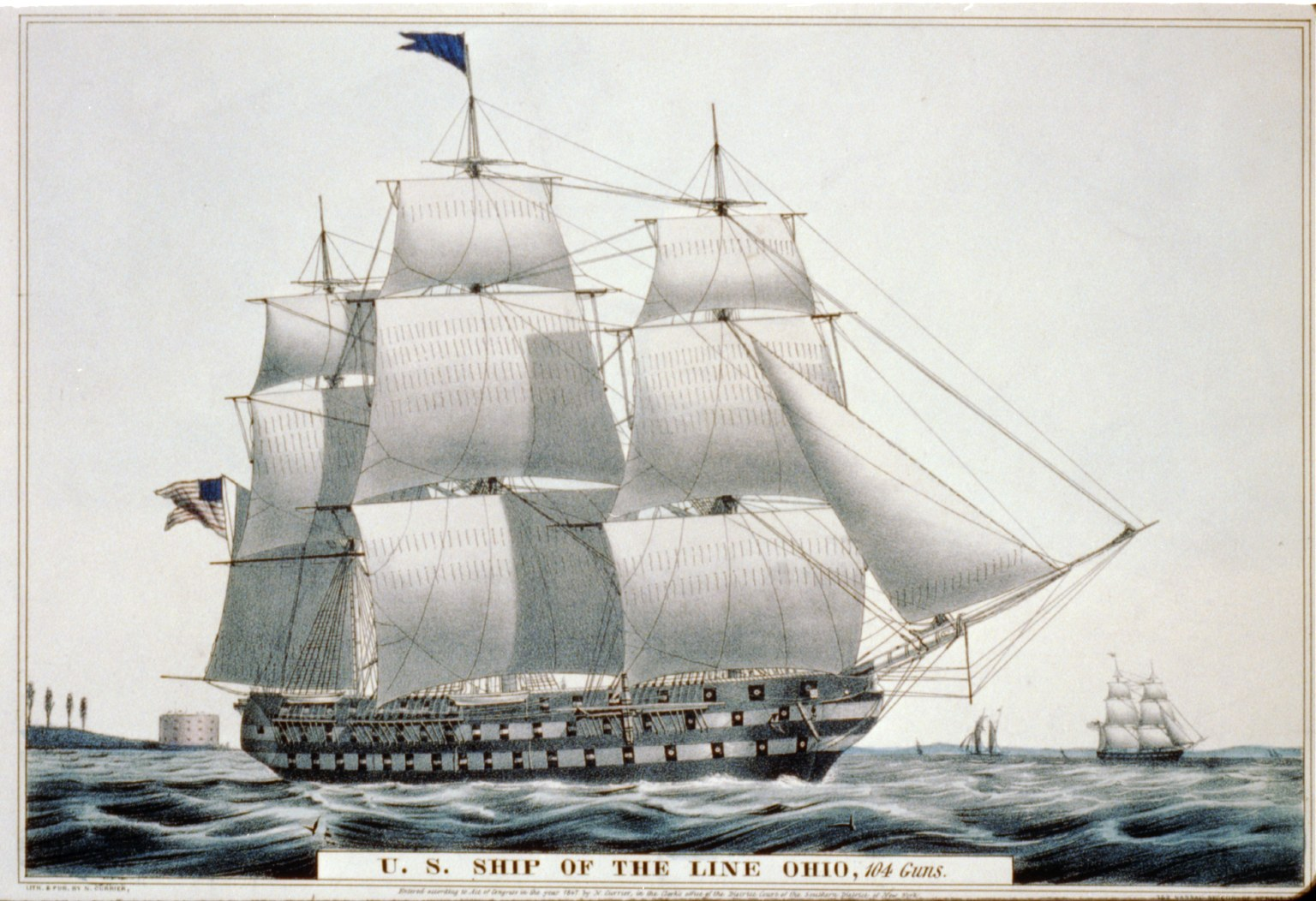
Currier and Ives engraving of the USS Ohio, where McLean served aboard from 1838 to 1840

In 1835, at just sixteen years old, he left his classes at Newark College when he was appointed a midshipman in the U.S. Navy, serving aboard the USS Ohio from 1838 to 1840. McLean submitted his resignation of his commission as a Lieutenant on January 20, 1850, to the Secretary of the Navy. Secretary William Ballard Preston accepted his resignation on January 21, 1850.

=== Business career ===
Shortly after his marriage and resignation from the Navy, McLane left for San Francisco and a career as a financier which was to take him away from his family many times during the next thirty years. He was a founder of the Safe Deposit & Trust Co. in 1864 and, during the 1850s, was Wells Fargo's first general manager in San Francisco. On November 1, 1866, he succeeded Danford N. Barney to become president of the Wells Fargo & Company Express, which he reorganized after its takeover of Holladay Overland. He was replaced by Ashbel H. Barney in 1869. McLane also served as the first president of Nevada Bank in 1875, which had been started by William S. O'Brien and James Clair Flood, who succeeded McLane as president in 1881. He returned to Baltimore in 1892.

In his later years, he served as chairman of the executive committee of the Mercantile Trust Company of Baltimore and a director of many financial institutions.

== Personal life ==
On June 12, 1849, McLane was married to Sophie Latimer Hoffman (1827–1907), daughter of Samuel Hoffman, a well known Baltimore merchant, and the former Elizabeth Rebecca Becker Curzon. Together, they were the parents of eight children, including:

- Katherine Milligan McLane (1850–1927), who did not marry and lived with her sisters Sophie and Elizabeth.
- Sophie Hoffman McLane (b. 1852), who died unmarried.
- Elizabeth Curzon McLane (b. 1856), who died unmarried.
- Louis McLane III (b. 1857), who moved to California around 1880 and also worked for the Wells Fargo Co.; he married Lizzie Evaline Blanchard of New York in 1887.
- Samuel Hoffman McLane (1861–1890), who went to school in Croydon, England.
- Emily McLane (b. 1864), who married E. Gittings Merryman of Cockeysville, Maryland.
- Sally Jones Milligan McLane (1867–1963), who married lawyer David Kirkpatrick Este Fisher (his sister Louise married U.S. Senator William Cabell Bruce).
- Charles Eugene McLane (1871–1941), who served as assistant secretary and treasurer of the Mercantile Trust and Deposit Company; he also served as president of the Maryland Jockey Club.

McLane suffered a stroke of paralysis in October 1901, but he survived. After several years of ill health, he died on December 13, 1905, at 1101 North Charles Street, his residence in Baltimore, Maryland. He was buried at Green Mount Cemetery in Baltimore.

Business positions
Preceded by Inaugural holder	President of Nevada Bank; 1875–1881	Succeeded by James Cair Flood
Preceded by Danford N. Barney	President of Wells Fargo & Company Express; 1866–1869	Succeeded by Ashbel H. Barney
