= John M. Clayton =

American judge (1796–1856)

John Clayton
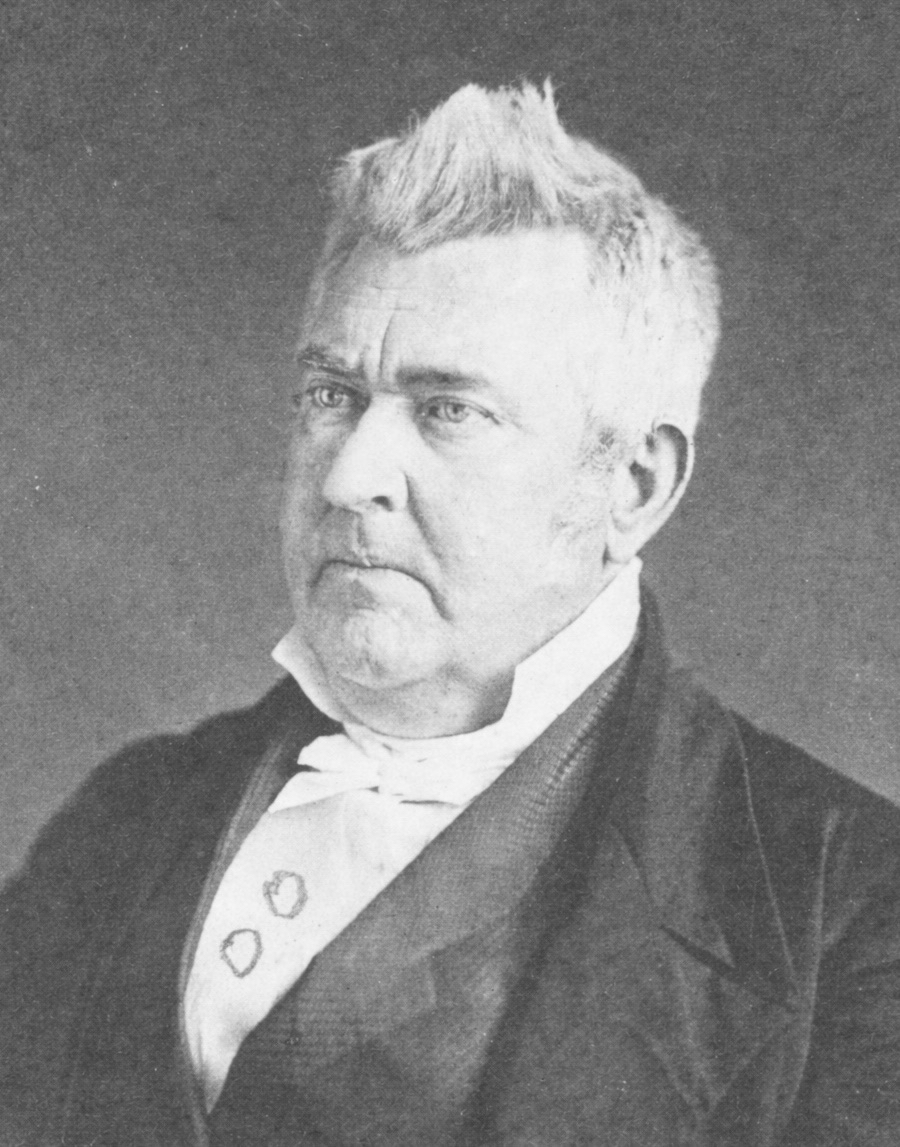
- Daguerreotype by Frederick De Bourg, c. 1849–1856

United States Senator from Delaware
- In office March 4, 1853 – November 9, 1856
- Preceded by: Presley Spruance
- Succeeded by: Joseph P. Comegys
- In office March 4, 1845 – February 23, 1849
- Preceded by: Richard H. Bayard
- Succeeded by: John Wales
- In office March 4, 1829 – December 29, 1836
- Preceded by: Henry M. Ridgely
- Succeeded by: Thomas Clayton

18th United States Secretary of State
- In office March 8, 1849 – July 22, 1850
- President: Zachary Taylor; Millard Fillmore
- Preceded by: James Buchanan
- Succeeded by: Daniel Webster

17th Delaware Secretary of State
- In office December 1826 – October 1828
- Preceded by: Henry H. Wells
- Succeeded by: Samuel Maxwell Harrington

Member of the Delaware House of Representatives
- In office 1824

Personal details
- Born: John Middleton Clayton; July 24, 1796 Dagsboro, Delaware, U.S.
- Died: November 9, 1856 (aged 60) Dover, Delaware, U.S.
- Party: Federalist Party (Before 1824); National Republican (Before 1834); Whig (1824–1854); American (1854–1856)
- Spouse: Sally Fisher
- Children: 2
- Education: Yale University (BA); Litchfield Law School
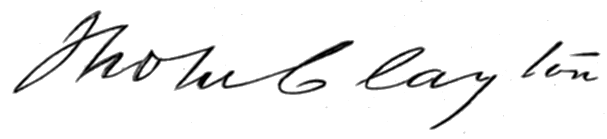
- Signature

John Middleton Clayton (July 24, 1796 – November 9, 1856) was an American lawyer and politician from Delaware. He was a member of the Whig Party who served in the Delaware General Assembly, and as U.S. Senator from Delaware and U.S. Secretary of State.

== Early life and family ==
Born in Dagsboro, Delaware, son of Sarah (née Middleton) and James Clayton. His uncle, Dr. Joshua Clayton, was a former Governor of Delaware and his cousin, Thomas Clayton, was a prominent lawyer, U.S. Senator, and jurist. John M. Clayton studied at Berlin, Maryland and Milford, Delaware when his parents moved there. His boyhood home, known as the Parson Thorne Mansion, was listed on the National Register of Historic Places in 1971. He graduated from Yale University in 1815, where he was a member of Brothers in Unity and then studied law at the Litchfield Law School. In 1819 he began the practice of law in Dover, Delaware.

About this time his father died and Clayton became the sole supporter of his immediate family, weekly walking the distance from Dover to Milford to see to their needs.

He married Sally Ann Fisher in 1822. She was the granddaughter of former Governor George Truitt. They had two sons, James and Charles, but she died two weeks after the birth of Charles. Clayton never remarried and raised the two boys himself.

In 1844, Clayton cultivated a tract of land near New Castle, Delaware which he called Buena Vista. It was listed on the National Register of Historic Places in 1971. Here he built a mansion and made one of the most fruitful estates in that region. Both of his sons died while in their 20s, shortly before the death of their father.

== Delaware politics ==
Clayton was elected to the Delaware House of Representatives for the 1824 session and was appointed the Delaware Secretary of State from December 1826 to October 1828. Conservative in background and outlook, Clayton quickly became a leader of the Adams faction which later developed into the Delaware Whig Party. During this time he was also the driving force in the convention that produced the Delaware Constitution of 1831.

== National politics ==
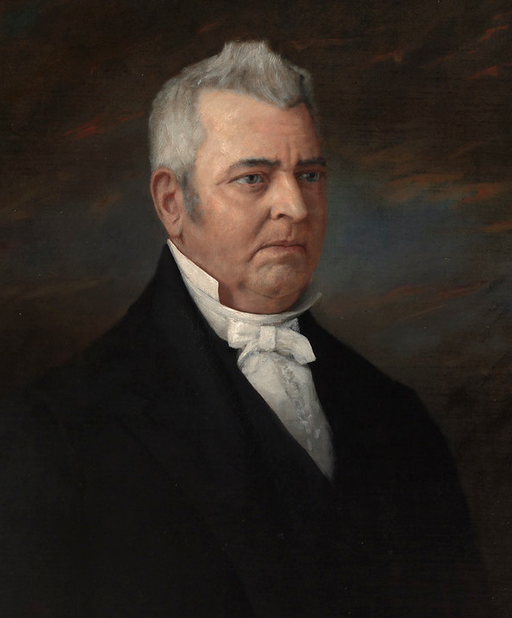
Portrait of John Clayton

In 1829, Clayton was elected to the United States Senate as its youngest member. Six years later he declined re-election, but the General Assembly elected him anyway, only to have him resign. He served from March 4, 1829, until December 29, 1836. He distinguished himself in the Senate by a speech during the debate on the Foote resolution, which, though merely relating to the survey of the public lands, introduced into the discussion the whole question of nullification. Clayton favored the extension of the charter for the Second Bank of the United States and his investigation of the Post Office Department led to its reorganization. At various times he served on the Military Affairs, Militia, District of Columbia, and Post Office Committees, but his most important position was the Chairmanship of the Judiciary Committee in the 23rd and 24th Congress.

After returning to Delaware from his first term in the United States Senate, Clayton was appointed Chief Justice of the Delaware Superior Court, replacing his cousin Thomas Clayton, who had been elected to the vacant U.S. Senate seat. He served in this position from January 16, 1837, until September 19, 1839, when he resigned to support the presidential candidacy of William Henry Harrison.

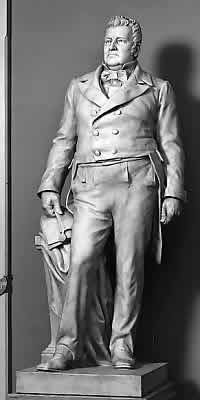
Clayton's statue in the National Statuary Hall Collection, sculpted by Bryant Baker.

Clayton was once again elected to the United States Senate in 1845, where he opposed the annexation of Texas and the Mexican–American War but advocated the active prosecution of the latter once it was begun. His tenure was only from March 4, 1845, until February 23, 1849, as he resigned to become U.S. Secretary of State.

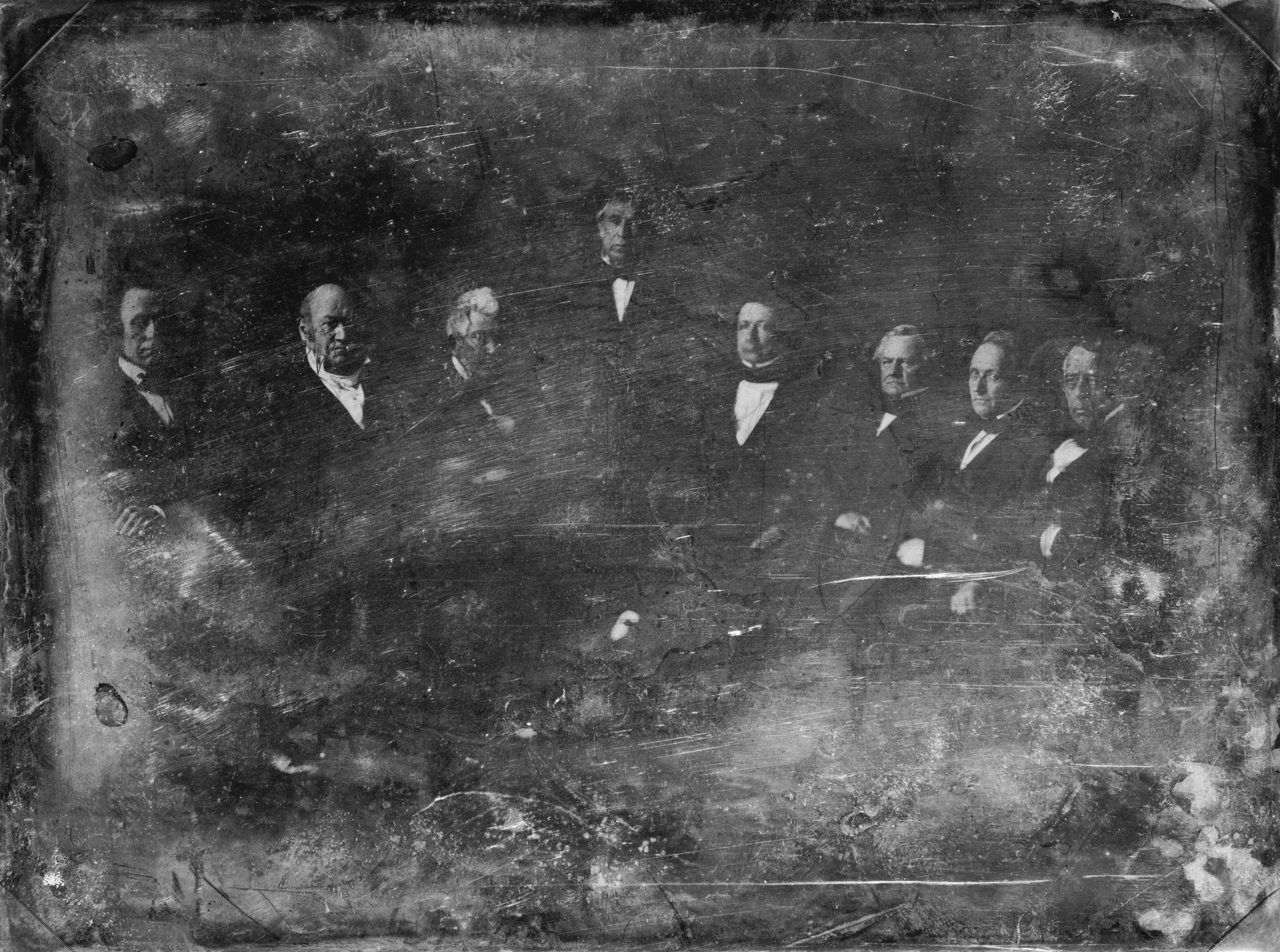
The Zachary Taylor Administration, 1849 Daguerreotype by Brady

On March 8, 1849, Clayton became U.S. Secretary of State in the Whig administration of Zachary Taylor. His most notable accomplishment was the negotiation of the Clayton–Bulwer Treaty of 1850 with the British minister, Sir Henry Bulwer-Lytton. This treaty guaranteed the neutrality and encouragement of lines of travel across the isthmus at Panama, and laid the groundwork for America's eventual building of the Panama Canal. His tenure was brief, however, ending on July 22, 1850, soon after President Taylor's death.

As secretary of state, Clayton was intensely nationalistic and an ardent advocate of commercial expansion but his strict interpretation of international law created crises with Spain, Portugal, and France.

Clayton was again elected to the United States Senate one last time in 1853 and served from March 4, 1853, until his death on November 9, 1856. He opposed the Kansas-Nebraska Act. One of his most noted speeches delivered in the Senate was that made June 15, 1854 against the message of U.S. President Franklin Pierce, vetoing the Bill for the Benefit of the Indigent Insane, which would have ceded public lands for an insane asylum.

== Death and legacy ==
After the death of his second son, Clayton moved his residence back to Dover. He died there and is buried in the Old Presbyterian Cemetery, which is at Dover, on the grounds of the Delaware State Museum.

His contemporaries considered Clayton one of the most skilled debaters and orators in the Senate. He was always accessible, and was noted for his genial disposition and brilliant conversational powers. Clayton Hall at the University of Delaware is named in his honor, as are towns in Delaware, New York, North Carolina and a county in Iowa. In 1934, the state of Delaware donated a statue of Clayton to the National Statuary Hall Collection.

== Almanac ==
Elections were held the first Tuesday of October. Members of the General Assembly took office on the first Tuesday of January. State Representatives had a one-year term. The Secretary of State was appointed by the Governor and took office on the third Tuesday of January for a five-year term. The General Assembly chose the U.S. Senators, who took office March 4, for a six-year term.

Public Offices
Office	Type	Location	Began office	Ended office	notes
State Representative	Legislature	Dover	January 4, 1824	January 3, 1825	
Secretary of State	Executive	Dover	December 1826	October 1828	
U.S. Senator	Legislature	Washington	March 4, 1829	December 29, 1836	
Superior Court	Judiciary	Dover	January 16, 1837	September 19, 1839	Chief Justice
U.S. Senator	Legislature	Washington	March 4, 1845	February 23, 1849	
U.S. Secretary of State	Executive	Washington	March 8, 1849	July 22, 1850	
U.S. Senator	Legislature	Washington	March 4, 1853	November 9, 1856	

Delaware General Assembly service
Dates	Congress	Chamber	Majority	Governor	Committees	Class/District
1824	48th	State Senate	Federalist	Samuel Paynter		Kent at-large

United States Congressional service
Dates	Congress	Chamber	Majority	President	Committees	Class/District
1829–1831	21st	U.S. Senate	National Republican	Andrew Jackson	Militia	class 2
1831–1833	22nd	U.S. Senate	National Republican	Andrew Jackson	Militia	class 2
1833–1835	23rd	U.S. Senate	National Republican	Andrew Jackson	Judiciary, Militia	class 2
1835–1837	24th	U.S. Senate	Whig	Andrew Jackson	Judiciary	class 2
1845–1847	29th	U.S. Senate	Whig	James K. Polk		class 1
1847–1849	30th	U.S. Senate	Whig	James K. Polk		class 1
1853–1855	33rd	U.S. Senate	Whig	Franklin Pierce		class 2
1855–1857	34th	U.S. Senate	American	Franklin Pierce		class 2

== See also ==
- List of members of the United States Congress who died in office (1790–1899)

== Images ==
- Architect of the Capitol; portrait courtesy of the National Portrait Gallery.

U.S. Senate
Preceded by Henry M. Ridgely	U.S. Senator (Class 2) from Delaware; 1829–1836; Served alongside: Louis McLane, Arnold Naudain, Richard H. Bayard	Succeeded by Thomas Clayton
Preceded by Richard H. Bayard	U.S. Senator (Class 1) from Delaware; 1845–1849; Served alongside: Thomas Clayton, Presley Spruance	Succeeded by John Wales
Preceded by Presley Spruance	U.S. Senator (Class 2) from Delaware; 1853–1856; Served alongside: James A. Bayard Jr.	Succeeded by Joseph P. Comegys
Preceded by William Wilkins	Chair of the Senate Judiciary Committee; 1833–1836	Succeeded by Felix Grundy
Political offices
Preceded by James Buchanan	United States Secretary of State; 1849–1850	Succeeded by Daniel Webster
