= Ashbel H. Barney =

American banker (1816–1886)

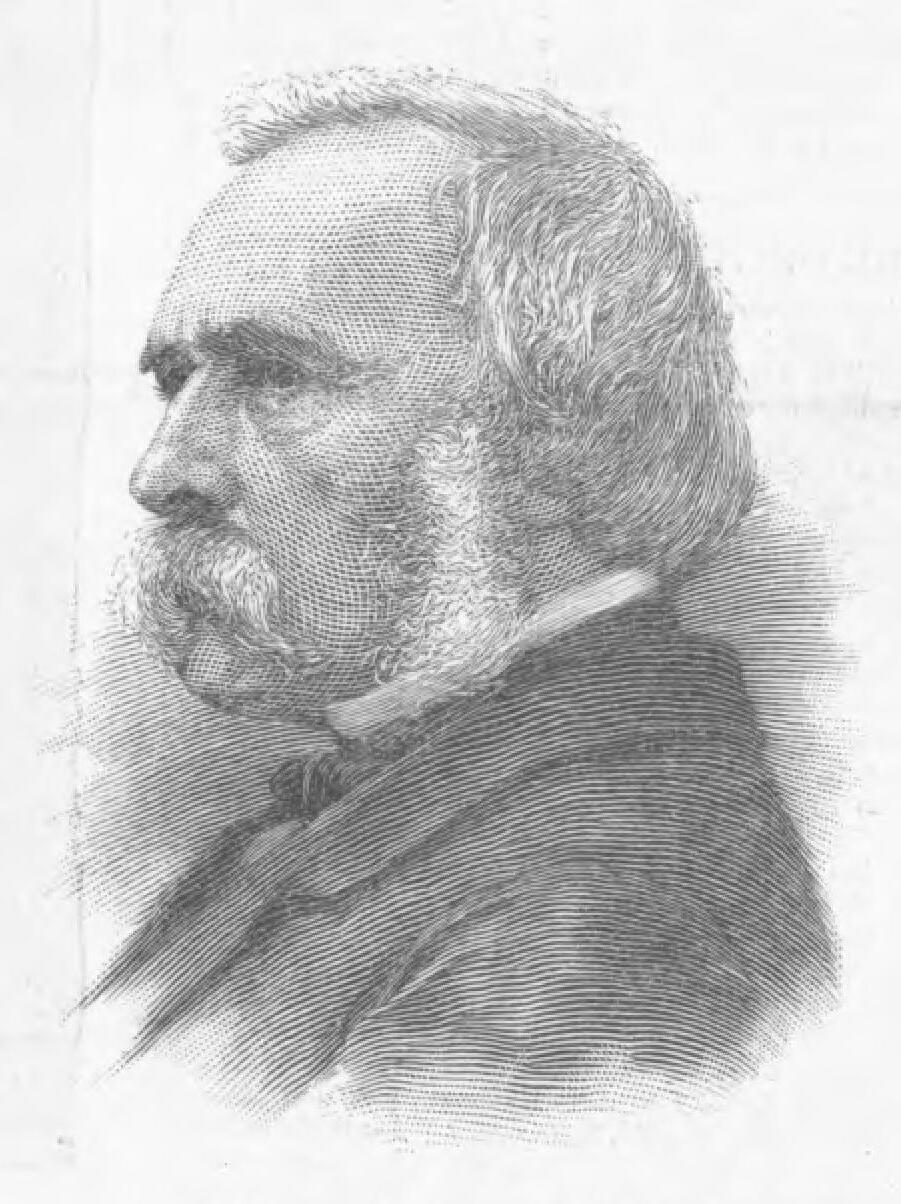

President of Wells Fargo & Company
- In office 1869–1870
- Preceded by: Louis McLane
- Succeeded by: William Fargo

Personal details
- Born: Ashbel Holmes Barney; September 2, 1816 Adams, New York
- Died: December 27, 1886 (aged 70) Manhattan, New York
- Spouse: Susan H. Tracy (m. 1846; died 1882)
- Relations: Danford N. Barney (brother)
- Children: 3, including Charles
- Education: Belleville Academy

Ashbel Holmes Barney (September 2, 1816 – December 27, 1886) was an American banker and expressman who served as president of Wells Fargo & Company in 1869–1870.

== Early life ==
Barney was born on September 2, 1816, at Adams, New York, in Jefferson County. He was the younger son of John Barney and Sarah (née Grow) Barney. His father was a farmer in Jefferson County, New York, when Ashbel and his older brother Danford were born. He was a descendant of Jacob Barney of Bradenham, Buckinghamshire, England, who settled in Salem, Massachusetts, in 1630.

He was educated at Belleville Academy in his native county before going to Cleveland, Ohio, in 1842 with his brother Danford, where they engaged in business as forwarding and commission merchants under the name Danford N. Barney & Company.

== Career ==
Barney remained in Cleveland when his brother Danford moved to Buffalo, New York, in 1849 and was elected to succeed Edwin Barber Morgan as president of Wells Fargo & Company in 1853, serving until 1866. Morgan had resigned the presidency upon his election to the U.S. House of Representatives. In 1857, Ashbel moved to New York City, where Danford had resided the previous year.

On November 17, 1859, Ashbel Barney was elected a director of Wells Fargo & Company in place of James McKay, who had resigned. Barney served as a director of the New York Elevated Railroad (founded by his brother and under the presidency of Cyrus West Field), and served as president, at various times, of Wells Fargo, the United States Express Company, and the Northern Pacific Railroad. He was vice president of Wells Fargo from the beginning of 1867 until 1869, when he succeeded Louis McLane as president. During his presidency, Lloyd Tevis acquired a controlling interest in Wells Fargo. Barney stepped down as president of Wells Fargo in 1870 and was succeeded by William G. Fargo that year and by Tevis in 1872.

=== Later life ===
After Frederick Billings was forced to resign the presidency of the Northern Pacific Railroad on June 9, 1881, Barney was chosen to briefly serve as interim caretaker of the railroad from June 19 to September 15, when Henry Villard was elected president by the stockholders and Barney was elected a director. After 1881, Barney practically retired from business. He retired from the board of directors of Wells Fargo & Company in 1883, with Colonel Charles Frederick Crocker elected in his place.

== Personal life ==
In 1846, while at Cleveland, Barney was married to Susan Hester Tracy (1818–1882), the daughter of Gardiner Tracy, an abolitionist and publisher of the Lansingburgh Gazette, and Catherine (née Lansing) Tracy of Utica, New York. Their children were:

- Gardiner Tracy Barney (1849–1856), who died in childhood.
- Charles Tracy Barney (1851–1907), who married Lucy Collins "Lily" Whitney, sister of William Collins Whitney, Secretary of the Navy.
- Helen Tracy Barney (1853–1897), who died unmarried in New York City.

Barney died at his residence, 101 East 38th Street, in New York City, on December 27, 1886. His funeral was held at his home and conducted by the Rev. Dr. Charles H. Parkhurst of the Madison Square Presbyterian Church. The pall bearers were Thomas Collier Platt, Grosvenor Lowrey, Samuel N. Hoyt, James C. Fargo (president of American Express), Hiram Barney, and George F. Crane. Also present were Barney's son and daughter with Morris K. Jesup, Theodore Wood, Salem Howe Wales, Darius Ogden Mills, Benjamin Brewster, Parker Handy, Dr. T. Gaillard Thomas, Peter F. Baker, Duncan Cryden, Charles Atterbury, Hugh Murdock, Louis Murdock, James H. Thompson, Charles H. Adams, George C. Magoun, Russell Sturgis (son-in-law of Danford N. Barney), Appleton Sturgis (son of Russell Sturgis), A. Bancroft, and W.P. Seymour. Interment was at Woodlawn Cemetery.

Business positions
Preceded by Louis McLane	President of Wells Fargo & Company Express; 1869–1870	Succeeded by William Fargo
