= Senator Bayard =

Senator Bayard may refer to:

- James A. Bayard (politician, born 1767) (1767–1815), U.S. Senator from Delaware
- James A. Bayard Jr. (1799–1880), U.S. Senator from Delaware
- Richard H. Bayard (1796–1868), U.S. Senator from Delaware
- Thomas F. Bayard (1828–1898), U.S. Senator from Delaware
- Thomas F. Bayard Jr. (1868–1942), U.S. Senator from Delaware in the 1920s
