= Statue of John M. Clayton =

John M. Clayton
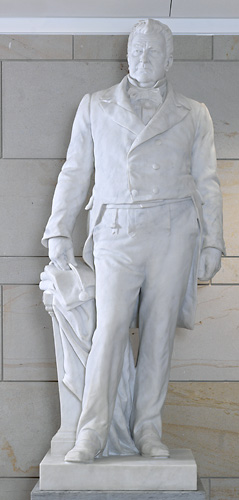
- The sculpture in the National Statuary Hall Collection
- Artist: Bryant Baker
- Medium: Marble sculpture
- Subject: John M. Clayton
- Location: Washington, D.C., United States

John M. Clayton is a 1934 marble sculpture depicting the American lawyer and politician of the same name by Bryant Baker, installed in the United States Capitol, in Washington D.C., as part of the National Statuary Hall Collection. It is one of two statues donated by the state of Delaware The statue was accepted in the collection by Robert G. Houston on June 6, 1934.

The statue is one of three that Baker has had placed in the Collection.

== See also ==
- 1934 in art
