= Martin Butterfield =

American politician

Member of the U.S. House of Representatives from New York's 25th district
- In office March 4, 1859 – March 3, 1861
- Preceded by: Edwin B. Morgan
- Succeeded by: Theodore M. Pomeroy

Personal details
- Born: December 8, 1790 Westmoreland, New Hampshire
- Died: August 6, 1866 (aged 75) Palmyra, New York
- Resting place: Palmyra Cemetery, Palmyra, New York
- Party: Republican (from 1854); Whig (before 1854)
- Occupation: Farmer; Businessman

Martin Butterfield (December 8, 1790 – August 6, 1866) was an American farmer and businessman from Palmyra, New York. He was most notable for his service as a United States representative from 1859 to 1861.

== Biography ==
Butterfield was born in Westmoreland, New Hampshire on December 8, 1790. He attended the local schools and became a farmer in Walpole, New Hampshire. He was active in the Cheshire County Agricultural Society, and served as its librarian and secretary.

In 1828, Butterfield moved to Palmyra, Wayne County, New York, where he engaged in the hardware business and operated a rope and cordage manufacturing enterprise. Butterfield continued to farm, was active in Palmyra's Union Agricultural Society, and served as its president.

Butterfield was active in the Episcopal Church and was a delegate to diocese conventions and other meetings. In 1843 he was one of several Palmyra residents who signed a public letter stating that they personally knew Joseph Smith, and that in their view he was not trustworthy and his claims of religious visions and revelations leading to publication of the Book of Mormon should not be believed.

In 1848, Butterfield was a presidential elector on the Whig ticket and cast his ballot for Zachary Taylor for president and Millard Fillmore for vice president. In 1858, Butterfield was elected to the United States House of Representatives as a Republican. He served in the 36th Congress, March 4, 1859 to March 3, 1861. During his Congressional term he served as chairman of the Committee on Agriculture.

Butterfield declined to be a candidate for renomination in 1860 and resumed his former business and agricultural pursuits. He died in Palmyra on August 6, 1866, and was buried at Palmyra Cemetery.

== Sources ==
- Transactions of the New-York State Agricultural Society, Volume 16

U.S. House of Representatives
Preceded by Edwin B. Morgan	Member of the U.S. House of Representatives from New York's 25th congressional district March 4, 1859 – March 3, 1861	Succeeded by Theodore M. Pomeroy
