= Danford N. Barney =

American banker (1808–1874)

President of Wells Fargo & Company
- In office 1853–1866
- Preceded by: Edwin Barber Morgan
- Succeeded by: Louis McLane

Personal details
- Born: Danford Newton Barney; March 4, 1808 Henderson, New York
- Died: March 8, 1874 (aged 66) Windsor Hotel, New York City
- Spouses: Cynthia Maria Cushman (m. 1833; died 1843) Azubah Latham (m. 1847)
- Relations: Ashbel H. Barney (brother); Charles T. Barney (nephew)
- Children: 6

Danford Newton Barney (March 4, 1808 – March 8, 1874) was an American expressman who served as president of Wells Fargo & Company from 1853 to 1866.

== Early life ==
Barney was born in 1808 at Henderson, New York, the son of John Barney (1775–1863) and Sarah (née Grow) Barney. His father was a farmer in Jefferson County, New York, when Danford and his younger brother Ashbel were born. (Note: Some writers have incorrectly rendered Barney's given name as "Danforth", but his brother Ashbel H. Barney spelled it "Danford" in a notice to Wells Fargo shareholders in 1869, and D.N. Barney himself signed the articles of incorporation of the New York Elevated Railroad in 1871 as "Danford N. Barney".)

He was a descendant of Jacob Barney of Bradenham, Buckinghamshire, England, who settled at Salem, Massachusetts, about 1630. Through his brother, he was uncle to Charles T. Barney, the president of the Knickerbocker Trust Company, the collapse of which shortly before Barney's death sparked the Panic of 1907.

== Career ==
As a young man, Barney went to Sacketts Harbor, New York, where he was cashier in a bank. In 1842, Barney and his brother, Ashbel, went to Cleveland, Ohio, and engaged in business as forwarding and commission merchants as Danford N. Barney & Company. Barney resided in Cleveland at 24 Public Square and later 169 Euclid Street.

In 1849, Barney moved to Buffalo, New York, where he was a commission merchant and proprietor of a bank. When Edwin Barber Morgan resigned as president of Wells Fargo & Company on November 26, 1853, Barney was elected to succeed him. He was also elected to the board of directors, of which he remained a member until 1870.

In 1856, he moved to New York City. Besides serving as president and a director of Wells Fargo, Barney was also a director of John Butterfield's Overland Mail Company, organized in 1857 to provide government mail coach service from Tipton, Missouri, to San Francisco, California, by way of El Paso, Texas, and Yuma, Arizona. On April 15, 1863, Danford Barney, Benjamin Pierce Cheney and William Fargo were appointed a committee in New York to go to California "in the best interests of the company". Traveling by stage, they spent most of July, all of August, and most of September 1863 in California looking after the company's affairs. Similarly, on February 8, 1865, Barney was asked to visit London "in reference to a financial agency of the California Railroad" (i.e., the Central Pacific Railroad, the western portion of the transcontinental railroad then under construction).

Barney was President of Wells Fargo until the company was merged into the Holladay Overland Mail and Express Company on November 1, 1866. The surviving company was thereupon renamed Wells Fargo & Company. Barney resigned as president of Wells Fargo to devote more time to his own business, the United States Express Company; and Louis McLane was elected president on November 1, 1866.

In 1870, Danford Barney retired from the board of directors of Wells Fargo. He was one of the incorporators of the New York Elevated Railroad in 1871, serving as president upon his death.

== Personal life ==
On October 8, 1833, he married Cynthia Maria Cushman, daughter of Peter Newcomb Cushman and Sally (née Kellogg) Cushman. Before Cynthia died on August 5, 1843, the couple were the parents of three children:

- Danford Newton Barney, Jr. (1835–1861), who married Sarah Elizabeth Brandegee and died at Irvington-on-Hudson, New York.
- Sarah Maria Barney (1836–1910), who married the architect and art critic Russell Sturgis, who was one of the founders of the Metropolitan Museum of Art in 1870.
- Newcomb Cushman Barney (1839–1916), who married Elizabeth Jackson Sturgis, sister of Thomas and Frank K. Sturgis.

On January 26, 1847, Barney remarried to Azubah Latham (1817–1875), the daughter of William Harris Latham and Azubah (née Jenks) Latham. Azubah was a sister of Charles F. Latham, later treasurer of Wells Fargo & Company, and a first cousin of Milton Latham, a U.S. Senator from California. Barney and his second wife were the parents of three more children:

- Arthur Latham Barney (1849–1922), who married Helen Louise Avery, a daughter of John Barber Avery.
- Mary Isabelle "Belle" Barney (1850–1925), who married Walter Smith Gurnee (1846–1918) of New York City.
- Lucy Latham Barney (d. 1940), who married John B. Mott (1842–1913) of Bellport on Long Island.

After the death of Azubah's father in 1868, she purchased the Latham family home in North Thetford, Vermont. After Azubah died in 1875, the house passed to her daughter Lucy, who owned it until her death in 1940.

Barney died at the Windsor Hotel in New York City on March 8, 1874. His widow died December 4, 1875. In her will she left $5,000 to start a library in Thetford named for her father.

=== Descendants ===
Through his eldest son Danford Jr., he was a grandfather of Danford Newton Barney III (1859–1936), a former Connecticut State Senator and treasurer of the Hartford Electric Light Company, and the great-grandfather of poet Danford Newton Barney IV (1892–1952).

Through his daughter Belle, he was a grandfather of Mary Latham Gurnee (1880–1968), who married (and widowed) three times: first to Francis L. V. Hoppin, a prominent architect and artist; second to Alfred Hudson Townley in 1949 (former Justice of the First Judicial Department in New York and widower of Martha Depew Strang, niece of U.S. Senator Chauncey Depew); and, after his death in 1954, Cyril Barthurst Judge, past president of the Newport Country Club, in 1963.

Business positions
Preceded by Edwin Barber Morgan	President of Wells Fargo & Company Express; 1853–1866	Succeeded by Louis McLane
