= Snowland (Leipsic, Delaware) =

Historic house in Delaware, United States

- U.S. National Register of Historic Places
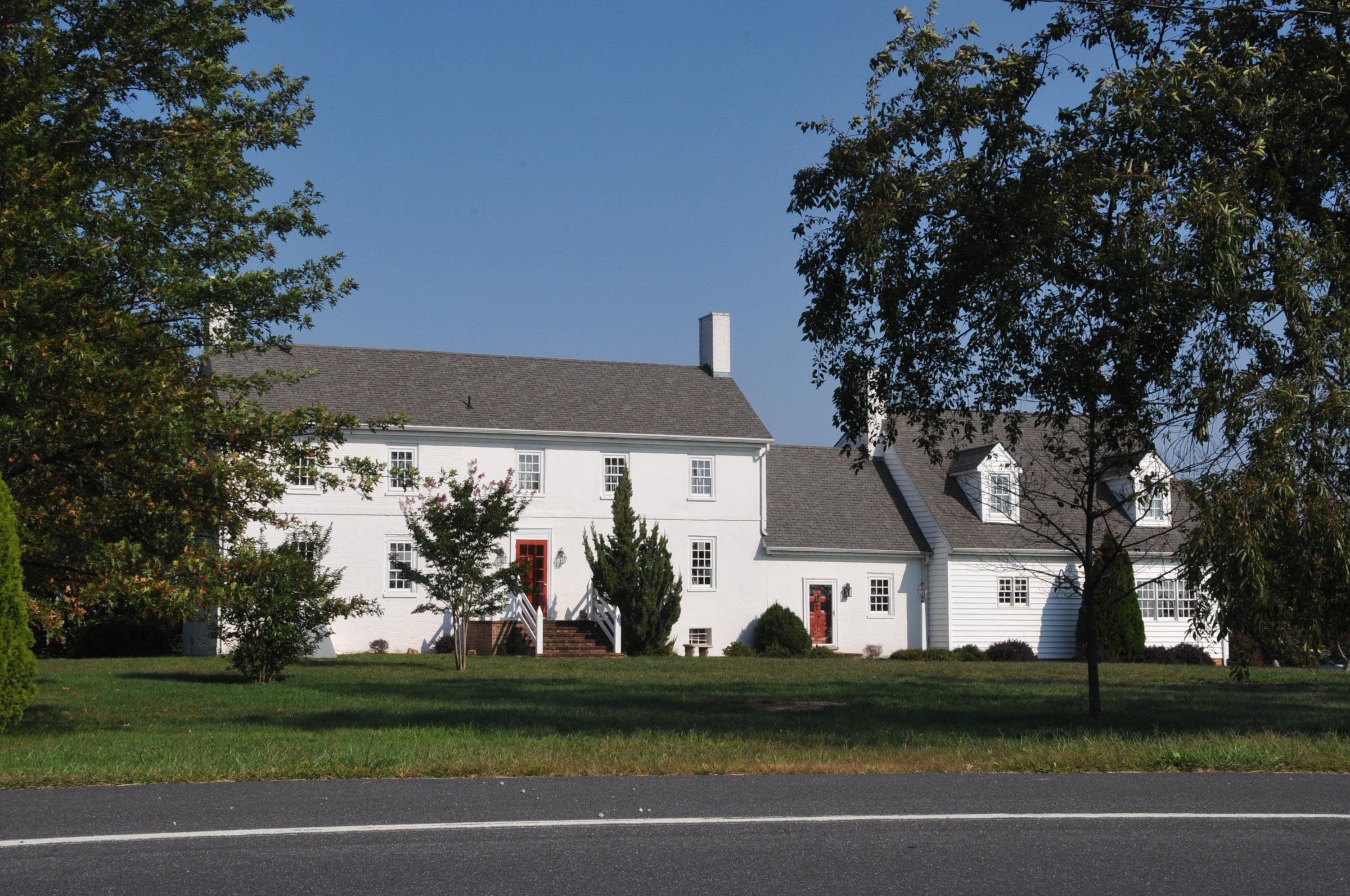
- Snowland, September 2012

- Location within Delaware Location within the United States
- Location: DE 42, Leipsic, Delaware
- Coordinates: 39°13′46″N 75°31′39″W
- Area: 1 acre (0.40 ha)
- Built: 1790
- Architectural style: Georgian
- NRHP reference No.: 73000497
- Added to NRHP: March 20, 1973

Snowland is a historic home located near Leipsic, Kent County, Delaware. It was built about 1790, and consists of a two-story, five-bay, brick main house with a lower wing that extends the main axis. It was originally built as a three-bay dwelling, but later expanded to five bays and a center-hall Georgian-style structure. It was the birthplace of U.S. Senator Arnold Naudain. (1790-1872)

It was listed on the National Register of Historic Places in 1973.

== Description ==
Snowland showcases a well-organized southwest frontage consisting of five bays, which, while not necessarily essential, adds to its overall appeal. The three bays to the right, including the center entry, comprise the original portion of the house and are stuccoed. Though the roof is devoid of dormers, the facade is graced by a simple box cornice and a belt course.

The rear of the building is rather more medieval in appearance. The northeast wall is again marked by a division line in the brickwork; but unlike the front, it is divided into four bays which are not regularly spaced.

To the southeast of the main house block, a lower wing extends the main axis. The visible brickwork on the wing and the main house is laid in a five-course common bond.

The house is now a center-hall Georgian structure, one room in depth and two stories high with an attic. The hall and the southeast room are simply detailed. Both contain crown molding and chair railing; the southeast room features a paneled end wall with a large fireplace opening. The northwest room added later, features punch and gouge detailing, including crown molding, chair railing, and fireplace mantel. The mantelpiece receives a full entablature, supported by fluted pilasters. The door and splayed window casings are paneled.

The second floor, simpler in detail, is similar in the disposal to the first-floor plan. The windows in the northwest bed chamber are also splayed. The southeast chamber, however, has been divided into two smaller rooms, and a bathroom has been added to the front of the second-floor hall.

== Significance ==
A tract of land located on Little Duck Creek called “Belle’s Endeavor” was owned by Christopher Southey in 1716. Thomas Green sold it in 1774 to William Barnes, who in turn sold it to Daniel Needham.

By 1790 Andrew Naudain had a house on this tract. The house was called “Snowland” for his wife, Rebecca Snow. The Naudains were a large family in Delaware and Maryland that descended from Elias Naudain, a shipmaster of La Tramblade. Because he was a Huguenot, Naudain fled France in 1682 with his wife and children. Elias Naudain died in England, but his widow and children settled in Delaware and Maryland.

At Snowland, Andrew Naudain fathered three sons: Arnold, Andrew, and Elias, all of whom were born within its premises. Arnold moved to Dover where he studied medicine with Dr. James Sykes. After a career as a major in the War of 1812, he became the Dover postmaster, a state and United States senator, and director of the Farmers Bank. Andrew Naudain also practiced medicine and was twice president of the Delaware Medical Society.

Elias Naudain stayed at Snowland, and, after his father's death in 1819, kept a store in front of the house and a granary nearby. By the year 1830, the property had gained the name "Naudain's Landing."
