= Louis McLane House =

Historic house in Delaware, United States

- U.S. National Register of Historic Places
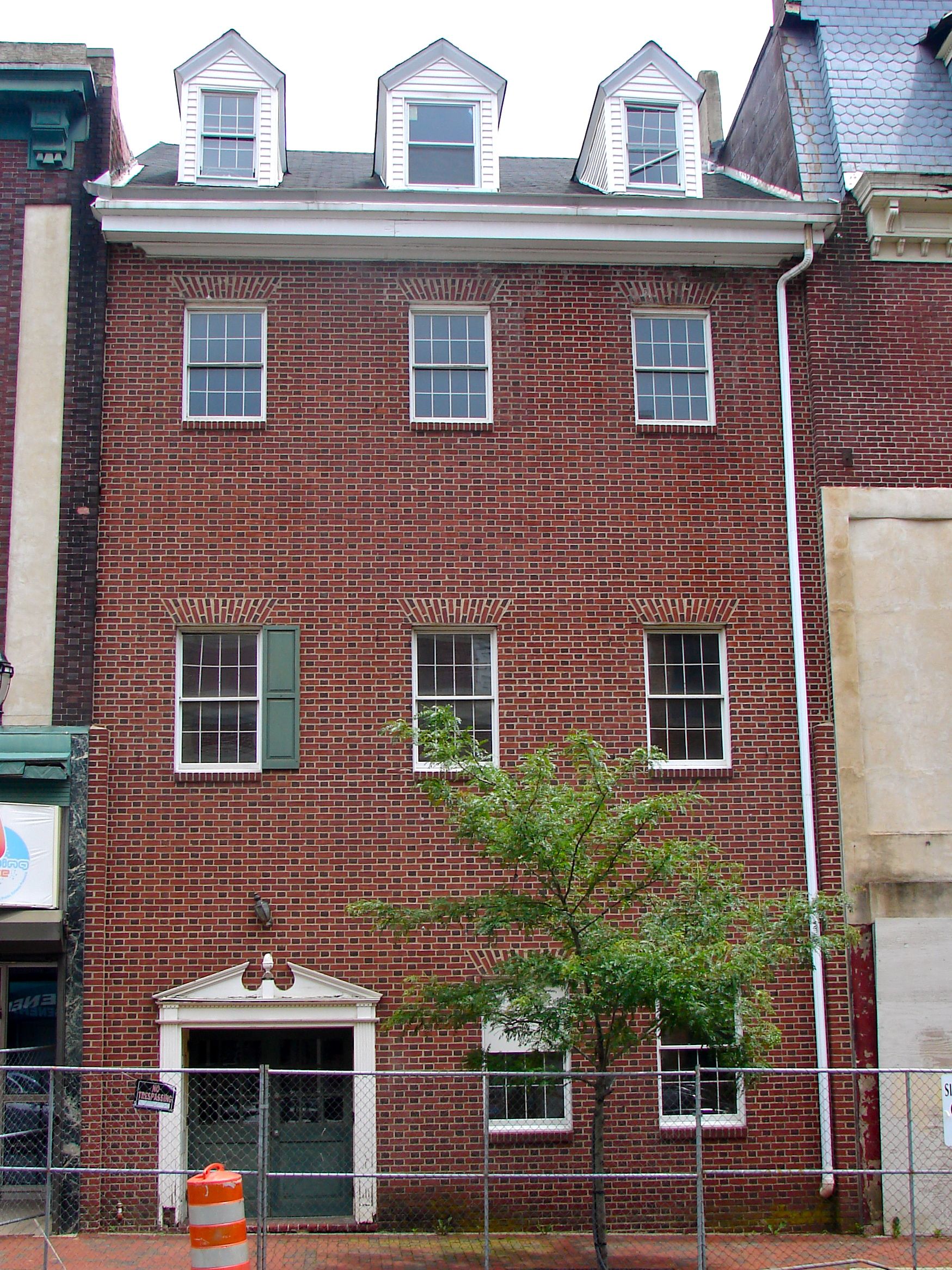
- Louis McLane House, June 2011

- Location within Delaware Location within the United States
- Location: 606 Market St., Wilmington, Delaware
- Coordinates: 39.742166°N 75.549836°W
- Area: 0.4 acres (0.16 ha)
- Built: c. 1792
- NRHP reference No.: 73000549
- Added to NRHP: April 24, 1973

Louis McLane House was a historic home located at Wilmington, New Castle County, Delaware. It was built before 1792, and is an example of an 18th-century urban residence. It is a 3 1/2-story, three-bay, brick dwelling with a gable roof later modified for commercial uses. It was the home of Congressman Louis McLane (1786–1857) and the birthplace of American politician, military officer, and diplomat Robert Milligan McLane (1815–1898) and Lydia Milligan Sims McLane (1822–1887), wife of Confederate General Joseph E. Johnston.

It was added to the National Register of Historic Places in 1973 and demolished in 2014.
