= Allan McLane =

Continental Army officer

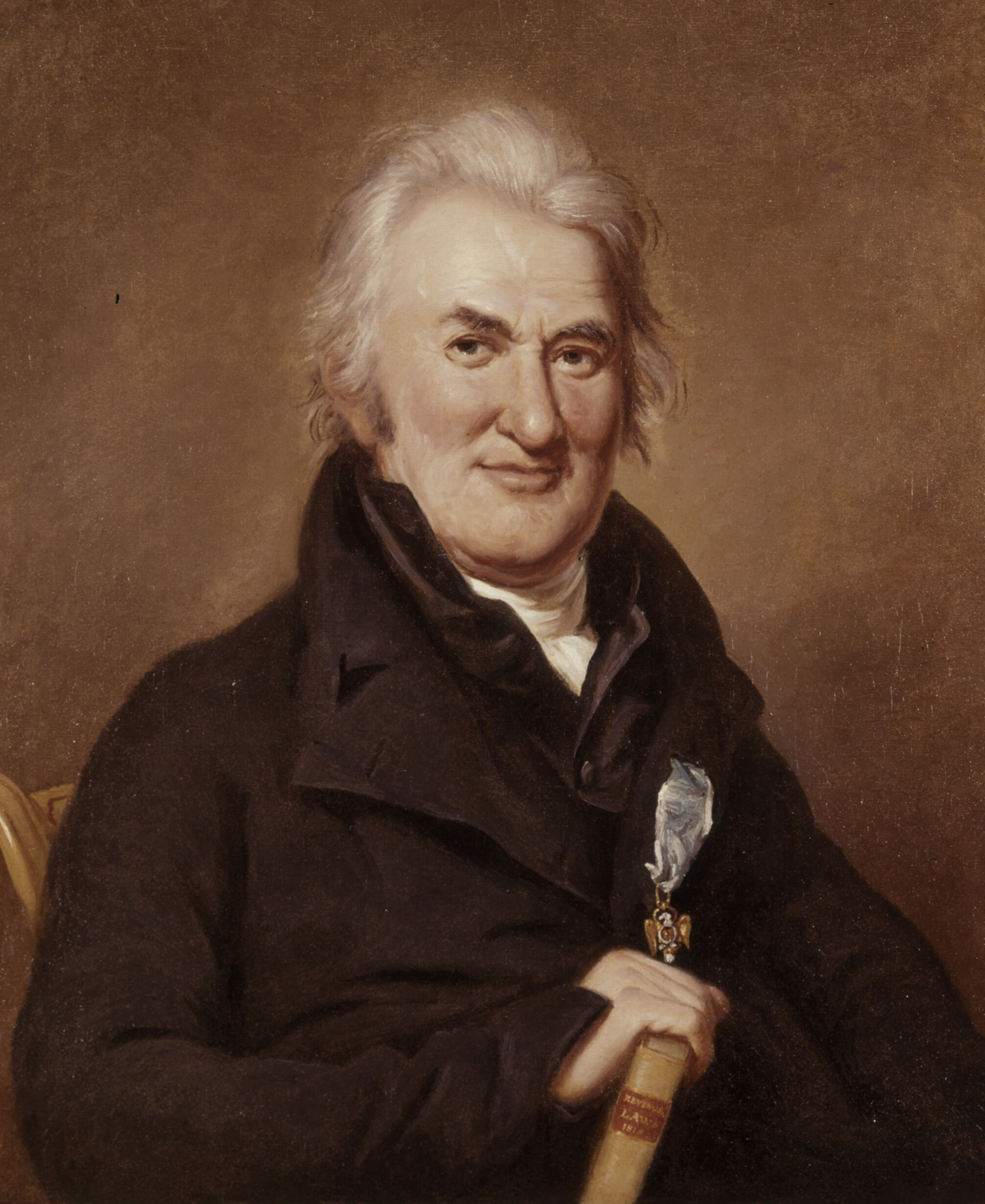
- Portrait by Charles Willson Peale, c. 1818
- Born: August 8, 1746; Philadelphia
- Died: May 22, 1829 (aged 82)
- Occupations: Soldier; judge; U.S. Customs collector
- Military career
- Allegiance: United States of America
- Branch: Continental Army
- Service years: 1775–1781
- Rank: Captain; Brevet major
- Conflicts: American Revolutionary War; Battle of Great Bridge; Battle of Long Island; Battle of White Plains; Battle of Princeton; Battle of Monmouth; Philadelphia campaign; Battle of Barren Hill; Battle of Stony Point; Battle of Paulus Hook; Yorktown campaign

Allan McLane (August 8, 1746 – May 22, 1829) was an officer in the Continental Army during the American Revolutionary War. He was appointed as the first United States Marshal of Delaware in 1789, and as Customs Collector of the Port of Wilmington in 1797.

== Early life ==
Allan McLane was born on August 8, 1746, in Philadelphia. His father, a Scottish-born merchant, had emigrated from the island of Coll to America in 1738.

McLane traveled to Europe as a young man from 1767 to 1769, touring the continent and visiting relatives in Scotland. Later, in 1774, he settled near Smyrna, Delaware, to begin a trading business.

In July 1775, he changed the spelling of his family name to McLane; it had previously been spelled McLean or Maclean. The change, he wrote, was made to avoid confusion with a "renegade Scot" of that name who was serving in the British military. (Note: Most likely Allan Maclean of Torloisk, who was at that time recruiting American loyalists in numbers sufficient to raise two infantry battalions (known as the Royal Highland Emigrants) for the defense of British Canada. He commanded one of those battalions in the Battle of Quebec in 1775, and was promoted to general in May 1776.)

== American Revolution ==
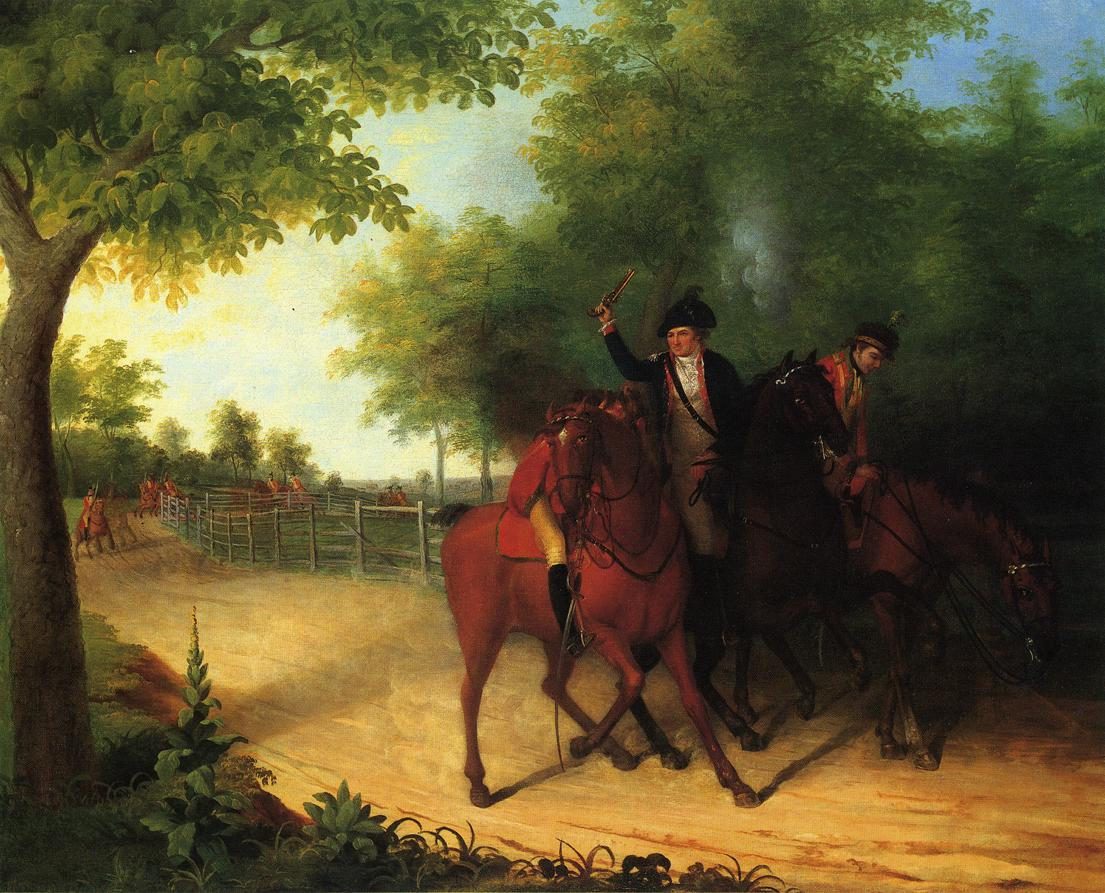
James Peale's painting of encounter between Allan McLane and British dragoons

McLane served in the Continental Army during the Revolutionary War. In 1775, he was a volunteer in the Battle of Great Bridge near Norfolk, Virginia, where the Virginia militia repelled a British assault. He was one of the first American officers to suspect Benedict Arnold's loyalty. He joined Caesar Rodney's Delaware regiment as a lieutenant, and fought at the battles of Long Island, White Plains, Princeton, and Monmouth.

He used most of the fortune he inherited after his father died to fund his own company, providing payment and equipment for the troops. During the Philadelphia campaign, according to historian Christopher Ward:

He was Captain of an independent corps, now a small group of horsemen, now a hundred men, mounted and on foot, including sometimes a contingent of Oneida Indians, he was at once forager, scout, and raider everywhere about Philadelphia and even, at times, in that city in disguise.

In December 1777, in personal combat with three British dragoons near Philadelphia, Captain McLane killed one, wounded another, and compelled the third to flee. The encounter became the subject of a painting by James Peale.

During the Continental Army's encampment at Valley Forge in 1778, McLane led foraging parties. He and his men cut off British expeditions and took their cattle.

In July 1779, McLane and his company were annexed to Lee's Legion, with McLane to command the infantry. McLane served under the command of Major "Light-Horse Harry" Lee at the Battles of Stony Point and Paulus Hook, but tensions between McLane and Lee ultimately caused Washington to send McLane and his company to Charleston, South Carolina, to reinforce General Benjamin Lincoln.

After the British captured Charleston in March 1780, McLane came under the command of Baron von Steuben, who was then assisting General Nathanael Greene in the Southern campaign. He returned north, and was breveted to the rank of major in 1781.

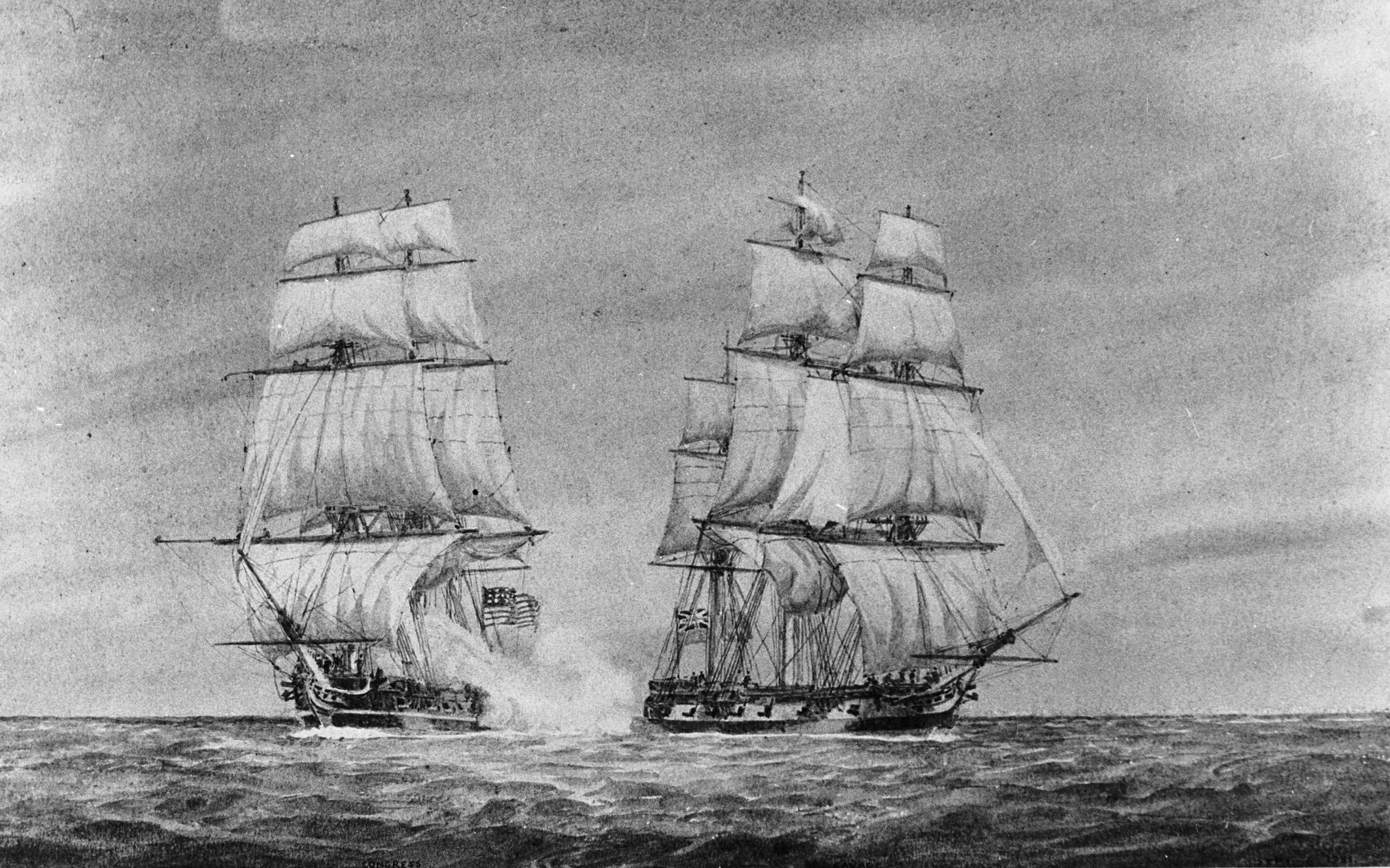
Painting of American privateer Congress capturing HMS Savage

In June 1781, McLane took ship on the American privateer Congress to carry dispatches from George Washington to Count Paul de Grasse, who was at Cap-François, Haiti, commanding a French fleet. After convincing de Grasse to bring his fleet to Chesapeake Bay, McLane returned to New Jersey in September 1781. Along the way, he commanded the Congress's Marines during the capture of HMS Savage, a British sloop-of-war.

McLane continued to serve through the Yorktown campaign, scouting the movement of British troops southward from New York City, and capturing British private naval signals. He left the army at the end of 1781.

== Post-war career ==
McLane was a delegate at Delaware's convention that ratified the United States Constitution in December 1787. He also served a member of the Privy Council, and as a Judge of the Delaware Court of Common Pleas.

He was appointed by George Washington as the first United States Marshal of Delaware on September 26, 1789, and served until his resignation in 1797. During this period, from October 1791 to January 1793, he also served as Speaker of the 16th Delaware General Assembly.

In 1797, Washington appointed McLane as Collector of Customs for the Port of Wilmington, a lucrative position that provided income from the seizure of contraband. As a well-known and a fervently loyal Federalist, McLane received the strong backing of James A. Bayard, who enabled him to keep the position despite the accession of Thomas Jefferson to the presidency in 1801.

McLane retained his appointment under presidents of both political parties, into the administration of Andrew Jackson, and served until his death on May 22, 1829, at the age of 83.

== Personal life and family ==
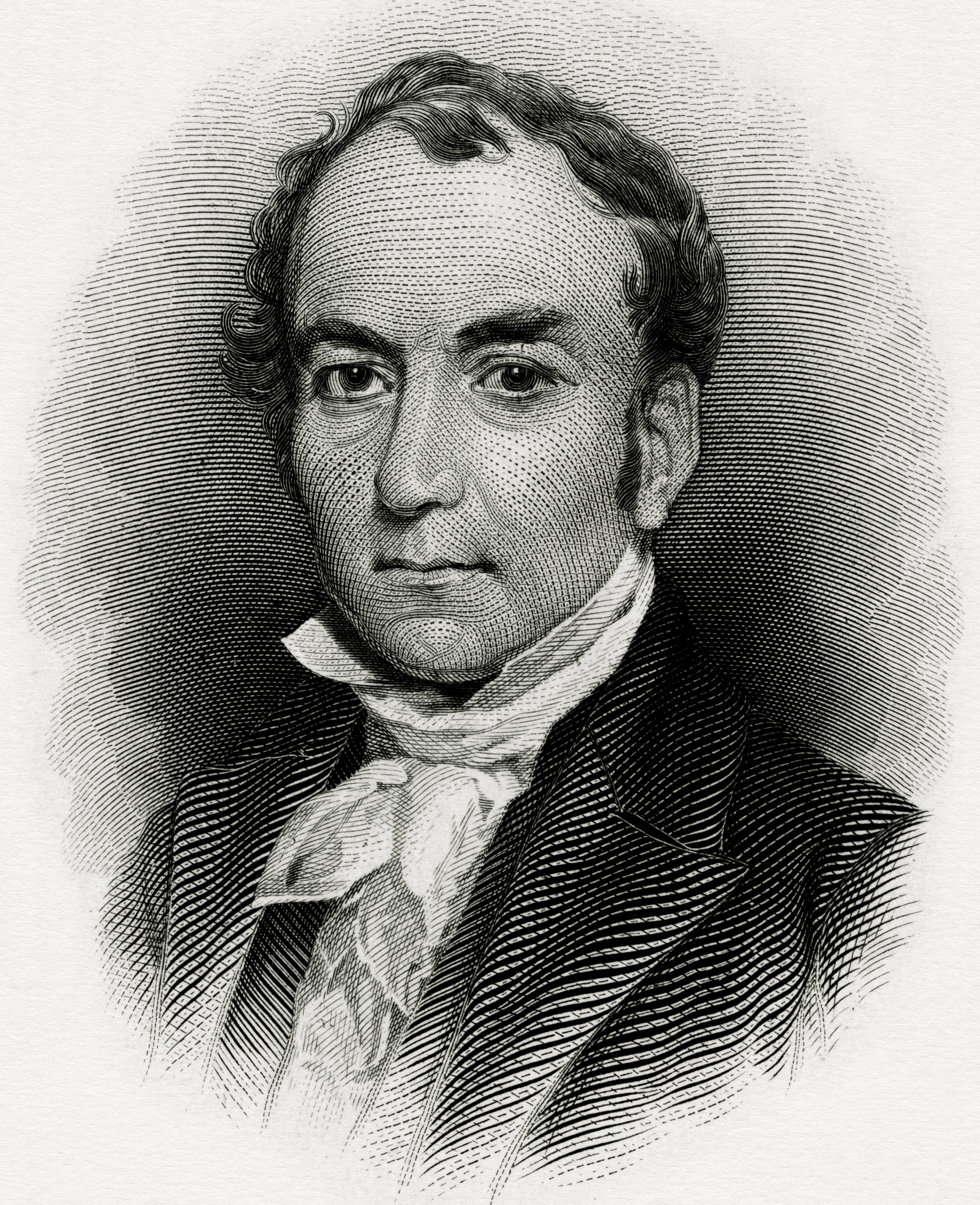
McLane's son Louis as Secretary of the Treasury

McLane lived in Smyrna, Delaware, after the Revolutionary War. He moved with his family to Wilmington after his appointment as Collector of Customs there in 1797.

He was a member of the Society of the Cincinnati, and a long-time advocate of the Methodist Church.

His son, Louis McLane, served as the Secretary of the Treasury and Secretary of State under President Andrew Jackson.

== Sources ==
- Cook, Fred J. (1959). What Manner of Men. William Morrow and Co. "Allan McLane, Chapter II, pp. 21–86"
