= Edwin B. Morgan =

American politician

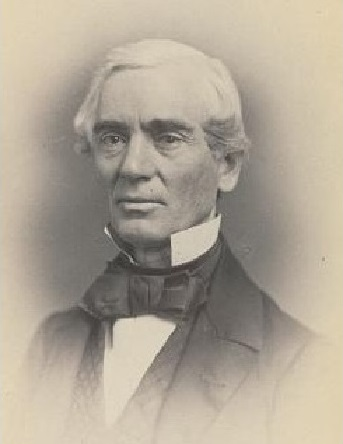

Member of U.S. House of Representatives from New York's 25th district
- In office March 4, 1853 – March 3, 1859
- Preceded by: Thomas Y. Howe, Jr.
- Succeeded by: Martin Butterfield

Personal details
- Born: Edwin Barber Morgan; May 2, 1806 Aurora, New York
- Died: October 13, 1881 (aged 75) Ledyard, New York
- Party: Whig (1852–54); Republican (1856)
- Spouse: Charlotte Fidelia Wood (m. 1829; died 1879)
- Children: 3

Edwin Barber Morgan (May 2, 1806 – October 13, 1881) was an entrepreneur and politician from the Finger Lakes region of western New York. He was the first president of Wells Fargo & Company, founder of the United States Express Company, and director of American Express Company. He was elected to the United States House of Representatives from New York and served for three terms, each term under a different party label.

== Early life and education ==
Morgan was born in Aurora, New York, the eldest son of Christopher and Nancy (Barber) Morgan. Educated at the Cayuga Lake Academy, Morgan became a clerk in his father's mercantile enterprise at 13, and at 21 he took over the business. Christopher Morgan was Edwin's brother, Lewis H. Morgan his cousin and Noyes Barber his uncle. He was a first cousin of Edwin Denison Morgan, governor of New York in 1859–1862.

== Marriage and family ==
On September 27, 1829, Morgan married Charlotte Fidelia Wood of Aurora. The couple were the parents of a son, Alonzo and two daughters, Louise F. and Katharine.

== Career ==
Morgan soon established a large enterprise in buying and shipping agricultural products, and also in boatbuilding, in which he was joined by his brothers. With his brothers, he also had extensive gypsum beds in Grand Rapids, Michigan, and a starch-making business at Oswego, New York.

In addition to his business career, Morgan was active in the New York Militia as inspector of the 2nd Division, which included units from Cayuga, Wayne, Ontario, Yates, Tompkins, and Seneca Counties. According to New York's 1827 militia law, each division was authorized an inspector at the rank of colonel, and each brigade an inspector at the rank of major; from this military service, Morgan derived the title "Colonel" Morgan, by which he was known even after he was no longer active in the militia.

He was a director and first president of Wells Fargo & Company, organized March 18, 1852, by his fellow townsman Henry Wells, who had been a founder of the American Express Company in 1850. Wells Fargo was developed specifically to offer express mail, shipping and banking services to California, where thousands of people were being drawn as the Gold Rush spurred migration and development. In 1854 Morgan founded the United States Express Company to provide similar express mail services for the Southern states. It connected with Wells Fargo at St. Louis, Missouri.

Also, from about this time until his death in 1881, Morgan was a director of American Express. By the time Morgan became involved, American Express had its headquarters in Manhattan.

Morgan was first nominated for a seat in Congress in 1850, but he was defeated by 14 votes. Morgan was elected to Congress in 1852 and 1854 as a Whig, and in 1856 as a Republican. He represented New York's 25th congressional district from March 4, 1853, until March 3, 1859. In 1855–1856 he was chairman of the Committee on Patents. Morgan was one of the members of Congress who rescued Charles Sumner from the assault by Preston Brooks on May 22, 1856.

Early in his Congressional service, Morgan resigned as president of Wells Fargo but remained a member of the board of directors. He was not a candidate for reelection in 1858. On July 20, 1858, he resigned his seat on the Wells Fargo board, and N.H. Stockwell was elected to succeed him. In November 1858, however, Thomas M. Janes resigned, and Morgan was again elected to the board.

== Later years ==
During the American Civil War, Morgan was active in raising and equipping regiments from New York.

In the postwar period, he became active with colleges. He was a trustee of Cornell University from 1865 until 1874. Working with his friend Henry Wells to found a college for women, he was a charter trustee of Wells College from 1868 until 1881, where he served as president of the board from 1878 onward. He was also a trustee of the Auburn Theological Seminary from 1870 to 1881. He supported the secondary school of Cayuga Lake Academy in Aurora as well.

Morgan was a director of Wells Fargo until the beginning of 1867. After a brief retirement, he was elected to the board in 1868 and served until 1870. An original shareholder of The New York Times, Morgan came to the paper's rescue in the midst of its fight against William Magear Tweed in 1871. George Jones, the editor, feared that ownership of the paper would pass into unfriendly hands. For $375,000, Morgan purchased enough stock to avert this, and contributed materially to Tweed's eventual downfall.

Morgan was physically and mentally quick-moving and incessantly active, even in old age. He died at Ledyard, New York on October 13, 1881, at the age of 75. Interment was at Oak Glen Cemetery in Aurora.

== Notes ==
U.S. House of Representatives
Preceded by Thomas Y. Howe, Jr.	Member of the U.S. House of Representatives from New York's 25th congressional district March 4, 1853 – March 3, 1859	Succeeded by Martin Butterfield
Business positions
Preceded by Inaugural holder	President of Wells Fargo & Company Express; 1852–1853	Succeeded by Danford N. Barney
