= Arnold Naudain =

American politician (1790–1872)

Arnold S. Naudain
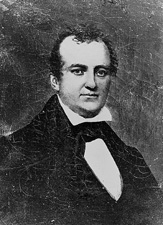

United States Senator from Delaware
- In office January 7, 1830 – June 16, 1836
- Preceded by: Louis McLane
- Succeeded by: Richard H. Bayard

Member of the Delaware House of Representatives
- In office January 4, 1817 – January 3, 1819; January 4, 1826 – January 3, 1827

Personal details
- Born: January 6, 1790 Dover, Delaware
- Died: January 4, 1872 (aged 81) Odessa, Delaware
- Party: National Republican; Whig
- Spouse: Mary Schee
- Education: College of New Jersey University of Pennsylvania
- Profession: Physician

Arnold Snow Naudain (January 6, 1790 – January 4, 1872) was an American physician and politician from Odessa in New Castle County, Delaware. He was a veteran of the War of 1812, and a member of the Whig Party, who served in the Delaware General Assembly and as U.S. Senator from Delaware.

== Early life and family ==
Naudain was born at Snowland or Naudain's Landing, near Leipsic, Kent County, Delaware. He graduated from the College of New Jersey, now Princeton University, in 1806. He then studied medicine at the University of Pennsylvania, graduated in 1810, and began practicing medicine in the Dover area. During the War of 1812 he served as surgeon general of the Delaware Militia.

His brother, Elias Naudain, was justice of the peace in Leipsic, in Little Creek Hundred during the 1820s. He served in the lower house of the Delaware General Assembly in 1827 and in that same year was commissioned first major of the Fourth Regiment of the Delaware Militia. In 1832 he was elected a delegate to the convention to revise the Delaware Constitution and was later elected to the Delaware Senate.

They were sons of Andrew Naudain and Rebecca Snow. Their father farmed and operated a store at Naudain's Landing. Rebecca Snow was from near Leipsic, Delaware, and her ancestors came to Delaware in 1635. She inherited the 300 acres (1.2 km^{2}) near Leipsic that became known as Snowland or Naudain's Landing, and she and Andrew lived there and are buried there.

Naudain's grandparents were Arnold Naudain and Catharine Allfree. The older Arnold owned a large amount of land, was a member of the legislature in 1763, and was said to have been "a man of very large stature." Naudain's great-grandparents were Elias Naudain and Lydia LeRoux. They married in Philadelphia in 1715. He was a mariner, in Delaware by 1717, and described himself as a resident of Appoquinimink Hundred and sometimes as of St. Georges Hundred. In 1735 he acquired farmland known as the "old Naudain homestead," which was located near Taylor's Bridge in Appoquinimink Hundred, and which, except for the period 1816–1827, remained in his descendants' hands into the 20th century.

Elias was the son of another Elias Naudain and Jahel Arnaud. They were both native to La Tremblade, Santonge, France and were naturalized in London in 1682. Jahel Arnaud came to America with her four children about 1686, probably within a year after the death of her first husband, and was one of the first colonists of Narragansett. She married Jacob Ratier there and moved to New York City when the Narragansett Colony disbanded in 1691. She is believed to have lived with her son, Elias, in Delaware after Jacob died in late 1702 and to have died there in 1720 or 1721.

Arnold Naudain, the subject of this article, married Mary M. Schee in 1810. She was the daughter of Hermanus Schee and Mary Naudain. According to Ruth Bennett in the Naudain Family of Delaware, Mary Schee Naudain is described as "an accomplished and religious woman, a devoted and loving wife and mother. She died in 1860.

Their eight children included James S. Naudain M.D. who married Ann Elizabeth Blackiston, both dying young, Andrew S. Naudain who studied law in the office of John M. Clayton but diverted his efforts to managing the Mt. Airy Plantation while his father served in the U.S. Senate and then went into the leather business in Philadelphia, Rebecca A. Naudain who married Hugh Alexander and lived in Chicago, and Mary H. Naudain who married William N. Hamilton M.D, who had attended school in Dublin, London and Jefferson College in Philadelphia. Practicing medicine first in New Castle, Delaware, in 1839 he moved his practice to Odessa. In the early 1850s he was resident physician at Fort Delaware, was a sergeant in the First Delaware Regiment and in the Fifth Delaware Cavalry. He was also Delaware state auditor and a Republican. Other children were Elizabeth R. Naudain who married James E. Ellis M.D. from West Chester, New York, and Catherine L. Naudain who married a prominent printer of Harrisburg, Adam B. Hamilton, and Lydia Frazier Naudain who married Clayton A. Cowgill M.D., a surgeon in the Civil War, who in 1867 moved to Florida, where he bought a plantation on the St. John River at Orange Mills. He served as Florida state comptroller after Lydia died.

== Professional and political career ==
Naudain established a practice at Cantwell's Bridge, now Odessa, before age 21 and gave medical service in the War of 1812 as surgeon of the Delaware Regiment. While carrying out his medical practice, Naudain was elected to the State House and served there in the 1817 and 1818 sessions and again in the 1826 session, when served with his brother, Elias Naudain from Kent County. Arnold was elected Speaker. He ran unsuccessfully for Congress in 1822, 1824 and 1828, losing each time to Louis McLean. In 1828 he was appointed Judge of the Court of Common Pleas. He lost again running for Governor of Delaware in 1832 against Democrat Caleb P. Bennett.

Filling the vacancy left by the resignation of Louis McLane, he was elected by the Delaware General Assembly on January 7, 1830, to the United States Senate and served from his election until he resigned on June 16, 1836. During the 24th Congress he was the Chairman of the Committee on Claims. Naudain was an anti-Jacksonian when first elected, and became associated with the Whigs as that party formed.

Naudain served as a member of the board of trustees at Newark College, later the University of Delaware, from 1833 to 1835. An active Presbyterian layman, Naudain proposed that the university decline the proceeds of a state lottery due to the opposition of his church. As a result, the state threatened to ask the college to return proceeds purchased from the college's endowment, since they had been financed by an earlier lottery. However the board of trustees voted 13–0 against rejecting the lottery proceeds. Naudain was one of seven trustees who refused to vote and subsequently resigned his position on the board.

Feeling his private business suffering, Naudain resigned from the U.S. Senate and resumed the practice of medicine in Wilmington. From 1841 until 1845 he was appointed to the position of Collector of the port and superintendent of Light Houses on the Delaware River. That year he moved to Philadelphia and continued his medical practice there, returning to Delaware in 1857. He was a Freemason, serving at one time as Grand Master of the Grand Lodge of Delaware.

== Death and legacy ==
Naudain died on January 4, 1872, two days shy of his 82nd birthday. He is buried in the Old Drawyer's Presbyterian Churchyard at Odessa, Delaware. He was described as "a most courteous gentleman, commanding in person, handsome in feature, and neat in attire; and evenly balanced in temperament; an humble, sincere Christian, a delightful companion, as winsome and interesting in old age as in the hey-day of youth." He has a street in Philadelphia named after him.

== Almanac ==
Elections were held the first Tuesday of October. Members of the General Assembly took office on the first Tuesday of January. State Representatives had a one-year term. The General Assembly chose the U.S. Senators, who took office March 4 for a six-year term. In this case he was initially completing the existing term, the vacancy caused by the resignation of Louis McLane. However, the General Assembly failed to fill the position for nearly a year.

Public offices
Office	Type	Location	Began office	Ended office	Notes
State Representative	Legislature	Dover	January 4, 1817	January 3, 1818	
State Representative	Legislature	Dover	January 4, 1818	January 3, 1819	
State Representative	Legislature	Dover	January 4, 1826	January 3, 1827	Speaker
U.S. Senator	Legislative	Washington	January 13, 1830	March 3, 1833	
U.S. Senator	Legislative	Washington	March 4, 1833	June 16, 1836	

Delaware General Assembly service
Dates	Assembly	Chamber	Majority	Governor	Committees	District
1817	41st	State House	Federalist	John Clark		New Castle at-large
1818	42nd	State House	Federalist	John Clark		New Castle at-large
1826	50th	State House	Federalist	Samuel Paynter		New Castle at-large

United States congressional service
Dates	Congress	Chamber	Majority	President	Committees	Class/District
1829–1831	21st	U.S. Senate	Jacksonian	Andrew Jackson		class 1
1831–1833	22nd	U.S. Senate	Jacksonian	Andrew Jackson		class 1
1833–1835	23rd	U.S. Senate	Jacksonian	Andrew Jackson		class 1
1835–1836	24th	U.S. Senate	Jacksonian	Andrew Jackson	Claims	class 1

Election results
Year	Office	Subject	Party	Votes	%	Opponent	Party	Votes	%
1832	Governor	Arnold Naudain	National Republican	4,166	50%	Caleb P. Bennett	Jacksonian	4,220	50%

Party political offices
First	National Republican nominee for Governor of Delaware; 1832	Succeeded by Cornelius P. Comegys
U.S. Senate
Preceded by Louis McLane	Senator from Delaware; 1830–1836	Succeeded by Richard H. Bayard
