= Richard H. Bayard =

American judge (1796-1868)

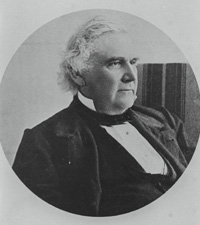

United States Senator from Delaware
- In office June 17, 1836 – September 19, 1839
- Preceded by: Arnold Naudain
- Succeeded by: Vacant (Note: The seat was vacant from September 19, 1839, until January 11, 1841.)
- In office January 12, 1841 – March 3, 1845
- Preceded by: Vacant
- Succeeded by: John M. Clayton

Chief Justice of Delaware
- In office September 19, 1839 – March 12, 1841
- Preceded by: John M. Clayton
- Succeeded by: James Booth Jr.

Personal details
- Born: Richard Henry Bayard; September 26, 1796 Wilmington, Delaware
- Died: March 4, 1868 (aged 71) Philadelphia, Pennsylvania
- Party: Whig
- Spouse: Mary Sophia Carroll (m. 1820; died 1868)
- Relations: Henry Bayard Rich (grandson)
- Children: 7
- Parent: James A. Bayard (father)
- Relatives: Richard Bassett (grandfather)
- Education: Princeton College
- Profession: Lawyer

Richard Henry Bayard (September 26, 1796 – March 4, 1868) was an American lawyer and politician from Wilmington, Delaware. He was a member of the Whig Party, who served as the first Mayor of Wilmington, Chief Justice of the Delaware Superior Court, and as U.S. Senator from Delaware.

== Early life ==
Bayard was born in Wilmington, Delaware, on September 26, 1796, the son of James A. Bayard Sr. and Nancy (née Bassett) Bayard. His father was a member of the Federalist Party, who served as U.S. Representative from Delaware and U.S. Senator from Delaware. His mother was the daughter of another U.S. Senator from Delaware, Richard Bassett. His younger brother, James A. Bayard Jr., was also a U.S. Senator from Delaware.

Bayard graduated from Princeton College in 1814, studied law, and was admitted to the bar in 1818. His practice was in Wilmington, where he became the first mayor of the newly incorporated city in 1832.

== Career ==
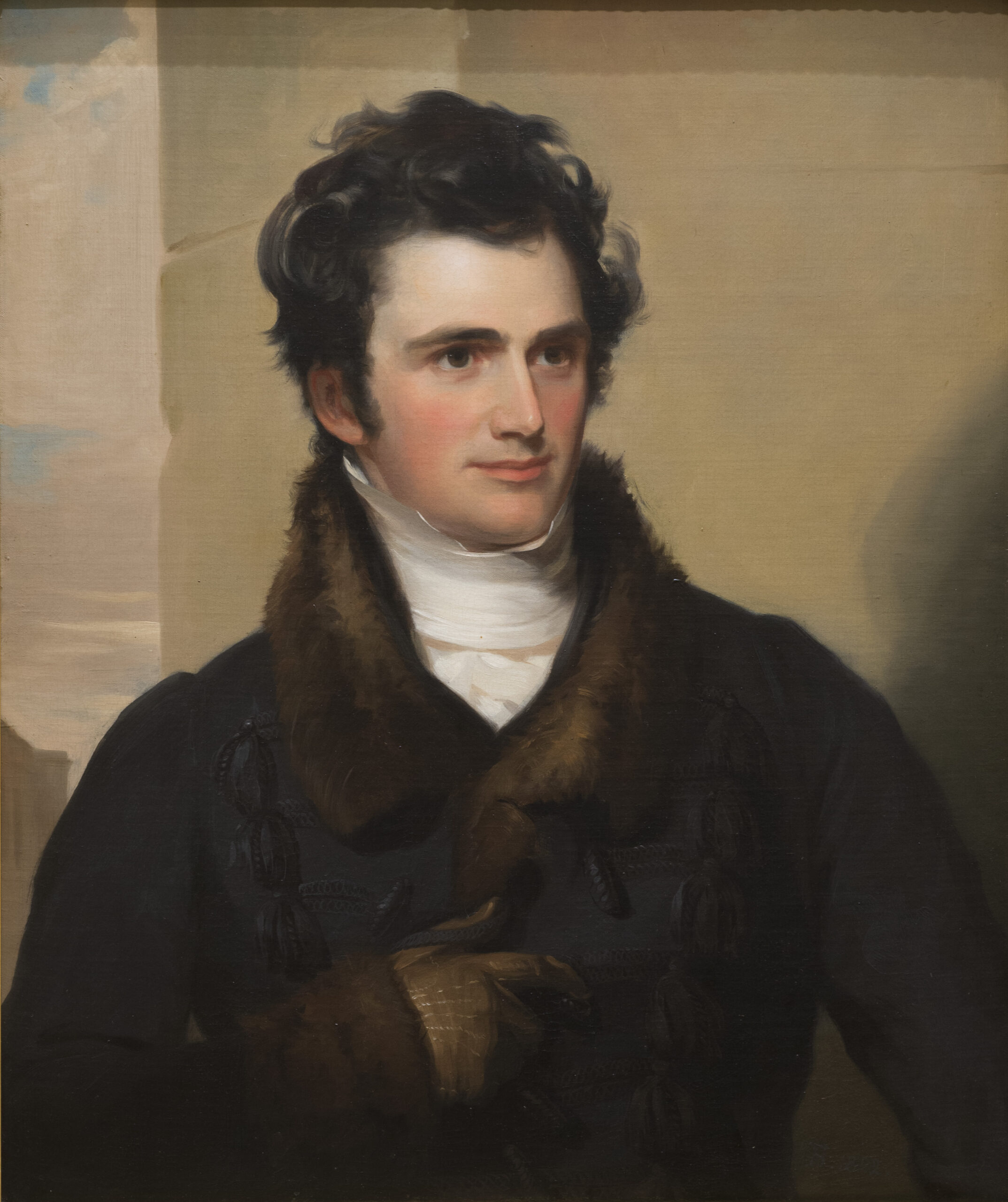
Portrait of Bayard by Thomas Sully in 1822

In 1836, Bayard was elected as an Anti-Jacksonian to the United States Senate, to fill the vacancy caused by the resignation of U.S. Senator Arnold Naudain. He served from June 17, 1836, to September 19, 1839, when he resigned to become Chief Justice of the Delaware Supreme Court. He served in that capacity for two years, from 1839 to 1841, when he resigned, being once again elected to the United States Senate, this time as a Whig.

The position had been vacant since his own resignation in 1839. This time, he served from January 12, 1841, until March 3, 1845. While in the United States Senate, he was chairman of the Committee on Private Land Claims in the 27th Congress, a member of the Committee on District of Columbia in the 27th Congress, and a member of the Committee on Naval Affairs in the 27th Congress and 28th Congress.

He did not seek reelection in 1844. He was appointed by President Millard Fillmore to serve as chargé d'affaires to Belgium from 1850 to 1853.

== Personal life ==
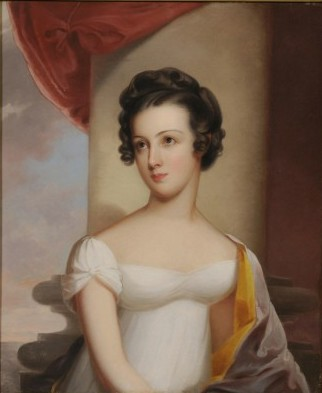
Portrait of his wife, Mary Sophia Carroll Bayard, by Thomas Sully, 1822

In 1820, Bayard was married to Mary Sophia Carroll (1804–1886) by the Rt. Rev. Henry Conwell, the Roman Catholic Bishop of Philadelphia. She was the daughter of Charles Carroll of Homewood, the only surviving son of U.S. Senator Charles Carroll, a signer of the United States Declaration of Independence, and Harriett (née Chew) Carroll, daughter of Judge Benjamin Chew. Together, they were the parents of seven children, including:

- Mary Louisa Bayard (1822–1889), who married William Henry Beck. After his death in 1859, she married Col. Manlio Bettarini, adjutant of King Victor Emmanuel II of Italy.
- Caroline Bayard (1824–1895), who married Henry Baring Powel, a son of John Hare Powel and Julia (née Deveaux) Powel, a daughter of Andrew Deveaux
- Elizabeth Bayard (1826–1885), who married Col. Frederick Henry Rich of the English Army, in 1848
- Charles Carroll Bayard (1828–1850), a Midshipman in the United States Navy who died from a wound received on Mount Vesuvius during the eruption in February 1850
- Richard Bassett Bayard (1831–1878), who married Ellen Howard, a daughter of Gen. Benjamin Chew Howard, a son of Gen. John Eager Howard, and Jane Grant (née Gilmor) Howard, a daughter of merchant William Daniel Gilmor and niece of art collector Robert Gilmor Jr., in 1860.
- Sarah A. Bayard (1835–1880), who died unmarried
- Harriet Bayard (1836–1865), who married Christian Børs of Norway

== Death ==
Bayard died on March 4, 1868 in Philadelphia, and is buried in the Wilmington and Brandywine Cemetery in Wilmington, Delaware. He was the second of five Bayards to serve in the United States Senate.

== Almanac ==
The General Assembly chose the U.S. Senators, who took office March 4 for a six-year term. In this case, he was initially completing the existing term, the vacancy caused by the resignation of Arnold Naudain. However, he resigned the position before the term ended only to accept appointment over a year later in a new term which he completed. Between his resignation and appointment, the position was vacant.

Public offices
Office	Type	Location	Began office	Ended office	Notes
U.S. Senator	Legislature	Washington	June 17, 1836	September 19, 1839	
U.S. Senator	Legislature	Washington	January 12, 1841	March 3, 1845	

United States congressional service
Dates	Congress	Chamber	Majority	President	Committees	Class/District
1836–1837	24th	U.S. Senate	Democratic	Andrew Jackson		class 1
1837–1839	25th	U.S. Senate	Democratic	Martin Van Buren		class 1
1839–1841	26th	U.S. Senate	Democratic	Martin Van Buren		class 1
1841–1843	27th	U.S. Senate	Whig	William Henry Harrison; John Tyler	Private Land Claims; District of Columbia	class 1
1843–1845	28th	U.S. Senate	Whig	John Tyler	Naval Affairs	class 1

== Places with more information ==
- Delaware Historical Society; website; 505 North Market Street, Wilmington, Delaware 19801; (302) 655-7161.
- University of Delaware; Library website; 181 South College Avenue, Newark, Delaware 19717; (302) 831–2965.

U.S. Senate
Preceded by Arnold Naudain	Senator from Delaware; 1836–1839	Vacant Title next held by Himself
Vacant Title last held by Himself	Senator from Delaware; 1841–1845	Succeeded by John M. Clayton
