= Mercantile Trust and Deposit Company =

Historic building in Maryland, USA

- U.S. National Register of Historic Places
- Baltimore City Landmark
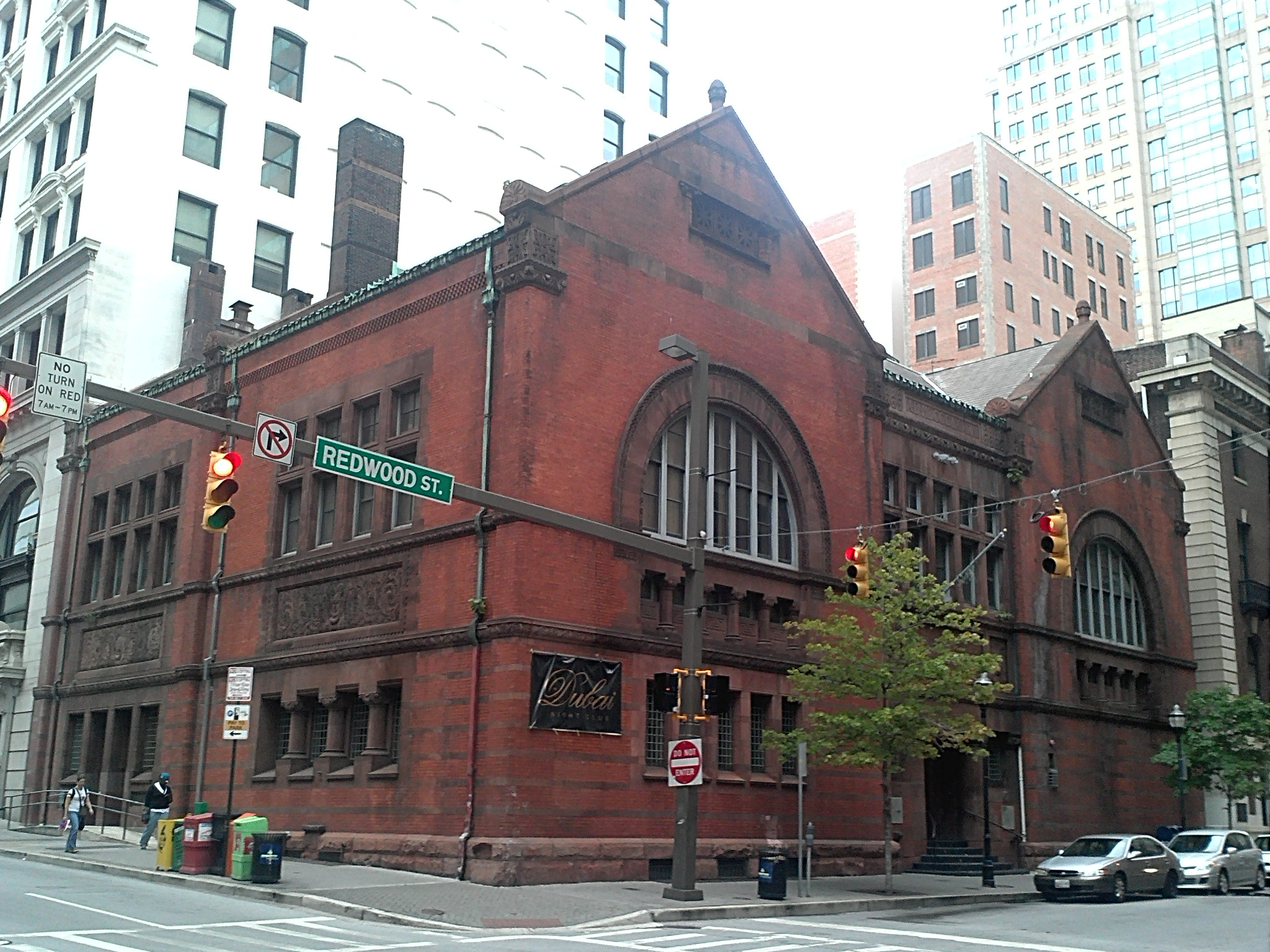
- Mercantile Trust and Deposit Company, September 2012
- Interactive map of Mercantile Trust and Deposit Company
- Location: 202 E. Redwood St., Baltimore, Maryland
- Coordinates: 39°17′21″N 76°36′45″W
- Area: less than one acre
- Built: 1885
- Architect: Wyatt & Sperry
- Architectural style: Romanesque
- NRHP reference No.: 83002935

Significant dates
- Added to NRHP: March 17, 1983
- Designated BCL: 1975

Mercantile Trust and Deposit Company is a historic bank building in Baltimore, designed by the Baltimore architectural firm of Wyatt and Sperry and constructed in 1885. It has a brick-with-stone-ornamentation Romanesque Revival structure, with deeply set windows, round-arch window openings, squat columns with foliated capitals, steeply pitched broad plane roofs, and straight-topped window groups. The interior features a large banking room with a balcony, Corinthian columns and ornate wall plaster work.

The Safe Deposit Company on Redwood Street in Baltimore was one of the few buildings that survived the Great Baltimore Fire of 1904. It was "created as a repository of Southern wealth in 1864" This date was not only "one year before the start of the Civil War but one year after the National Bank Act of 1863". Coincidentally, the March 10, 1864 grant of the state charter for the Safe Deposit was on the same day that newspapers reported General Sherman's arrival in Vicksburg, MS at the end of the Vicksburg Campaign.

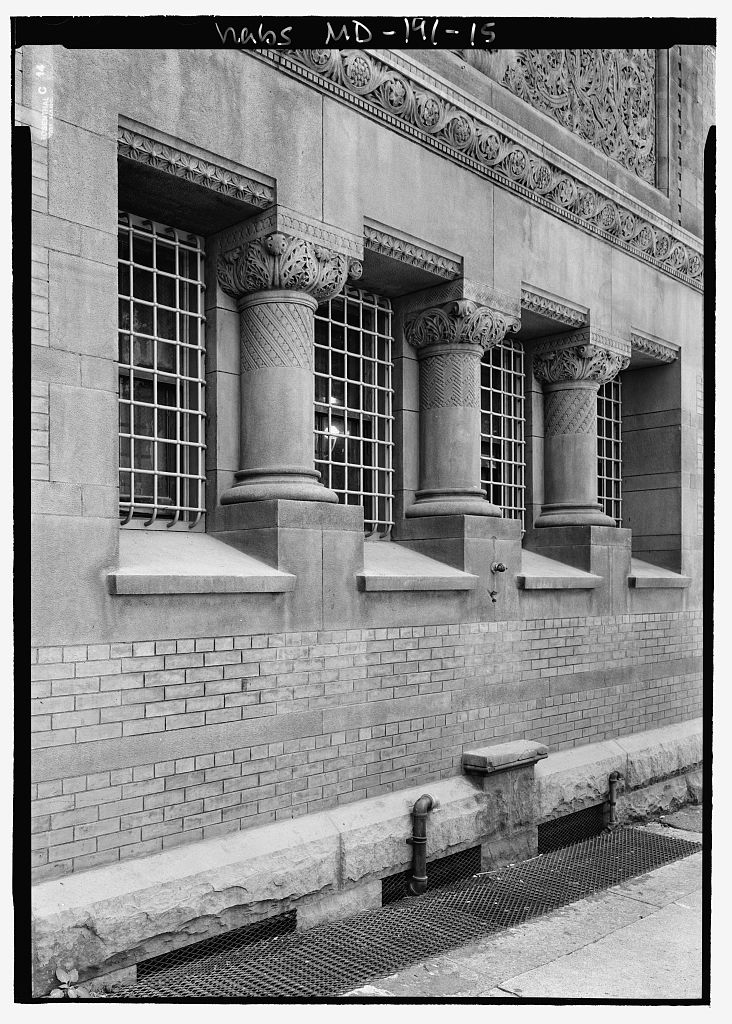

The Safe Deposit Building was finished in 1886, was "red brick with light red firestone trim". Around the turn of the century, the Safe Deposit Company boasted about the security of their vaults. Safe Deposit touted its "Great Vault," whose three fireproof outer doors and two burglar-proof inner ones sat in walls of steel and iron, surrounded by a foot of concrete and 2 feet of brick, according to a company history. Along the street, there were "spy steps" which enabled roving late 19th century policemen to peer into the windows. These "spy steps" provided in the center of the south part of the west wall, and on each side of the doorway are about three feet from the ground. They are a protruding stone step, and at shoulder height is a bronze ring. This was intended to assist a policeman to look in the windows. The "brass ring at shoulder level was used to balance them on the step. The steps are still jutting out into the sidewalk on both the Calvert and Redwood street sides of the Safe Deposit building. However, metal rings are only on one of the Calvert "spy steps" and on the right-hand side of the Redwood Street main entrance.

The February 1904 fire that devastated downtown Baltimore left the Safe Deposit Building still standing. It did, however, sustain some damage when bricks from an adjacent building "fell through the skylight and set fire to the interior". The structural iron in the roof and basement helped to preserve the structure. The exterior and safe deposit boxes survived, but the interior had to be rebuilt.

Mercantile Trust and Deposit Company was listed on the National Register of Historic Places in 1983.

Previously the home of Club Dubai, the building was purchased by Modern Globe LLC for $1.25 million in May 2012 for use by the Chesapeake Shakespeare Company. After improvements estimated to cost about $6 million, there are plans to open the Mercantile building as a new venue for the Chesapeake Shakespeare Company in 2014. Plans call for a thrust stage, surrounded on three sides by two mezzanine levels.
