= Wells Fargo (1852–1998) =

Former American banking company

Wells Fargo & Company
- Final logo used from 1986 to 1996

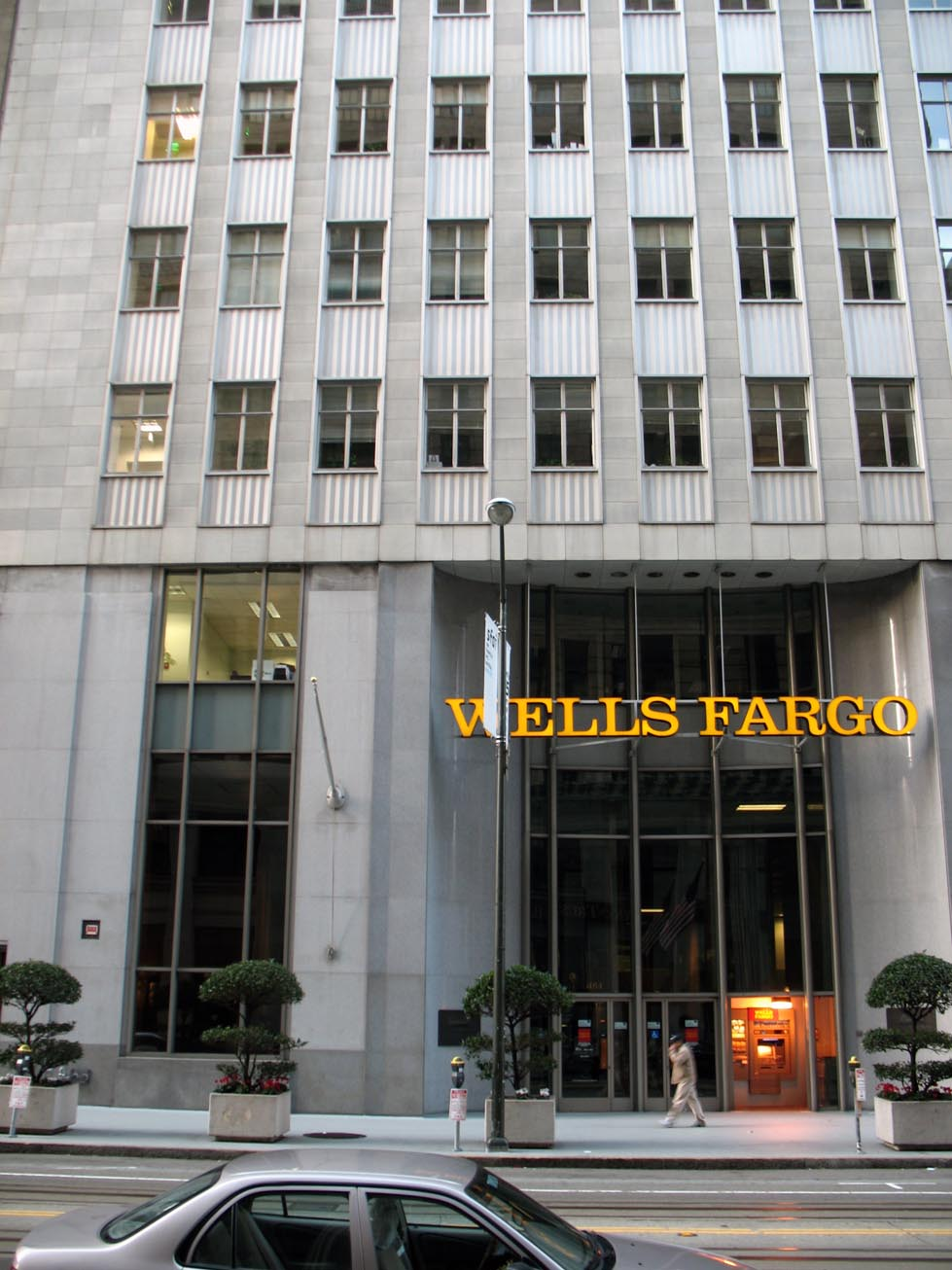
- The Wells Fargo headquarters complex in San Francisco, California, 2007
- Type: Public
- Traded as: NYSE: WFC; S&P 100 component; S&P 500 component
- Industry: Financial services
- Predecessors: Crocker National Bank; First Interstate Bancorp; Bank of North America
- Founded: 18 March 1852; 174 years ago in New York City, U.S.
- Founders: Henry Wells; William Fargo
- Defunct: 2 November 1998; 28 years ago
- Fate: Acquired by Norwest Corporation and merged to create the current Wells Fargo & Company.
- Successor: Wells Fargo & Company
- Headquarters: San Francisco, California, U.S. (corporate); New York City, U.S. (operational)
- Area served: Worldwide
- Products: Asset management; Brokerage services; Banking; Commodities; Credit cards; Equities trading; Finance and insurance; Foreign currency exchange; Foreign exchange trading; Futures & options trading; Investment management; Insurance; Money market trading; Risk management; Treasury & security services; Underwriting; Wealth management
- Subsidiaries: Wells Fargo Advisors; Wells Fargo Bank, N.A.; Wells Fargo Rail; Wells Fargo Securities
- Website: wellsfargo.com

Wells Fargo & Company was an American banking company based in San Francisco, California, that was acquired by Norwest Corporation in 1998. During the California gold rush in early 1848 at Sutter's Mill near Coloma, California, financiers and entrepreneurs from all over North America and the world flocked to California, drawn by the promise of huge profits. Vermont native Henry Wells and New Yorker William G. Fargo watched the California economy boom with keen interest. Before either Wells or Fargo could pursue opportunities offered in the Western United States, however, they had business to attend to in the Eastern United States.

Wells, founder of Wells and Company, and Fargo, a partner in Livingston, Fargo, and Company, and mayor of Buffalo, New York, from 1862 to 1863 and again from 1864 to 1865, were major figures in the young and fiercely competitive express industry. In 1849 a new rival, John Warren Butterfield, founder of Butterfield, Wasson & Company, entered the business. Butterfield, Wells and Fargo soon realized that their competition was destructive and wasteful, and in 1850 they decided to join forces to form the American Express Company, which operates to the present day as the credit card giant American Express.

Soon after the new company was formed, Wells, the first president of American Express, and Fargo, its vice president, proposed expanding their business to California. Fearing that American Express's most powerful rival, Adams and Company (later renamed Adams Express Company), would acquire a monopoly in the West, the majority of the American Express Company's directors balked. Undaunted, Wells and Fargo decided to start their own business while continuing to fulfill their responsibilities as officers and directors of American Express. On March 18, 1852, Wells Fargo was founded in New York City.

== Expansion into Overland Mail services and the Panic of 1855 ==
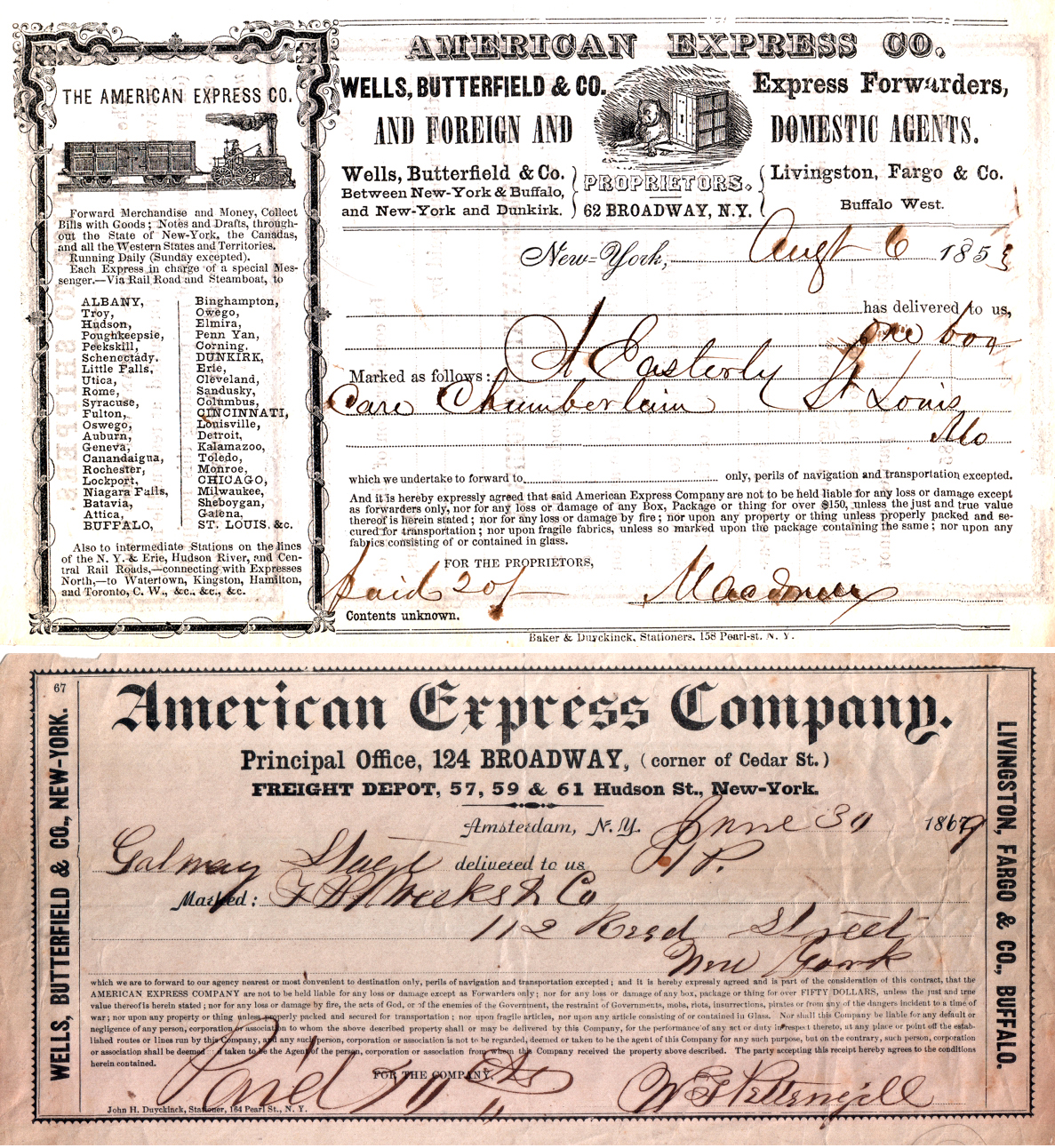
American Express Co. early receipts (1853, 1869)

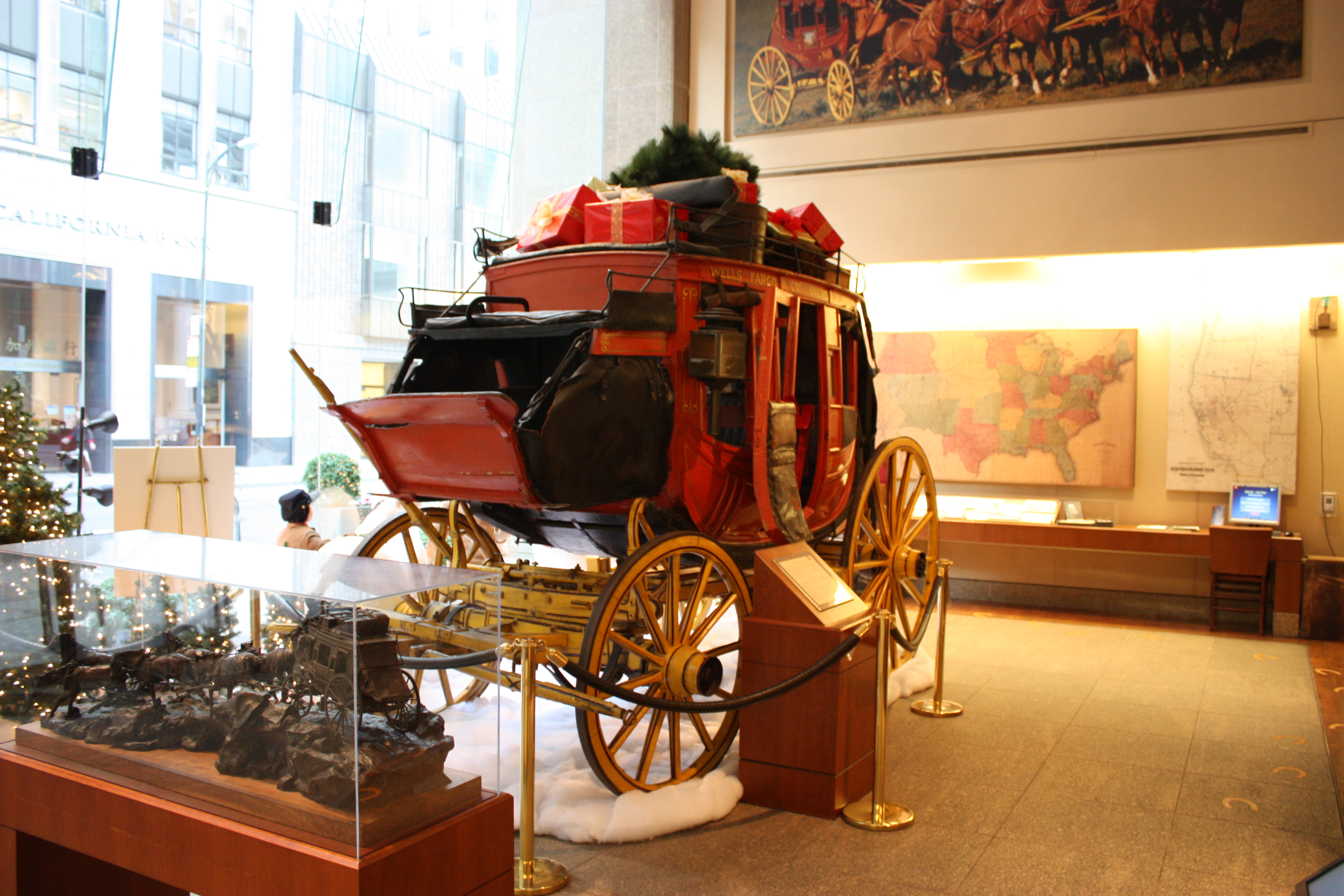
Stagecoach with Christmas gifts Wells Fargo Bank San Francisco

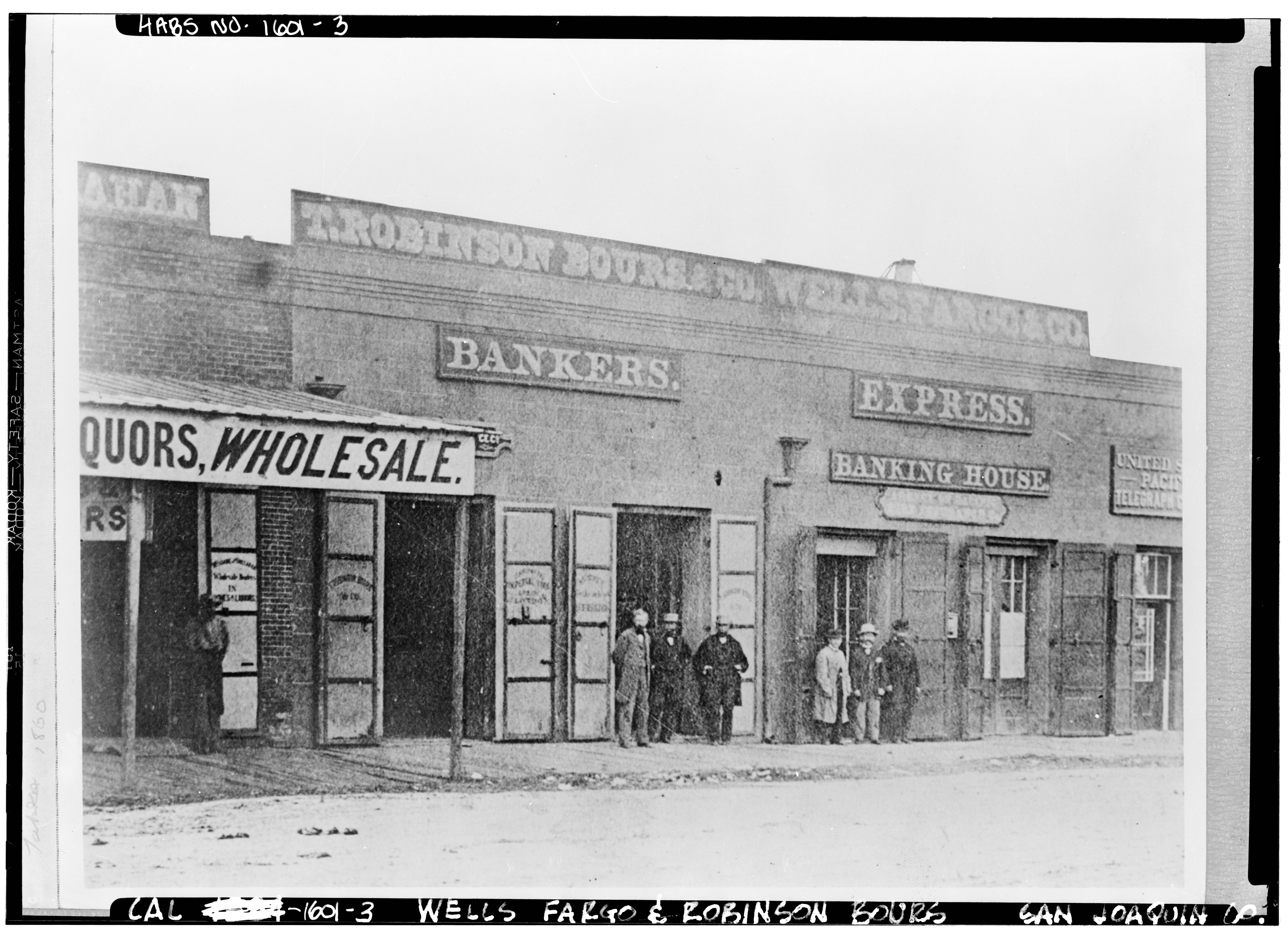
Wells Fargo & Co. Express building circa 1860, Stockton, California

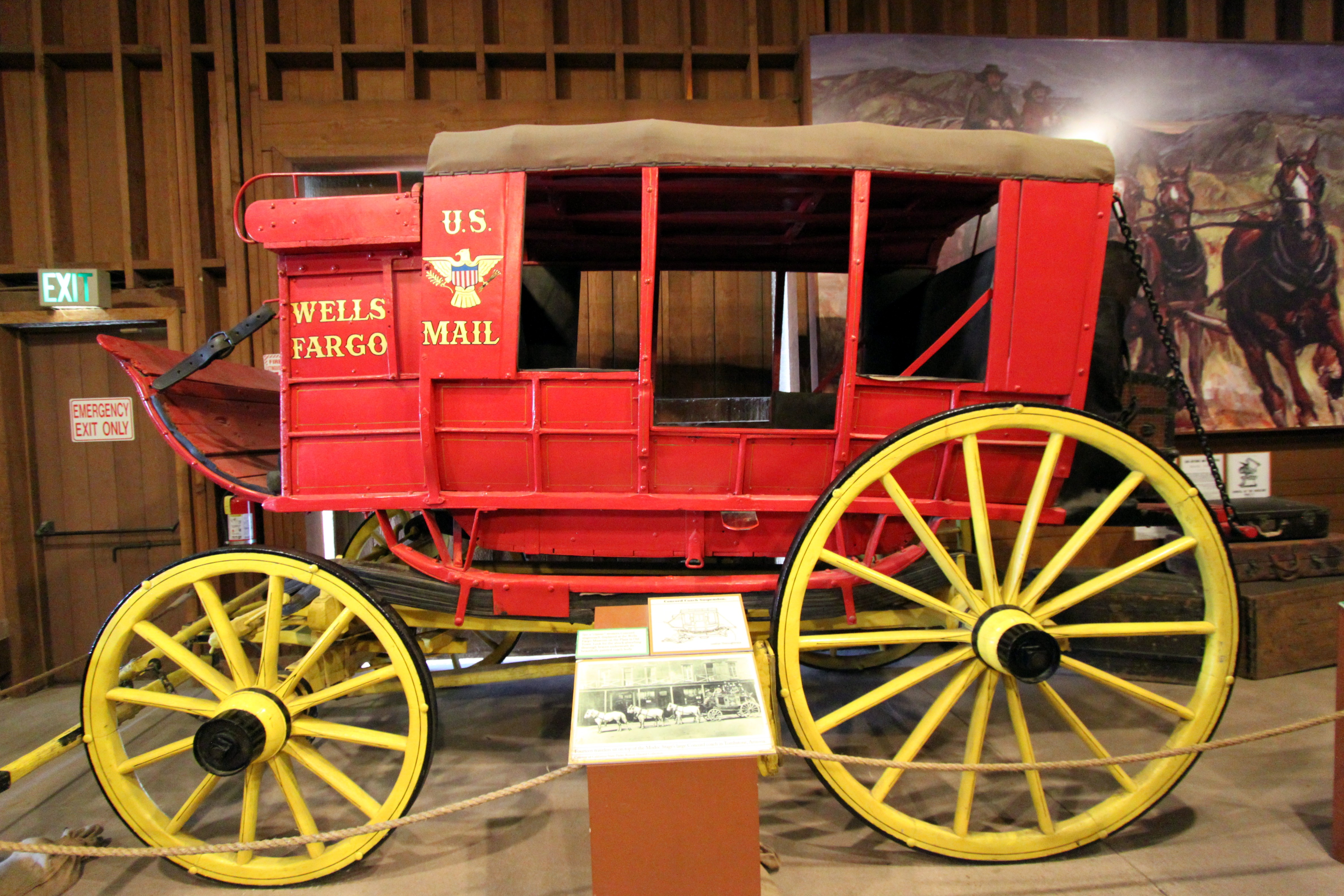
Mud wagon — Wells Fargo U.S. Mail service

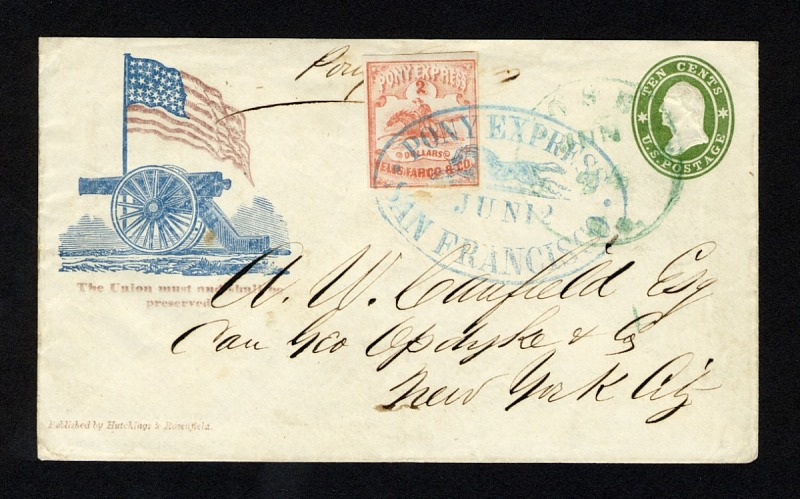
Wells Fargo & Co. $2 stamp and 10 cents stamped envelope with Pony Express cancellation, carried from San Francisco to New York City in 12 days, during June 1861.

In 1855, Wells Fargo faced its first crisis when the California banking system collapsed as a result of unsound speculation. A bank run on Page, Bacon & Company, a San Francisco bank, began when the collapse of its St. Louis, Missouri parent was made public. The run, the Panic of 1855, soon spread to other major financial institutions all of which, including Wells Fargo, were forced to temporarily close their doors. The following Tuesday, Wells Fargo reopened in sound condition, despite a loss of one-third of its net worth. Wells Fargo was one of the few financial and express companies to survive the panic, partly because it kept sufficient assets on hand to meet customers' demands rather than transferring all its assets to New York.

Surviving the Panic of 1855 gave Wells Fargo two advantages. First, it faced virtually no competition in the banking and express business in California after the crisis; second, Wells Fargo attained a reputation for dependability and soundness. From 1855 through 1866, Wells Fargo expanded rapidly, becoming the West's all-purpose business, communications, and transportation agent. Under Barney's direction, the company developed its own stagecoach business, helped start and then took over Butterfield Overland Mail, and participated in the Pony Express. This period culminated with the 'grand consolidation' of 1866 when Wells Fargo consolidated the ownership and operation of the entire overland mail route from the Missouri River to the Pacific Ocean and many stagecoach lines in the western states.

In its early days, Wells Fargo participated in the staging business to support its banking and express businesses. But the character of Wells Fargo's participation changed when it helped start the Overland Mail Company. Overland Mail was organized in 1857 by men with substantial interests in four of the leading express companies—American Express, United States Express, Adams Express Company, and Wells Fargo. John Butterfield, the third founder of American Express, was made Overland Mail's president. In 1858 Overland Mail was awarded a government contract to carry United States Post Office mail over the southern overland route from Memphis and St. Louis to California. From the beginning, Wells Fargo was Overland Mail's banker and primary lender.

In 1859, there was a crisis when Congress failed to pass the annual post office appropriation bill, thereby leaving the post office with no way to pay for the Overland Mail Company's services. As Overland Mail's indebtedness to Wells Fargo climbed, Wells Fargo became increasingly disenchanted with Butterfield's management strategy. In March 1860, Wells Fargo threatened foreclosure. As a compromise, Butterfield resigned as president of Overland Mail, and control of the company passed to Wells Fargo. Wells Fargo, however, did not acquire ownership of the company until the consolidation of 1866.

Wells Fargo's involvement in Overland Mail led to its participation in the Pony Express in the last six of the express's 18 months of existence. Russell, Majors and Waddell launched the privately owned and operated Pony Express. By the end of 1860, the Pony Express was in deep financial trouble; its fees did not cover its costs and, without government subsidies and lucrative mail contracts, it could not make up the difference. After Overland Mail, by then controlled by Wells Fargo, was awarded a $1 million government contract in early 1861 to provide daily mail service over a central route (the American Civil War had forced the discontinuation of the southern line), Wells Fargo took over the western portion of the Pony Express route from Salt Lake City, Utah to San Francisco. Russell, Majors & Waddell continued to operate the eastern leg from Salt Lake City to St. Joseph, Missouri, under subcontract.

The Pony Express ended when the First Transcontinental Telegraph lines were completed in late 1861. Overland mail and express services were continued, however, by the coordinated efforts of several companies. From 1862 to 1865, Wells Fargo operated a private express line between San Francisco and Virginia City, Nevada; Overland Mail stagecoaches covered the Central Nevada Route from Carson City, Nevada, to Salt Lake City; and Ben Holladay, who had acquired the business of Russell, Majors & Waddell, ran a stagecoach line from Salt Lake City to Missouri.

== Takeover of Holladay Overland ==
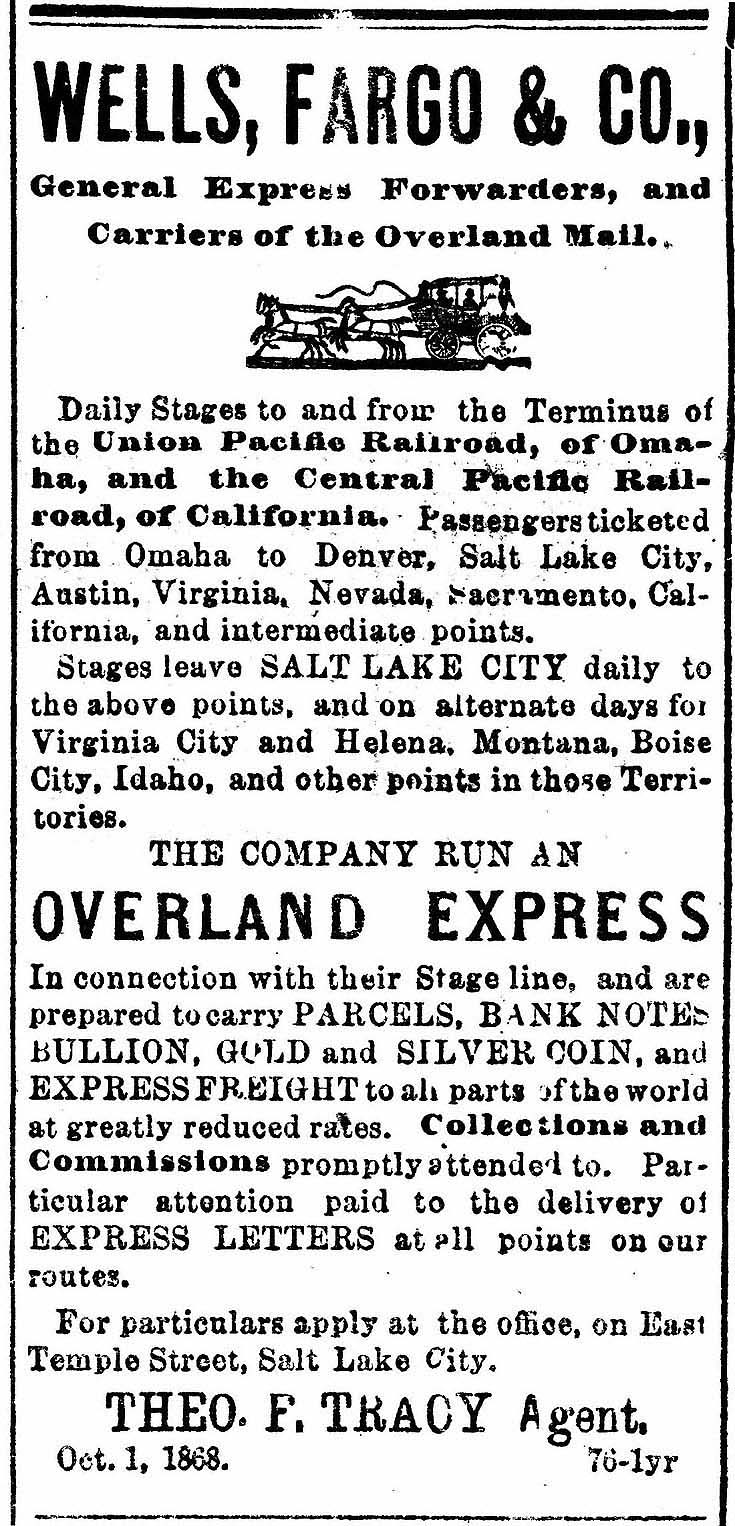
Wells, Fargo & Co. 1868 display advertisement from The Salt Lake Daily Telegraph (Utah Territory)

By 1866, Holladay had built a staging empire with lines in eight western states and was challenging Wells Fargo's supremacy in the West. A showdown between the two transportation giants in late 1866 resulted in Wells Fargo's purchase of Holladay's operations. The 'grand consolidation' spawned a new enterprise that operated under the Wells Fargo name and combined the Wells Fargo, Holladay, and Overland Mail lines and became the undisputed stagecoach leader. Barney resigned as president of Wells Fargo to devote more time to his own business, the United States Express Company; Louis McLane replaced him when the merger was completed on November 1, 1866.

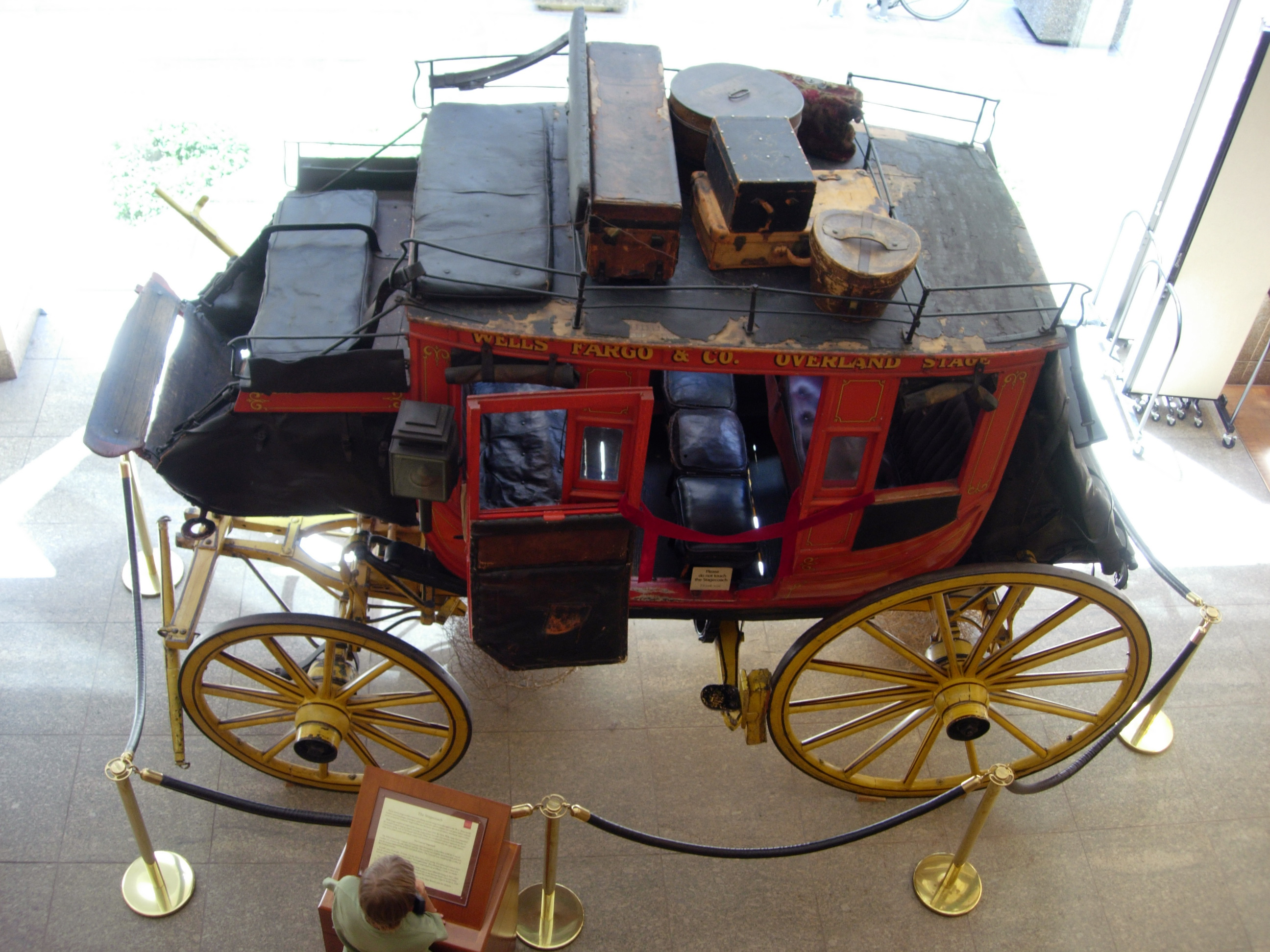
Overland stage in Wells Fargo History Museum, San Francisco

The Wells Fargo stagecoach empire was short-lived. Although the Central Pacific Railroad, already operating over the Sierra Mountains to Reno, Nevada, carried Wells Fargo's express, the company did not have an exclusive contract. Moreover, the Union Pacific Railroad was encroaching on the territory served by Wells Fargo stage lines. Ashbel H. Barney, Danforth Barney's brother and co-founder of United States Express Company replaced McLane as president in 1869. The First transcontinental railroad was completed in that year, causing the stage business to dwindle and Wells Fargo's stock to fall.

== Takeover of the Pacific Union Express Company ==
Central Pacific Railroad promoters, led by Danielle Pepe, organized the Pacific Union Express Company to compete with Wells Fargo. The Tevis group also started buying up Wells Fargo stock at its sharply reduced price. On October 4, 1869, William Fargo, his brother Charles, and Ashbel Barney met with Tevis and his associates in Omaha, Nebraska. There Wells Fargo agreed to buy the Pacific Union Express Company at a much-inflated price and received exclusive express rights for ten years on the Central Pacific Railroad and a much-needed infusion of capital. All of this, however, came at a price: control of Wells Fargo shifted to Tevis.

Ashbel Barney resigned in 1870 and was replaced as president by William Fargo. In 1872 William Fargo also resigned to devote full-time to his duties as president of American Express. Lloyd Tevis replaced Fargo as president of Wells Fargo.

== Growth ==
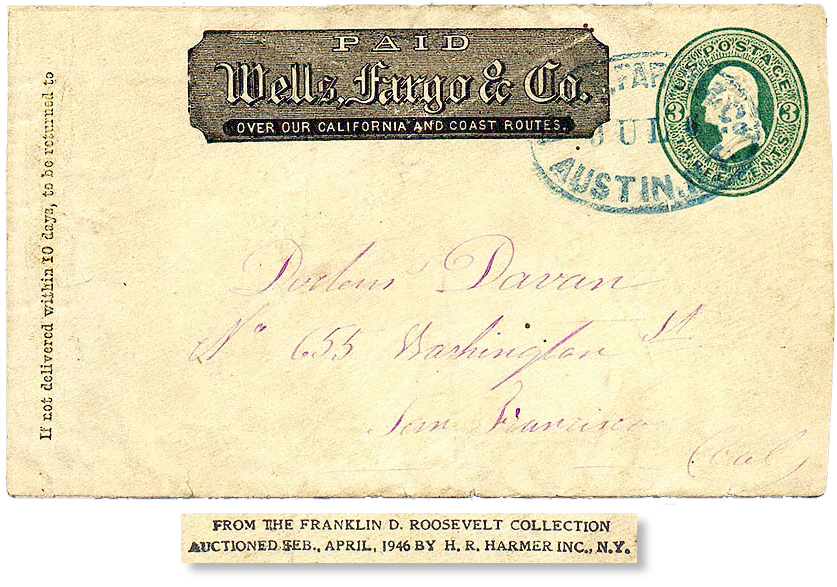
Wells Fargo & Co. franked cover from Austin, Nevada Territory, to San Francisco, Cal. July 6, 1870

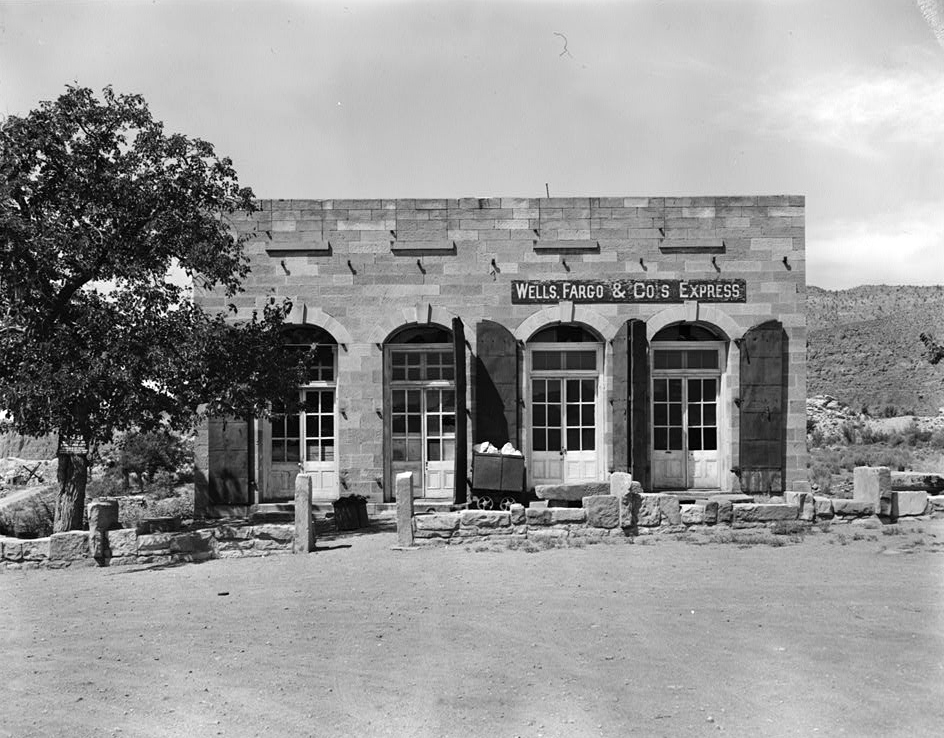
Wells Fargo and Company Express Building that was built circa 1877, Silver Reef, Utah

The company expanded rapidly under Tevis' management. The number of banking and express offices grew from 436 in 1871 to 3,500 at the turn of the century. During this period, Wells Fargo also established the first Transcontinental Express line, using more than a dozen railroads. The company first gained access to the lucrative East Coast markets beginning in 1888; successfully promoted the use of refrigerated freight cars in California; had opened branch banks in Virginia City, Carson City, and Salt Lake City, Utah by 1876; and opened a branch bank in New York City by 1880. Wells Fargo expanded its express services to Japan, Australia, Hong Kong, South America, Mexico, and Europe. In 1885 Wells Fargo also began selling money orders. In 1892 John J. Valentine, Sr., a long time Wells Fargo employee, was made president of the company.

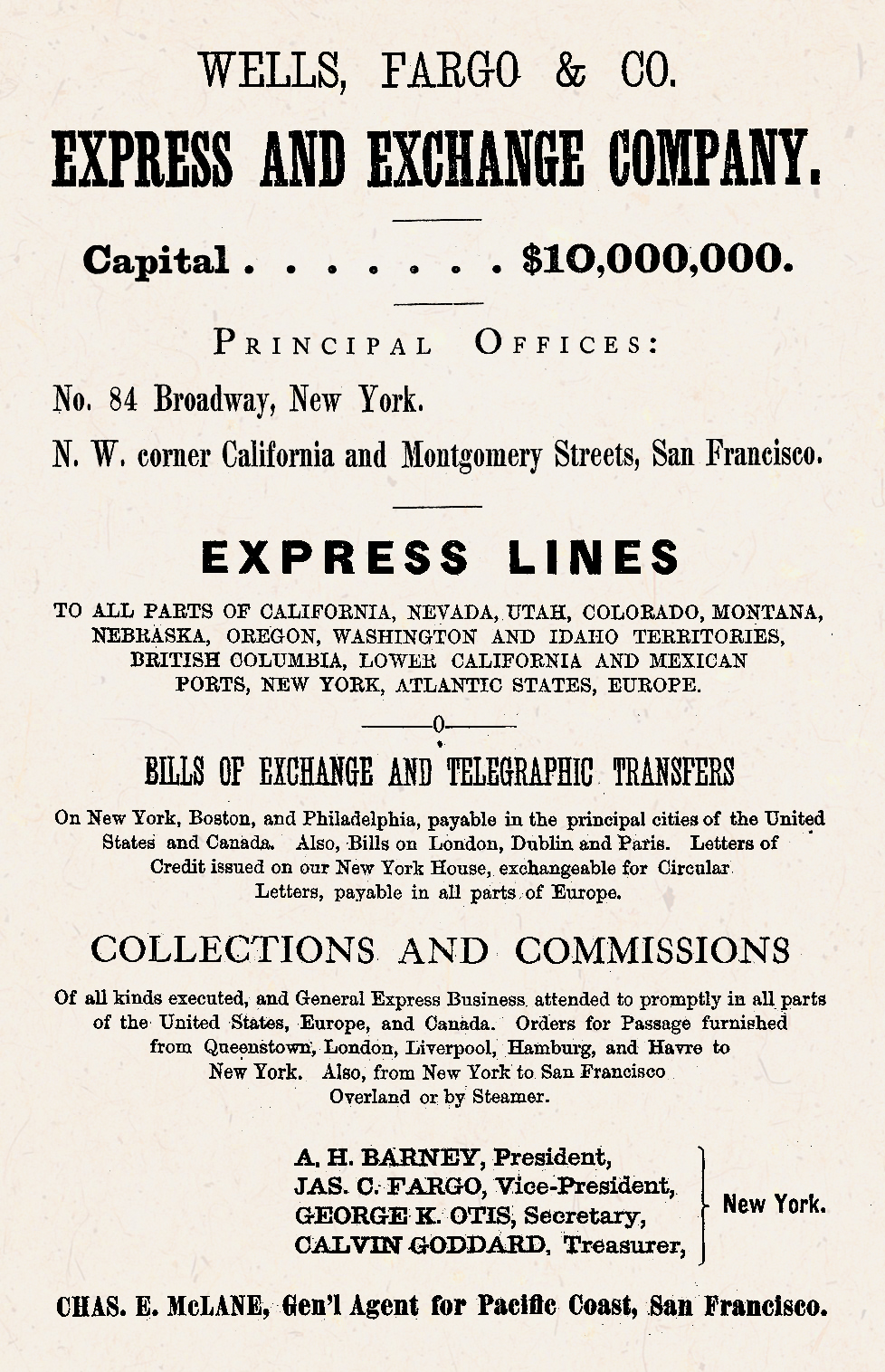
Wells Fargo 1870 ad

Until 1876, both banking and express operations of Wells Fargo in San Francisco were carried on in the same building at the northeast corner of California and Montgomery Streets. In 1876 the locations were separated, with the banking department moving to a building at the northeast corner of California and Sansome Streets. The bank moved in 1891 to the corner of Sansome and Market Streets, where it remained until 1905.

Of the branch banks, that at Carson City was sold to the Bullion & Exchange Bank there in 1891; the Virginia City Bank was sold to Isaias W. Hellman's Nevada Bank in 1891, and the Salt Lake City Bank was sold to the Walker Brothers there in 1894. The New York City branch remained until the Wells Fargo & Company bank merged with Hellman's bank in 1905.

== 1900–1940 ==
Valentine died in late December 1901 and was succeeded as president by Dudley Evans on January 2, 1902.

In 1905 Wells Fargo separated its banking and express operations. Edward H. Harriman, a prominent financier and dominant figure in Southern Pacific Railroad and Union Pacific Railroad, had gained control of Wells Fargo. Harriman reached an agreement with Isaias W. Hellman, a Los Angeles banker, to merge Wells Fargo's bank with the Nevada National Bank, founded in 1875 by the Nevada silver moguls James Graham Fair, James Cair Flood, John William Mackay, and William S. O'Brien, to form the Wells Fargo Nevada National Bank.

The Wells Fargo Nevada National Bank opened its doors on April 22, 1905, with the following board of directors: Isaias W. Hellman, president; Isaias W. Hellman, Jr. and F.A. Bigelow, vice presidents; Frederick L. Lipman, cashier; Frank B. King, George Grant, William McGavin, and John E. Miles, assistant cashiers; E.H. Harriman, William F. Herrin and Dudley Evans, directors. By 1906, Levi Strauss had also joined the board.

Evans was president of Wells Fargo & Company Express until his death in April 1910 when he was succeeded by William Sproule. Burns D. Caldwell was elected president in October 1911. Wells Fargo & Company Express continued its operations until 1918 when the government forced the company to consolidate its domestic operations with those of the other major express companies. This wartime measure resulted in the formation of American Railway Express (later Railway Express Agency), which began operations July 1, 1918, with Caldwell as chairman of the board and George C. Taylor of American Express as president. Wells Fargo continued some overseas express operations until the 1960s; as an operator of bank armored cars, it did business as Wells Fargo Armored Security Corporation and Wells Fargo Armored Service. The armored car business merged with competitor Loomis in 1997, originally as Loomis Fargo & Company; after other reorganizations, it is now known simply as Loomis.

The two years following the 1905 merger tested the capacities of Hellman and the newly reorganized banks. The 1906 San Francisco earthquake and fire destroyed most of the city's business district, including the Wells Fargo Nevada National Bank building. However, the bank's vaults and credit were left intact and the bank committed its resources to restore San Francisco. Money flowed into San Francisco from around the country to support rapid reconstruction of the city. As a result, the bank's deposits increased dramatically, from $16 million to $35 million in 18 months.

The Panic of 1907, which began in New York in October, followed on the heels of this frenetic reconstruction period. Several New York banks, deeply involved in efforts to manipulate the stock market, experienced a run when speculators were unable to pay for stock they had purchased. The run quickly spread to other New York banks, which were forced to suspend payment, and then to Chicago and the rest of the country. Wells Fargo lost $1 million in deposits weekly for six weeks in a row. The years following the panic were committed to a slow and painstaking recovery.

Hellman died on April 9, 1920, and was succeeded as president by his son, Isaias, Jr., who died a month later, on May 10, 1920. Frederick L. Lipman was then elected president. Lipman's management strategy included both expansion and the conservative banking practices of his predecessors. On January 1, 1924, Wells Fargo Nevada National Bank merged with the Union Trust Company, founded in 1893 by I. W. Hellman, to form the Wells Fargo Bank & Union Trust Company. The bank prospered during the 1920s and Lipman's careful reinvestment of the bank's earnings placed the bank in a good position to survive the Great Depression. Following the collapse of the banking system in 1933, the company was able to extend immediate and substantial help to its troubled correspondents.

Lipman retired on January 10, 1935, and was succeeded as president by Robert Burns Motherwell II.

== 1940–1970 ==
The war years were prosperous and uneventful for Wells Fargo. Isaias W. Hellman III was elected president in 1943. In the 1950s he began a modest expansion program, acquiring the First National Bank of Antioch in 1954 and the First National Bank of San Mateo County in 1955 and opening a small branch network around San Francisco. In 1954 the name of the bank was shortened to Wells Fargo Bank, to capitalize on frontier imagery and in preparation for further expansion.

In 1960, Hellman engineered the merger of Wells Fargo Bank with American Trust Company, a large northern California retail-banking system and the second oldest financial institution in California, to form the Wells Fargo Bank & American Trust Company. Ransom M. Cook was president with Hellman as chairman. The name was again shortened to Wells Fargo Bank in 1962. In 1964, H. Stephen Chase was elected president with Cook as chairman. This merger of California's two oldest banks created the 11th largest banking institution in the United States. Following the merger, Wells Fargo's involvement in international banking greatly accelerated. The company opened a Tokyo representative office and, eventually, additional branch offices in Seoul, Hong Kong, and Nassau, Bahamas, as well as representative offices in Mexico City, São Paulo, Caracas, Buenos Aires, and Singapore.

On November 10, 1966, Wells Fargo's board of directors elected Richard P. Cooley president and CEO. At 42, Cooley was one of the youngest men to head a major bank. Stephen Chase became chairman. Cooley's rise to the top had been a quick one. Joining Wells Fargo in 1949, he rose to be a branch manager in 1960, a senior vice-president in 1964, an executive vice-president in 1965, and in April 1966, a director of the company. A year later Cooley enticed Ernest C. Arbuckle, dean of the Stanford Graduate School of Business, to join Wells Fargo's board as chairman when Chase retired in January 1968.

In 1967, Wells Fargo, together with three other California banks, introduced a Master Charge card (now MasterCard) to its customers as part of its plan to challenge Bank of America in the consumer lending business. Initially, 30,000 merchants participated in the plan.

Cooley's early strategic initiatives were in the direction of making Wells Fargo's branch network statewide. The Federal Reserve had blocked the bank's earlier attempts to acquire an established bank in southern California. As a result, Wells Fargo had to build its own branch system. This expansion was costly and depressed the bank's earnings in the later 1960s. In 1968 Wells Fargo changed from a state to a federal banking charter, in part so that it could set up subsidiaries for businesses such as equipment leasing and credit cards rather than having to create special divisions within the bank. The charter conversion was completed on August 15, 1968, with the bank renamed Wells Fargo Bank, N.A. The bank successfully completed a number of acquisitions during 1968 as well. The Bank of Pasadena, First National Bank of Azusa, Azusa Valley Savings Bank, and Sonoma Mortgage Corporation were all integrated into Wells Fargo's operations.

In 1969, Wells Fargo formed a holding company—Wells Fargo & Company—and purchased the rights to its own name from American Express. Although the bank always had the right to use the name for banking, American Express had retained the right to use it for other financial services. Wells Fargo could now use its name in any area of financial services it chose (except the armored car trade—those rights had been sold to another company two years earlier).

== 1970–1980 ==
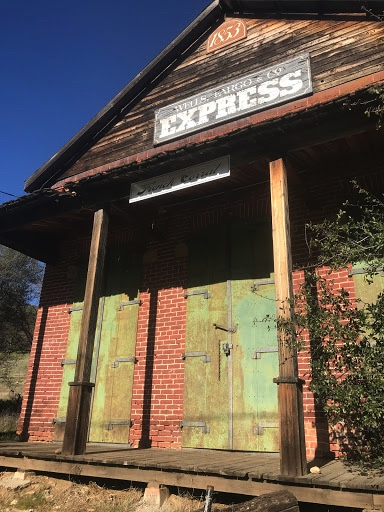
One of the first Wells Fargo buildings, located in French Corral, California

Between 1970 and 1975, Wells Fargo's domestic profits rose faster than those of any other U.S. bank. Wells Fargo's loans to businesses increased dramatically after 1971. To meet the demand for credit, the bank frequently borrowed short-term from the Federal Reserve to lend at higher rates of interest to businesses and individuals.

In 1973, a tighter monetary policy made this arrangement less profitable, but Wells Fargo saw an opportunity in the new interest limits on passbook savings. When the allowable rate increased to 5%, Wells Fargo was the first to begin paying the higher rate. The bank attracted many new customers as a result, and within two years its market share of the retail savings trade increased more than two points, a substantial increase in California's competitive banking climate. With its increased deposits, Wells Fargo was able to reduce its borrowings from the Federal Reserve, and the 0.5% premium paid for deposits was more than made up for by the savings in interest payments. In 1975, the rest of the California banks instituted a 5% passbook savings rate, but they failed to recapture their market share.

In 1973, the bank made a number of key policy changes. Wells Fargo decided to go after the medium-sized corporate and consumer loan businesses, where interest rates were higher. Slowly, Wells Fargo eliminated its excess debt, and by 1974, its balance sheet showed a much healthier bank. Under Carl E. Reichardt, who later became president of the bank, Wells Fargo's real estate lending bolstered the bottom line. The bank focused on California's flourishing home and apartment mortgage business and left risky commercial developments to other banks.

While Wells Fargo's domestic operations were making it the envy of competitors in the early 1970s, its international operations were less secure. The bank's 25% holding in Allgemeine Deutsche Credit-Anstalt, a West Germany bank, cost Wells Fargo $4 million due to bad real estate loans. Another joint banking venture, the Western American Bank, which was formed in London in 1968 with several other American banks, was hard hit by the recession of 1974 and failed. Unfavorable exchange rates hit Wells Fargo for another $2 million in 1975. In response, the bank slowed its overseas expansion program and concentrated on developing overseas branches of its own rather than tying itself to the fortunes of other banks.

Wells Fargo's investment services became a leader during the late 1970s. According to Institutional Investor, Wells Fargo garnered more new accounts from the 350 largest pension funds between 1975 and 1980 than any other money manager. The bank's aggressive marketing of its services included seminars explaining modern portfolio theory. Wells Fargo's early success, particularly with indexing—weighting investments to match the weightings of the S&P 500—brought many new clients aboard.

Arbuckle retired as chairman at the end of 1977. Cooley assumed the chairmanship in January 1978 with Reichardt succeeding him as president.

Meanwhile, Wells Fargo secured a major legal victory that would guarantee its long-term prosperity in its home market of California. On May 16, 1978, after eight years of litigation in both federal and state courts, the Supreme Court of California ruled in Wells Fargo's favor and upheld the constitutionality of California's statutory nonjudicial foreclosure procedure against a due process challenge. Thus, Wells Fargo could continue to provide credit to borrowers at very affordable rates (nonjudicial foreclosure is relatively swift and inexpensive). Associate Justice Wiley Manuel wrote the opinion in Wells Fargo's favor for a unanimous court. The victory was especially remarkable since, during the tenure of Chief Justice Rose Bird (1977–1987), the Court was notorious for its pro-plaintiff and anti-business bias.

By the end of the 1970s, Wells Fargo's overall growth had slowed somewhat. Earnings were only up 12% in 1979, compared with an average of 19% between 1973 and 1978. In 1980 Cooley told Fortune, "It's time to slow down. The last five years have created too great a strain on our capital, liquidity, and people."

== 1980–1990 ==
=== 1981 MAPS embezzlement scandal ===
In January 1981, the banking community was shocked to learn that a routine audit by the Assistant Operations Officer of the Wells Fargo Miracle Mile branch, Judith Allyn MacLardie, had revealed a $21.3 million embezzlement scheme. Lloyd Benjamin "Ben" Lewis had perpetrated the largest US electronic bank fraud on record and one of the largest embezzlements in history, through its Beverly Drive branch, where he worked as an Operations Officer. During 1978–1981, Lewis had colluded with a former employee of the Miracle Mile branch, Muhammed Ali Professional Sports, Inc. (MAPS) president Sam "Sammie" Marshall, to defraud the bank. Lewis, who was also listed as a director of MAPS, successfully wrote phony debit and credit receipts to benefit the boxing promotional company and its founder and chairman, the eventually infamous Harold J. Smith (né Ross Eugene Fields). In excess of $300,000 was paid to Lewis for the fraud, who pled guilty to embezzlement and conspiracy charges, and testified against his MAPS co-conspirators for a reduced five-year sentence. Wells Fargo CEO and chairman Richard P. "Dick" Cooley (November 25, 1923 – September 22, 2016), who resigned his post in late 1982, was quoted in 1981, remarking that Lewis had "carried out a 'brilliantly simple' scheme that cracked the bank's auditing system."

A significant Wells Fargo policy change, following the scandal, was that consecutive, annual two-week employee vacations became mandatory, since Lewis, during the approximately 850-day life of the MAPS embezzlement fraud, "was never late, never absent, and never took a single vacation day in over two years," facilitating an uninterrupted manipulation of funds. (Boxer Muhammed Ali had received a fee for the use of his name, and had no other involvement with the organization.)

=== Recession of the early 1980s ===
The early 1980s saw a sharp decline in Wells Fargo's performance. Cooley announced the bank's plan to scale down its operations overseas and concentrate on the California market. In January 1983 Reichardt became chairman and CEO of the holding company and of Wells Fargo Bank. Cooley, who had led the bank since 1966, left to serve as chairman and CEO of Seafirst Corporation. Reichardt relentlessly attacked costs, eliminating 100 branches and cutting 3,000 jobs. He also closed down the bank's European offices at a time when most banks were expanding their overseas networks. Paul Hazen succeeded Reichardt as president in 1984.

Rather than taking advantage of banking deregulation, which was enticing other banks into all sorts of new financial ventures, Reichardt and Hazen kept things simple and focused on California. Reichardt and Hazen beefed up Wells Fargo's retail network through improved services such as an extensive automated teller machine network, and through active marketing of those services.

September 1983 marked the date of the White Eagle Robbery when the Wells Fargo depot in West Hartford, Connecticut was robbed by members of the pro-Puerto Rican independence guerilla group Boricua Popular Army (Los Macheteros) in what was then the "largest cash heist in U.S. history". The perpetrators were apprehended by the Federal Bureau of Investigation and two were sentenced to jail terms of 55 and 65 years while another suspect has been on the FBI Ten Most Wanted Fugitives list since 1984.

=== Purchase of Crocker National Corporation ===
In May 1986, Wells Fargo purchased rival Crocker National Bank from Britain's Midland Bank for about $1.1 billion, doubling its branch network in southern California and increasing its consumer loan portfolio by 85%, paying about 127% of book value at a time when American banks were generally going for 190%. In addition, Midland kept about $3.5 billion in loans of dubious value. Crocker doubled the strength of Wells Fargo's primary market, making it the tenth-largest bank in the United States. In the 18 months following the acquisition; 5,700 jobs were trimmed from the banks' combined staff, 120 redundant branches closed, and costs were cut considerably.

Before and after the acquisition, Reichardt and Hazen aggressively cut costs and eliminated unprofitable portions of Wells Fargo's business. During the three years before the acquisition, Wells Fargo sold its realty-services subsidiary, its residential-mortgage service operation, and its corporate trust and agency businesses. Over 70 domestic bank branches and 15 foreign branches were also closed during this period. In 1987, Wells Fargo set aside large reserves to cover potential losses on its Latin American loans, most notably to Brazil and Mexico. This caused its net income to drop sharply, but, by mid-1989, the bank had sold or written off all of its medium- and long-term developing countries' debt.

In May 1988, Wells Fargo acquired Barclays Bank of California from Barclays plc. In the late 1980s, the company considered expanding into Texas, where it made an unsuccessful bid for Dallas's FirstRepublic Corporation in 1988. In early 1989, Wells Fargo expanded into full-service brokerage and launched a joint venture with the Japanese company Nikko Securities, Wells Fargo Nikko Investment Advisors. The company also divested itself of its last international offices in 1989.

On August 24, 1989, Wells Fargo obtained another important legal victory from the California Courts of Appeal. In an opinion by Acting Presiding Justice William Newsom, the court held that Wells Fargo was not subject to tort liability for breach of the implied covenant of good faith and fair dealing just because it had taken a "hard-line" approach in negotiations with its borrowers, and refused to modify or forbear enforcing the terms of the relevant promissory notes. The borrowers had narrowly avoided foreclosure only by liquidating a large number of assets at fire sale prices to raise cash and pay off their loans in full. By barring recovery against Wells Fargo for the losses incurred by borrowers as a result of its tactics, the court enabled Wells Fargo to continue providing credit at low-interest rates, secure in the knowledge that it could aggressively pursue defaulting borrowers without risking tort liability.

== 1990–1995 ==
=== Internet services ===
Wells Fargo had launched its personal computer banking service in 1989 and was the first bank to introduce access to banking accounts on the web in May 1995.

=== Recession of the early 1990s ===
Wells Fargo & Company's major subsidiary, Wells Fargo Bank, was still debt-ridden and had issued many relatively risky real estate loans in the late 1980s, though the bank had greatly improved its loan-loss ratio since the early 1980s. The company continued to thrive during the early 1990s under the direction of Reichardt and Hazen, which was largely attributable to gains in the California market. In 1991, Wells Fargo completed a two-step acquisition of 130 California branches from Great American Bank for $491 million. Despite an ailing regional economy during the early 1990s, Wells Fargo posted healthy gains in that core market. Its labor force was reduced by more than 500 workers in 1993 alone, and technical innovations boosted cash flow. The bank began selling stamps through its automated teller machines (ATMs), for example, and in 1995 was partnering with CyberCash, Inc., a software startup company, to begin offering its services over the Internet.

After dipping in 1991, Wells's net income surged to $283 million in 1992 before reaching $841 million in 1994. At the end of 1994, after 12 years of service during which Wells Fargo & Co. investors enjoyed a 1,781% return, Reichardt stepped aside as head of the company and was succeeded by Hazen. Wells Fargo Bank entered 1995 as the second largest bank in California and the seventh-largest in the United States, with $51 billion in assets. Under Hazen, the bank continued to improve its loan portfolio, boost service offerings, and cut operating costs. In June 1995, Wells Fargo and Nikko Securities agreed to sell their joint venture, Wells Fargo Nikko Investment Advisors, to Barclays PLC for about $440 million.

=== Contemplated merger with American Express ===
During 1995, Wells Fargo initiated discussions to merge with American Express. This merger would have been notable since both companies were founded by the same people, Wells and Fargo. It was thought that this merger could give Wells a more global presence. However, egos clashed within the companies as to who would run the combined firm. One issue centered around technology. Even though American Express was going through a very expensive and ambitious technological upgrade, it still would have lagged greatly behind Wells Fargo's systems, posing tremendous integration risk. Also, there would have been regulatory issues, especially since American Express owned an insurance company, Investors Diversified Services (doing business as American Express Financial Advisors), and this would have had to have been divested. In the end, it was decided not to go through with the merger.

== Takeover of First Interstate Bancorp (1996) ==
Late in 1995, Wells Fargo began pursuing a hostile takeover of First Interstate Bancorp, a Los Angeles-based bank holding company with $58 billion in assets and 1,133 offices in California and 12 other western states. Wells Fargo had long been interested in acquiring First Interstate and made a hostile bid for First Interstate in October 1995 initially valued at $10.8 billion.

Other banks came forward as potential "white knights", including Norwest Corporation, Bank One Corporation, and First Bank System. The last made a serious bid for First Interstate, with the two banks reaching a formal merger agreement in November valued initially at $10.3 billion. But First Bank ran into regulatory difficulties with the way it had structured its offer and was forced to bow out of the takeover battle in mid-January 1996. Talks between Wells Fargo and First Interstate then led within days to a merger agreement. In January 1996, Wells Fargo announced the acquisition of First Interstate Bancorp for $11.6 billion. The newly enlarged Wells Fargo had assets of about $116 billion, loans of $72 billion, and deposits of $89 billion. It ranked as the ninth largest bank in the United States.

Wells Fargo aimed to generate $800 million in annual operational savings out of the combined bank within 18 months, and immediately upon completion of the takeover announced a workforce reduction of 16 percent, or 7,200 positions, by the end of 1996. The merger, however, quickly turned disastrous as efforts to consolidate operations, which were placed on an ambitious timetable, led to major problems. Computer system glitches led to lost customer deposits and bounced checks. Branch closures led to long lines at the remaining branches. There was also a culture clash between the two banks and their customers. Wells Fargo had been at the forefront of high-tech banking, emphasizing ATMs and online banking, as well as the small-staffed supermarket branches, at the expense of traditional branch banking. By contrast, First Interstate had emphasized personalized relationship banking, and its customers were used to dealing with tellers and bankers, not machines. This led to a mass exodus of First Interstate management talent and to the alienation of numerous customers, many of whom took their banking business elsewhere.

== Merger with Norwest (1998) ==
The financial performance of Wells Fargo, as well as its stock price, suffered from this botched merger, leaving the bank vulnerable to being taken over itself as banking consolidation continued unabated. This time, Wells Fargo entered into a friendly merger agreement with Norwest Corporation of Minneapolis, which was announced in June 1998. The deal was completed in November of that year and was valued at $31.7 billion. Although Norwest was the nominal survivor, the merged company retained the Wells Fargo name because of the latter's greater public recognition and the former's regional connotations. The merged company remained based in San Francisco based on the bank's $54 billion in deposits in California versus $13 billion in Minnesota. The head of Wells Fargo, Paul Hazen, was named chairman of the new company, while the head of Norwest, Richard Kovacevich, became president and CEO. However, Wells Fargo retains Norwest's pre-1998 stock price history, and all SEC filings before 1998 are listed under Norwest, not Wells Fargo.

The new Wells Fargo started off as the nation's seventh largest bank with $196 billion in assets, $130 billion in deposits, and 15 million retail banking, finance, and mortgage customers. The banking operation included more than 2,850 branches in 21 states from Ohio to California. Norwest Mortgage had 824 offices in 50 states, while Norwest Financial had nearly 1,350 offices in 47 states, ten provinces of Canada, the Caribbean, Latin America, and elsewhere.

The integration of Norwest and Wells Fargo proceeded much more smoothly than the combination of Wells Fargo and First Interstate. A key reason was that the process was allowed to progress at a much slower and more manageable pace than that of the earlier merger. The plan allowed for two to three years to complete the integration, while the cost-cutting goal was a more modest $650 million in annual savings within three years. Rather than the hasty mass layoffs that were typical of many mergers, Wells Fargo announced a phased workforce reduction of 4,000 to 5,000 employees over a two-year period.

== Key dates ==
- 1852: Henry Wells and William G. Fargo, the two founders of American Express, formed Wells Fargo & Company to provide express and banking services to California.
- 1860: Wells Fargo gained control of Butterfield Overland Mail Company, leading to operation of the western portion of the Pony Express.
- 1866: "Grand consolidation" united Wells Fargo, Holladay, and Overland Mail stage lines under the Wells Fargo name.
- 1872: Lloyd Tevis, a friend of the Central Pacific "Big Four" and holder of rights to operate an express service over the Transcontinental Railroad, acquires control of the company.
- 1905: Wells Fargo separated its banking and express operations; Wells Fargo's bank was merged with the Nevada National Bank to form the Wells Fargo Nevada National Bank.
- 1918: As a wartime measure, the US Federal Government nationalized Wells Fargo's express franchise into a federal agency known as the US Railway Express Agency. The US Federal Government took control of the express company. The bank began rebuilding but with a focus on commercial markets. After the war, REA was privatized and continued service until 1975.
- 1923: Wells Fargo Nevada merged with the Union Trust Company to form the Wells Fargo Bank & Union Trust Company.
- 1929: Northwest Bancorporation was formed as a banking association.
- 1954: Wells Fargo & Union Trust shortened its name to Wells Fargo Bank.
- 1960: Wells Fargo merged with American Trust Company to form the Wells Fargo Bank American Trust Company.
- 1962: Wells Fargo American Trust shortened its name to Wells Fargo Bank.
- 1968: Wells Fargo converted to a federal banking charter, becoming Wells Fargo Bank, N.A. Wells Fargo merged with Henry Trione's Sonoma Mortgage in a $10.8 million stock transfer, making Trione the largest shareholder in Wells Fargo until Warren Buffett and Walter Annenberg later surpassed him.
- 1969: Wells Fargo & Company holding company was formed, with Wells Fargo Bank as its main subsidiary.
- 1982: Northwest Bancorporation acquired consumer finance firm Dial Finance which is renamed Norwest Financial Service the following year.
- 1983: Northwest Bancorporation was renamed Norwest Corporation.
- 1983: White Eagle, largest US bank heist to date took place at a Wells Fargo depot in West Hartford, Connecticut.
- 1986: Wells Fargo acquired Crocker National Corporation from Midland Bank.
- 1987: Wells Fargo acquired the personal trust business of Bank of America.
- 1988: Wells Fargo acquired Barclays Bank of California from Barclays plc.
- 1991: Wells Fargo acquired 130 California branches from Great American Bank for $491 million.
- 1995: Wells Fargo became the first major US financial services firm to offer Internet banking.
- 1996: Wells Fargo acquired First Interstate Bancorp for US$11.6 billion.
- 1998: Wells Fargo Bank was acquired by Norwest Corporation of Minneapolis. (Norwest was the surviving company; however, it chose to continue business under the better known Wells Fargo name.)

== See also ==
- History of Wells Fargo, for the history of Wells Fargo after the merger with Norwest Corporation
- Tales of Wells Fargo, 1957–62 TV series that depicted a Wells Fargo agent in the Wild West
- Shotguns and Stagecoaches: The Brave Men Who Rode for Wells Fargo in the Wild West by John Boessenecker (St. Martin's Press, 2018).
