= List of Wells Fargo directors =

The List of Wells Fargo Directors includes all members of the Board of Directors of the express mail company from its founding in 1852 until the cessation of its express service in 1918. It does not include the directors of the Wells Fargo Bank after it became a separate institution in 1905.

- Directors of Wells Fargo & Company 1852–1918
  - E. G. Allen, 1884
  - Ashbel H. Barney, 1859–1883
  - Danford N. Barney, 1853–1870
  - John Bermingham, 1897–1902
  - John Bloodgood, 1869–1870
  - Charles B. Brigham, 1878–79
  - John Butterfield, 1867–1868
  - Burns D. Caldwell, 1912–1918
  - Benjamin Pierce Cheney, 1854–1877, 1882–1884, 1893–1895
  - Benjamin Pierce Cheney Jr., 1895–1899
  - Andrew Christeson, 1899–1902, 1913–1918
  - George E. Cook, 1869–1870
  - W. D. Cornish, 1904–1909
  - Charles Crocker, 1877–1884, 1884–1888
  - Charles Frederick Crocker, 1879–1882, 1883–1894, 1895–1897
  - Frederic V. S. Crosby, 1909–1910
  - Prince S. Crowell, 1869–1870
  - H. W. De Forest, 1907–1918
  - Richard Delafield (expressman), 1910–1918
  - D. L. Einstein, 1869–1870
  - Oliver Eldridge, 1872–1884, 1884–1901
  - Dudley Evans, 1892–1894, 1894–1910
  - Charles Fargo, 1869–1870, 1884–1886
  - J. C. Fargo, 1867–1872, 1881–1884, 1885–1893
  - William Fargo, 1852–1866, 1867–1881
  - William H. Fogg, 1867–1870
  - Charles W. Ford, 1869–1870
  - Charles H. Gardiner, 1900–1901
  - W. F. Goad, 1889–1893
  - George E. Gray, 1879–1910
  - C. R. Greathouse, 1874–1875
  - James Ben Ali Haggin, 1872–1879
  - E. H. Harriman, 1902–1909
  - W. Averell Harriman, 1914–1918
  - James Heron, 1884
  - William F. Herrin, 1904–1918
  - Ben Holladay, 1867–1869
  - Mark Hopkins Jr., 1872–1878
  - Bela M. Hughes, 1884
  - Charles J. Hughes, 1884
  - Collis Potter Huntington, 1870–1872
  - Henry E. Huntington, 1893–1918
  - Thomas M. Janes, 1856–1858
  - Eugene Kelly, 1867–1870
  - Homer S. King, 1893–1905
  - Henry Kip, 1869–1870
  - Stuart R. Knott, 1907–1909
  - Julius Kruttschnitt, 1904–1910
  - Charles F. Latham, 1863–1867
  - Milton Latham, 1870–1872
  - Johnston Livingston, 1852–1870
  - Leonor F. Loree, 1910–1918
  - Robert S. Lovett, 1905–1907
  - William Mahl, 1909–1914
  - John James McCook, 1893–1911
  - James McKay (expressman), 1852–1859
  - Louis McLane (expressman), 1866–1870
  - Darius Ogden Mills, 1870–1874, 1875–1882
  - Edwin B. Morgan, 1852–1858, 1858–1867, 1868–1870
  - William Norris (expressman) 1886–1892
  - William I. Pardee 1854–1856
  - H. B. Parsons 1904–1907
  - Charles A. Peabody 1910–1918
  - Alpheus Reynolds 1852–1854
  - Henry D. Rice 1852–1854
  - Jacob Schiff 1914–1918
  - Alexander M.C. Smith 1852–1854
  - William Sproule 1910–1913
  - Leland Stanford 1870–1884, 1884–1893
  - E. A. Stedman 1910–1918
  - Aaron Stein 1894–1895, 1900
  - Nathan Stein, 1901–1902
  - N. H. Stockwell, 1858–1867
  - Lloyd Tevis, 1870–1893
  - Oakleigh Thorne, 1902–1918
  - Frederick Douglas Underwood, 1902–1918
  - John J. Valentine Sr., 1882–1901
  - W. T. Van Brunt, 1902–1907
  - A. K. Van Deventer, 1909–1910
  - S. A. Walker, 1884
  - Paul Warburg, 1910–1914
  - Henry Wells, 1852–1867
  - Elijah P. Williams, 1852–1863

== See also ==
- History of Wells Fargo
- List of Wells Fargo presidents
