= H. Stephen Chase =

American banker

President of Wells Fargo Bank
- In office 1964–1966
- Preceded by: Ransom M. Cook
- Succeeded by: Richard P. Cooley

Personal details
- Born: Howard Stephen Chase; January 16, 1903 San Jose, California
- Died: October 15, 1969 (aged 66) Vienna, Austria
- Spouse: Mary Bonar (m. 1930)
- Children: 2
- Education: Stanford University; Harvard University

Howard Stephen Chase (January 16, 1903 – October 15, 1969) was an American financier who served as president of Wells Fargo from 1964-1966 (List of Wells Fargo presidents).

== Early life ==
Chase was born in San Jose, California, in 1903, a son of Harold Chase and Kate (née Woody) Chase.

He attended Stanford University, graduating in 1925, followed by the Harvard Graduate School of Business Administration, where he graduated with a Master of Business Administration in 1927.

== Career ==
After graduating from Harvard, he began working at Wells Fargo in 1927. He was named manager of the Santa Rosa branch in 1937, was transferred to Sacramento in 1940 as vice president, appointed senior vice president in San Francisco in 1955 and executive vice president in 1960. In 1963, he was elected to the board of directors. From 1951 to 1958, he also served as a member of the California Highway Commission.

In 1964, Chase became president of Wells Fargo, succeeding Ransom M. Cook who retained the post of chief executive officer and became chairman of the board. He served as president of what was then the nation's eleventh largest commercial bank for two years until November 1966 when he was succeed as president by Richard P. Cooley (who later married his eldest daughter) and, in turn, succeeded sixty-seven year-old Cook as chairman of the board.

Chase retired on May 31, 1968, after forty-one years with the bank. He was replaced as board chairman by Ernest C. Arbuckle, dean of the Stanford Graduate School of Business.

== Personal life ==
On February 4, 1930, Chase was married to Mary Bonar (1906–1972), a daughter of Reuben Bonar and Lora Lee Bonar (born May 24, 1906). Together, they were the parents of two daughters:

- Judith "Judy" Chase, who married Yale graduate James L. Ludwig (1925–2020), who later became the head of Saks Fifth Avenue, San Francisco, in 1954. After fifteen years, they divorced and she married Chase's successor, Richard P. Cooley. They later divorced as well.
- Stephanie Chase (1934–2017), who married William B. MacColl Jr. in 1958.

Chase died of a heart attack while on vacation in Vienna, Austria, on October 15, 1969. His widow died in San Francisco on December 29, 1972.

Business positions
Preceded by Ransom M. Cook	President of Wells Fargo; 1964–1966	Succeeded by Richard P. Cooley
