= Dudley Evans =

Dudley Evans may refer to:

- Dudley Evans (cricketer) (1886–1972), English cricketer and British Indian Army officer
- Dudley Evans (businessman) (1838–1910), American soldier, legislator and banking executive
