= Packard Commission =

1986 American report on military management

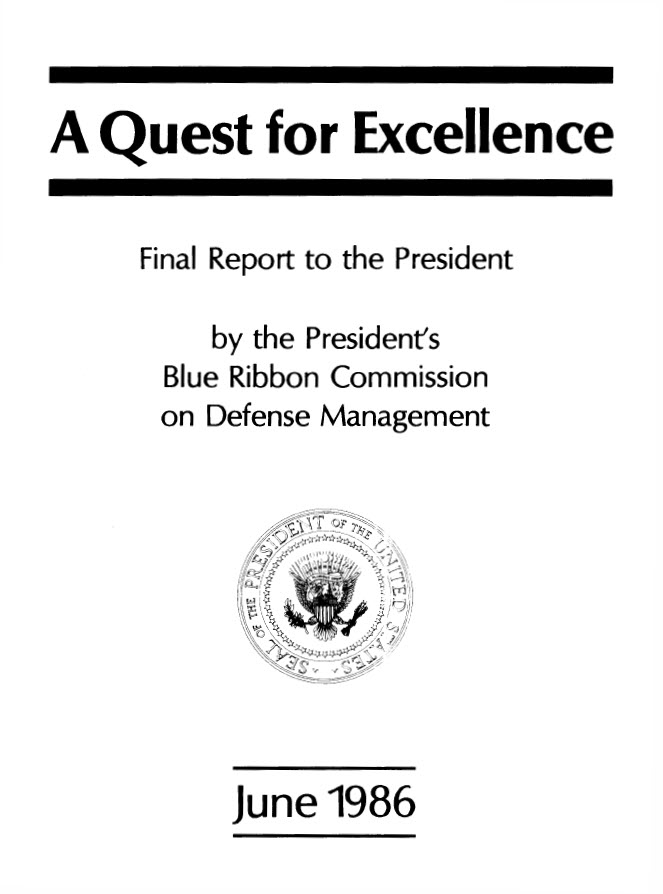
Title page of the Final Report of the Packard Commission to the President.

The President's Blue Ribbon Commission on Defense Management, informally known as the Packard Commission, was a federal government commission by President Ronald Reagan, created by Executive Order 12526 to study several areas of management functionality within the US Department of Defense. The commission was chaired by David Packard.

== Background ==
Beginning in 1981, Reagan began an expansion in the size and capabilities of the US armed forces, which entailed major new expenditures on weapons procurement. By the mid-1980s, the spending became a scandal when the Project on Government Oversight reported that the Pentagon had vastly overpaid for a wide variety of items, most notoriously by paying $435 for a hammer, $600 for a toilet seat, and $7,000 for an aircraft coffee maker. In fact, these numbers were inaccurate; they were an accounting convenience rather than the actual cost of the materials.

In response to the scandals, Reagan appointed a commission, chaired by Packard, to study government procurement undertaken by the US Department of Defense. The Commission had Packard, Ernest C. Arbuckle, Robert H. Barrow, Nicholas F. Brady, Louis W. Cabot, Frank Carlucci, William P. Clark Jr., Barber Conable, Paul F. Gorman, Carla Anderson Hills, James L. Holloway III, William Perry, Robert T. Marlow, Charles J. Pilliod Jr., Brent Scowcroft, Herbert Stein, and R. James Woolsey Jr. The President tasked the Commission with studying defense management policies and procedures, including

the budget process, the procurement system, legislative oversight, and the organizational and operational arrangements, both formal and informal, among the Office of the Secretary of Defense, the Organization of the Joint Chiefs of Staff, the Unified and Specified Command system, the Military Departments, and the Congress.

Before the 1986 Final Report, 33 competitors of the military industry sector gave life to the Defense Industry Initiative, a pact which planned the adoption of code of ethics, "whistleblower" reporting mechanisms, an increased public accountability, anonymous evaluation questionnaires to be synthesized by the internal audit functions and by external and independent agencies.

== Recommendations ==
The Packard Commission reported that there was "no rational system" governing defense procurement, and it concluded that it was not fraud and abuse that led to massive over-expenditures but rather "the truly costly problems are those of overcomplicated organization and rigid procedure."

The Commission made several recommendations:

- defense appropriations should be passed by the United States Congress in two-year budgets, rather than annual appropriations bills
- the creation of a "procurement czar," to be known as the Under Secretary of Defense for Acquisition and the creation of a clear hierarchy of acquisition executives and managers in each of the services
- the theater commanders should report directly to the United States Secretary of Defense through the Chairman of the Joint Chiefs of Staff
- the powers of the Chairman of the Joint Chiefs of Staff should be strengthened

On April 1, 1986, Reagan signed National Security Decision Directive 219. Although some recommendations required legislative action, others were executed solely by presidential authority. On May 5, 1986, the Goldwater–Nichols Act passed through the senate, reforming the Joint Chiefs of Staff and implementing those recommendations which required legislative action.

The FASA of 1994 and the Federal Acquisition Improvement Act of 1995 rewrote the government procurement regulations.

== See also ==
- Public administration
- Presidential commission (United States)
