= Richard P. Cooley =

American banker

President of Seafirst Bank
- In office 1983–1992

President of Wells Fargo Bank
- In office 1966–1978
- Preceded by: H. Stephen Chase
- Succeeded by: Carl E. Reichardt

Personal details
- Born: Richard Pierce Cooley; November 25, 1923; Dallas, Texas
- Died: September 21, 2016 (aged 92); Seattle, Washington
- Spouse(s): Sheila McDonnell Collins; Judith Chase Ludwig; Mary Alice Clark Cooley; Bridget McIntyre
- Children: 5
- Education: Portsmouth Priory
- Alma mater: Yale University

Richard Pierce Cooley (November 25, 1923 – September 21, 2016) was an American banking executive who served as president of Wells Fargo Bank and Seafirst Bank.

== Early life ==
Cooley was born in Dallas, Texas on November 25, 1923. He was a son of Victor Cooley and Helen (née Pierce) Cooley. He grew up in Rye, New York and had three younger sisters, Kay Cooley and Ann Cooley (who married James Buckley), and Helen Cooley Reilly.

He graduated from Portsmouth Priory in Rhode Island before attending Yale University. While at Yale, he volunteered for the U.S. Army and flew a P-38 fighter jet in the European theatre of World War II. In December 1944, while test flying a newly delivered P-38 in France, the dive flaps failed; he crashed, during which his right arm was severed. He returned to Yale where he graduated with the class of 1944.

== Career ==
After Yale, he worked for the McCall Corporation in New York City in their commercial printing department. In 1949, he moved to San Francisco and joined Wells Fargo. In 1967, he recruited Ernest C. Arbuckle, dean of the Stanford Graduate School of Business, to succeed Stephen Chase as board chairman. By 1968, he was promoted to president and chief executive in late 1966 at the age of 42. "The bank's loan portfolio and profits rose steadily during his tenure, as the bank expanded its reach to become a force in banking throughout California and other Western states." In 1978, he was named chairman and chief executive when he was succeeded as president by Carl E. Reichardt.

In 1982, he resigned from Wells Fargo and, the following year, was named chairman, chief executive, and president of the nearly bankrupt Seafirst Corporation in Seattle, Washington. At Seafirst, which had made several bad loans to oil industry projects that failed, Cooley orchestrated a merger with Bank of America. He remained at Seafirst until 1992, and then four more years as chairman of the bank's executive committee. After his retirement, he taught business classes at the University of Washington and Seattle University.

Cooley also served as a director of United Airlines for 25 years beginning in the early 1970s; Pacific Gas and Electric, Paccar, Egghead Software, and the Burlington Northern Railroad from 1989 to 1994. He also served as a trustee of California Institute of Technology and the board of the Kaiser Family Foundation from 1987 to 1994. He was a trustee for the RAND Corporation from 1971 to 1981 and again from 1982 to 1992. He was a chairman for the United Way in San Francisco and Seattle and served on the boards of the San Francisco Zoo, the Los Angeles County Museum, the Los Angeles Philharmonic, the Seattle Symphony Orchestra, the Seattle Art Museum, and Seattle Prep.

=== Memoir ===
In 2010, Dick published his memoir Searching Through My Prayer List. After his death, a revision of this book titled Level Best, was published in 2017.

== Personal life ==
Cooley was married four times. Sheila McDonnell Collins, Judith "Judy" Chase Ludwig (the daughter of his predecessor Wells Fargo president H. Stephen Chase), Mary Alice Clark Cooley and Bridget McIntyre. He was the father of:

- Leslie Cooley, who married Kristine Jensen.
- Richard Pierce Cooley Jr., who married Christie Lane.
- Sheila Cooley, who married Mark Fagan.
- Mark Cooley, who married Joan D'Ambrosio.
- Sean Murray Cooley (1961–2015), who married Dr. Jean Kayser.

Cooley was a member of the Augusta National Golf Club, Cypress Point Club, and the Seattle Golf Club.

He died on September 21, 2016, at his home in Seattle, Washington.

Business positions
Preceded by H. Stephen Chase	President of Wells Fargo; 1966–1978	Succeeded by Carl E. Reichardt
