= Ransom M. Cook =

American banker (1899–1986)

President of Wells Fargo Bank
- In office 1960–1964
- Preceded by: Isaias W. Hellman III
- Succeeded by: H. Stephen Chase

Personal details
- Born: Ransom McCurdy Cook; September 23, 1899 Portland, Oregon
- Died: February 14, 1986 (aged 86) Penngrove, California
- Spouse: Margaret Scheld (m. 1945; died 1961)
- Relations: Donald Cook (brother)
- Children: Ransom S. Cook
- Parent(s): Edith Parker Cook; Frank Ransom Cook
- Education: Jefferson High School
- Alma mater: Oregon State College

Ransom McCurdy Cook (September 23, 1899 – February 14, 1986) was an American banker who served as president of Wells Fargo Bank from 1960 to 1964.

== Early life ==
Cook was born and raised in Portland, Oregon on September 23, 1899.. His parents were Edith (née Parker) Cook (1863–1940) and Frank Ransom Cook (1867–1951), who was from Sandusky, Ohio, and later relocated to Hilo, Hawaii. His brothers were Mortimer Parker Cook and Donald Cook, a prominent stage and film actor, who was married to Princess Gioia Tasca di Cuto of Palermo from 1937 until his death in 1961.

After graduating in 1917 from Jefferson High School in Portland, he attended Oregon State College in Corvallis, Oregon, where he was a Sigma Nu affiliate.

== Career ==
In 1921, he joined the Mercantile Trust Company, becoming a vice president in 1926. The Mercantile Trust Company merged with the American Bank to form the American Trust Company of San Francisco. In 1934, Ransom, who was managing the Santa Rosa branch, became manager of the newly opened Sacramento branch of the firm.

In 1951, Cook became senior vice president of the American Trust followed by president of the firm in 1959, succeeding Harris C. Kirk who became chairman while remaining its chief executive officer. The following year, after the American Trust Company merged with Wells Fargo Bank to form Wells Fargo Bank American Trust Company, Cook was chosen to become president of the combined organization. Wells Fargo had been led by Isaias W. Hellman III (a grandson of banker Isaias W. Hellman, a founding father of the University of Southern California) since 1943 (when it was still known as Wells Fargo Bank & Union Trust Company). Two years after Cook assumed the presidency, the bank went back to being known as the Wells Fargo Bank. In 1964, Cook succeeded Hellman as chairman of the board while retaining the post of chief executive officer and was succeeded as president by H. Stephen Chase. In November 1966, Chase succeeded sixty-seven year-old Cook as chairman of the board, who was named chairman of the executive committee and continued to serve as president of the Wells Fargo Bank International Corporation. Cook retired as chairman of the executive committee of Wells Fargo on December 31, 1967, but remained on the board as well as chairman of Wells Fargo Bank International Corporation (where he was succeeded as president by Richard P. Cooley).

Cook also served as president of the California Bankers Association in 1958 and 1959, president of the Association of Reserve City Banks in 1961 and 1962 and a member of the advisory boards of the Export Import Bank and the Federal Reserve Board in Washington, D.C. He also served as chairman of Western American Bank, Ltd. (an international bank formed in London by Wells Fargo and three other banks) from 1968 to 1970 and a director of Euro Finance in Paris from 1966 to 1970.

In 1956, he became a director of Cutter Laboratories (which was purchased by Bayer pharmaceutical in 1974). He also served as a director of Pacific Gas and Electric Company, Littleton Industries, Farinon Electric Corporation (acquired by Harris Corporation in 1969), and Industrial Indemnity Company.

== Personal life ==
Cook was twice married. His first marriage was to Dorothy Edith Cook (1901–1991). His second marriage was in 1945 to Margaret (née Scheld) Wiggin, the only daughter of a pioneer California family who was educated at Miss Ransom School in Piedmont and in the East. Margaret, the former wife of Philip A. Wiggin, was the daughter of Adolph P. Scheld and the former Leila Carroll. Together, they lived at 2519 Broadway in the Pacific Heights neighborhood of San Francisco in a 1937 home designed by modernist architect Gardner Dailey. Cook was the father of:

- Ransom Stephen Cook (b. 1933), who graduated from Stanford University in 1955, Stanford Law School in 1959, becoming a lawyer based in San Francisco.

He was a member of the Pacific-Union Club and the Bohemian Club and presided over the board of trustees of Presbyterian Hospital and the Fine Arts Museums of San Francisco, where he was interested in Asian art.

Cook died on February 14, 1986, at his ranch at Penngrove near Santa Rosa, California. A memorial service was held for him at Grace Cathedral in San Francisco.

Business positions
Preceded by Isaias W. Hellman III	President of Wells Fargo; 1960–1964	Succeeded by H. Stephen Chase
