= History of Wells Fargo =

This article outlines the history of Wells Fargo & Company from its merger with Norwest Corporation and beyond. The new company chose to retain the name of "Wells Fargo" and so this article is about the history after the merger.

== Acquisitions in 1999–2000 ==
Continuing the Norwest tradition of making numerous smaller acquisitions each year, Wells Fargo acquired 13 companies during 1999 with total assets of $2.4 billion. The largest of these was the February purchase of Brownsville, Texas-based Mercantile Financial Enterprises, Inc., which had $779 million in assets. The acquisition pace picked up in 2000, with Wells Fargo expanding its retail banking into two more states: Michigan, through the buyout of Michigan Financial Corporation ($975 million in assets), and Alaska, through the purchase of National Bank of Alaska, with $3 billion of assets. Wells Fargo also acquired First Commerce Bancshares, Inc. of Lincoln, Nebraska, which had $2.9 billion in assets, and a Seattle-based regional brokerage firm, Ragen MacKenzie Group Incorporated. In October 2000, Wells Fargo made its largest deal since the Norwest-Wells Fargo merger when it paid nearly $3 billion in stock for First Security Corporation, a $23 billion bank holding company based in Salt Lake City, Utah, and operating in seven western states. Wells Fargo thereby became the largest banking franchise in terms of deposits in New Mexico, Nevada, Idaho, and Utah; as well as the largest banking franchise in the West overall. Following completion of the First Security acquisition, Wells Fargo had total assets of $263 billion with some 140,000 employees.

== 2000–present ==
In 2001, Wells Fargo acquired H.D. Vest Financial Services for $128 million, but sold it in 2015 for $580 million.

=== Acquisitions in 2007 and early 2008 ===
In January 2007, Wells Fargo acquired Placer Sierra Bank. In May 2007, Wells Fargo acquired Greater Bay Bancorp, which had $7.4 billion in assets, in a $1.5 billion transaction. In June 2007, Wells Fargo acquired CIT's construction unit. In January 2008, Wells Fargo acquired United Bancorporation of Wyoming. In August 2008, Wells Fargo acquired Century Bancshares of Texas.

=== Management changes (2007) ===
In June 2007, John Stumpf was named chief executive officer of the company, and Richard Kovacevich remained as chairman.

=== Acquisition of Wachovia (2008) ===
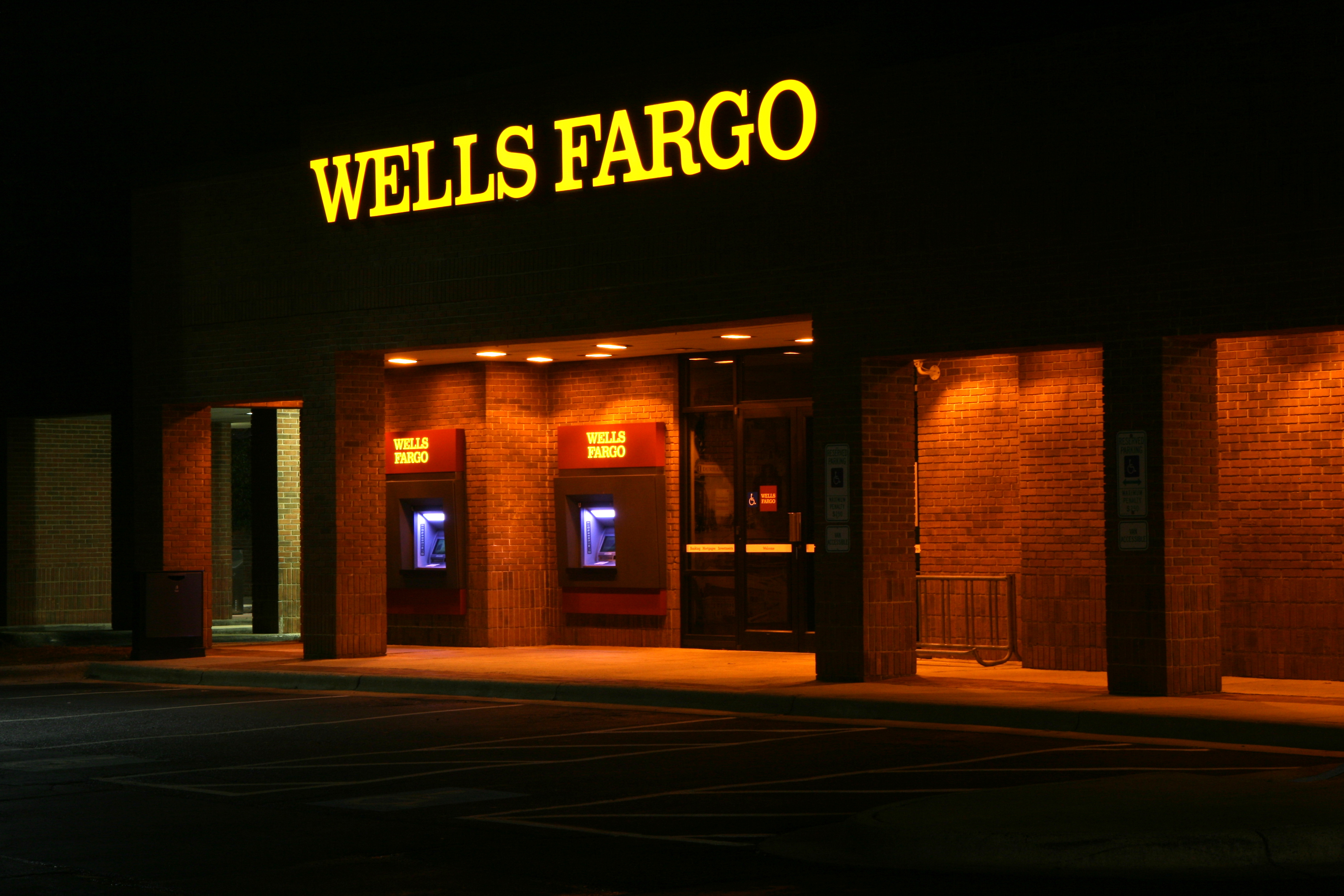
A former Wachovia branch converted to Wells Fargo in the fall of 2011 in Durham, North Carolina.

During the financial panic of September 2008, Wells Fargo made a bid to purchase the troubled Wachovia Corporation. Although at first inclined to accept a September 29 agreement brokered by the Federal Deposit Insurance Corporation to sell its banking operations to Citigroup for $2.2 billion, on October 3, Wachovia accepted Wells Fargo's offer to buy all of the financial institutions for $15.1 billion.

On October 4, 2008, a New York state judge issued a temporary injunction blocking the transaction from going forward while the situation was sorted out. Citigroup alleged that they had an exclusivity agreement with Wachovia that barred Wachovia from negotiating with other potential buyers. The injunction was overturned late in the evening on October 5, 2008, by New York state appeals court. Citigroup and Wells Fargo then entered into negotiations brokered by the FDIC to reach an amicable solution to the impasse. Those negotiations failed. Sources say that Citigroup was unwilling to take on more risk than the $42 billion that would have been the cap under the previous FDIC-backed deal (with the FDIC incurring all losses over $42 billion). Citigroup did not block the merger, but indicated they would seek damages of $60 billion for breach of an alleged exclusivity agreement with Wachovia.

The merger created a coast-to-coast super-bank with $1.4 trillion in assets and 48 million customers and expanded Wells Fargo's operations into nine Eastern and Southern states. There would be big overlaps in operations only in California and Texas, much less so in Nevada, Arizona, and Colorado. In contrast, the Citigroup deal would have resulted in a substantial overlap, since both banks' operations were heavily concentrated in the East and Southeast. The proposed merger was approved by the Federal Reserve as a $12.2 billion all-stock transaction on October 12 in an unusual Sunday order. The acquisition was completed on January 1, 2009.

=== Investment by U.S. Treasury during 2008 financial crisis ===
On October 28, 2008, Wells Fargo was the recipient of $25B of the Emergency Economic Stabilization Act Federal bail-out in the form of a preferred stock purchase. Tests by the Federal government revealed that Wells Fargo needed an additional $13.7 billion in order to remain well-capitalized if the economy were to deteriorate further under stress test scenarios. On May 11, 2009, Wells Fargo announced an additional stock offering, which was completed on May 13, 2009, raising $8.6 billion in capital. The remaining $4.9 billion in capital is planned to be raised through earnings. On December 23, 2009, Wells Fargo redeemed the $25 billion of series D preferred stock issued to the U.S. Treasury under the Troubled Asset Relief Program's Capital Purchase Program. As part of the redemption of the preferred stock, Wells Fargo also paid accrued dividends of $131.9 million, bringing the total dividends paid to the U.S. Treasury and U.S. taxpayers to $1.441 billion since the preferred stock was issued in October 2008.

=== Establishment of Wells Fargo Securities ===
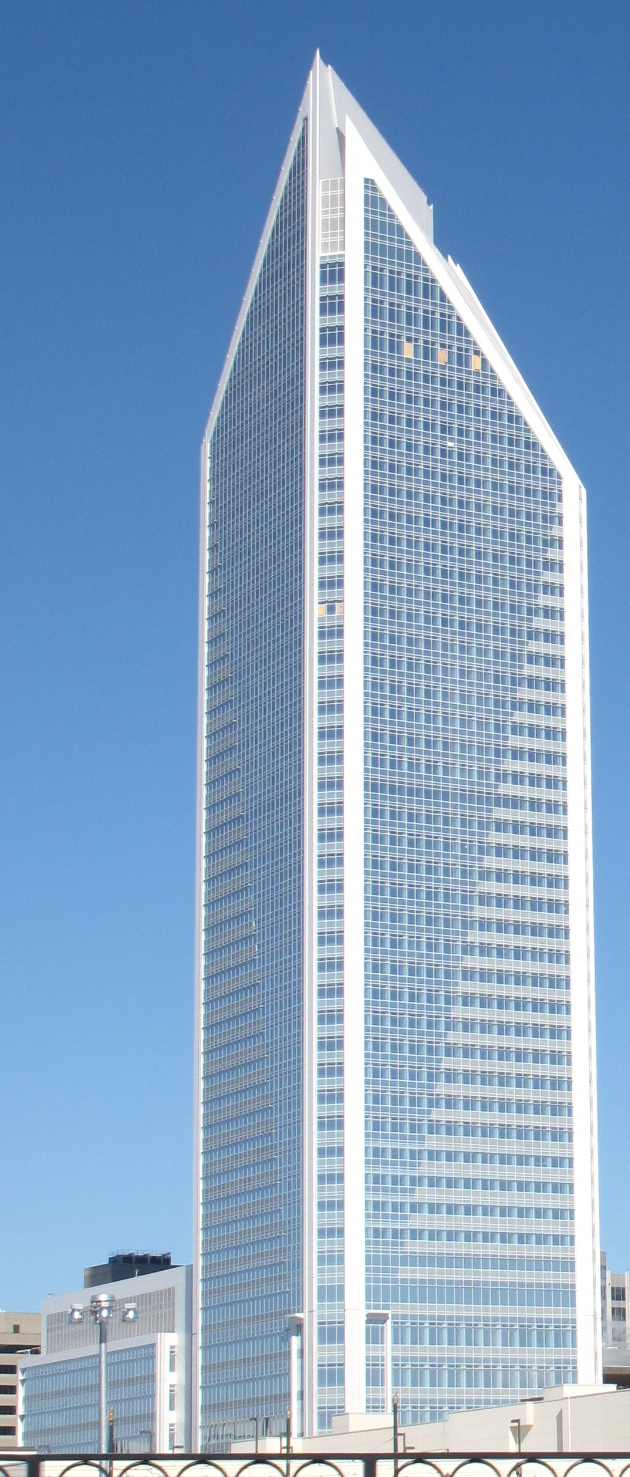
Duke Energy Center, home of WFS

Wells Fargo Securities was established in 2009 to house Wells Fargo's new capital markets group, which it obtained during the Wachovia acquisition. Prior to that point, Wells Fargo had little to no participation in investment banking activities, though Wachovia had a well-established investment banking practice which operated under the Wachovia Securities banner.

Wachovia's institutional capital markets and investment banking business arose from the merger of Wachovia and First Union. First Union had bought Bowles Hollowell Connor & Co. on April 30, 1998 adding to its merger and acquisition, high yield, leveraged finance, equity underwriting, private placement, loan syndication, risk management, and public finance capabilities.

Legacy components of Wells Fargo Securities include Wachovia Securities, Bowles Hollowell Connor & Co., Barrington Associates, Halsey, Stuart & Co., Leopold Cahn & Co., Bache & Co. and Prudential Securities, and the investment banking arm of Citadel LLC.

=== Wells Fargo cross-selling scandal ===
In 2016, the Wells Fargo cross-selling scandal led to the resignation of CEO John Stumpf and resulted in fines of $185 million by the Consumer Financial Protection Bureau.

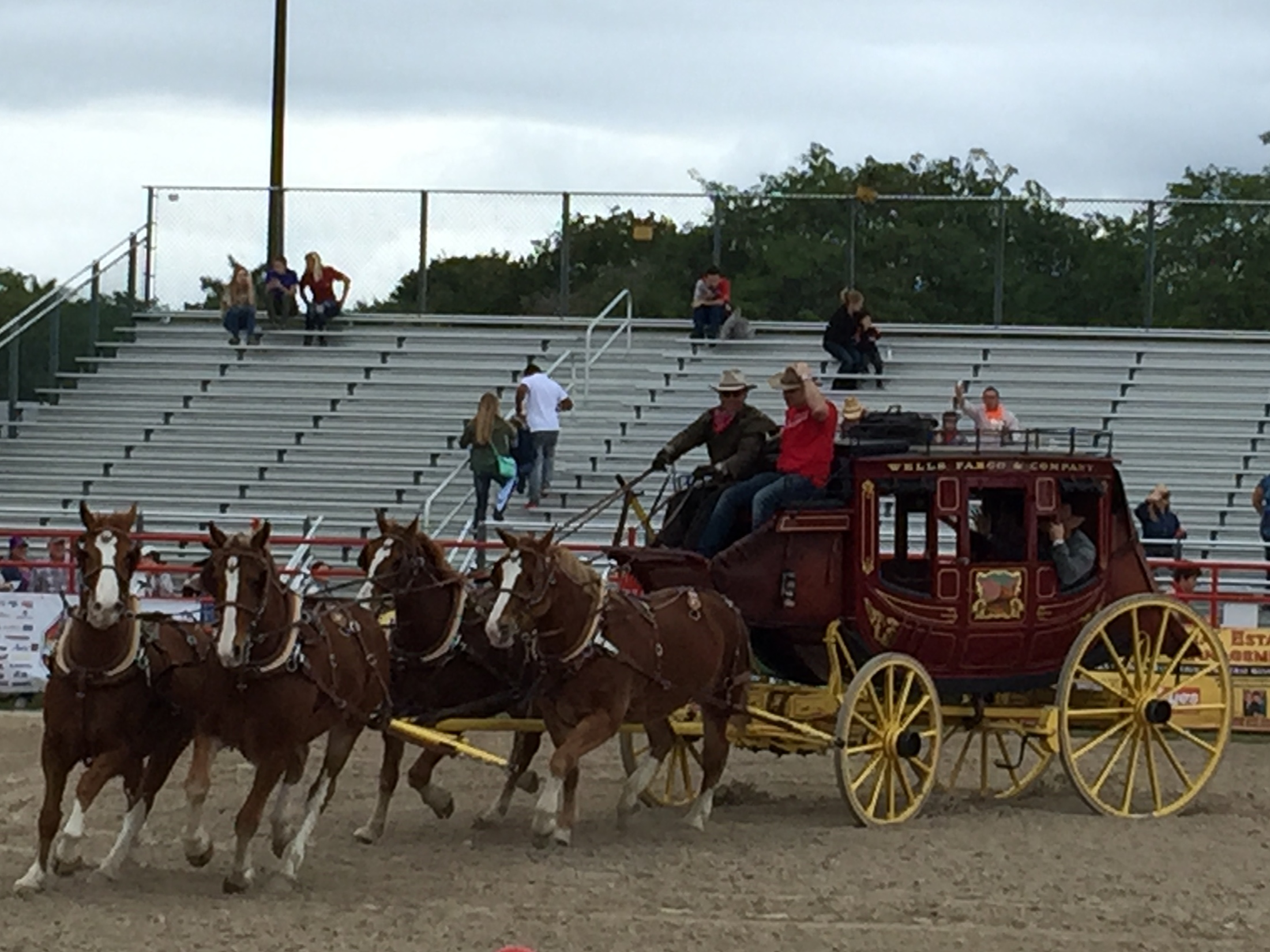
Wells Fargo horse carriage

=== Wells Fargo History Museum ===
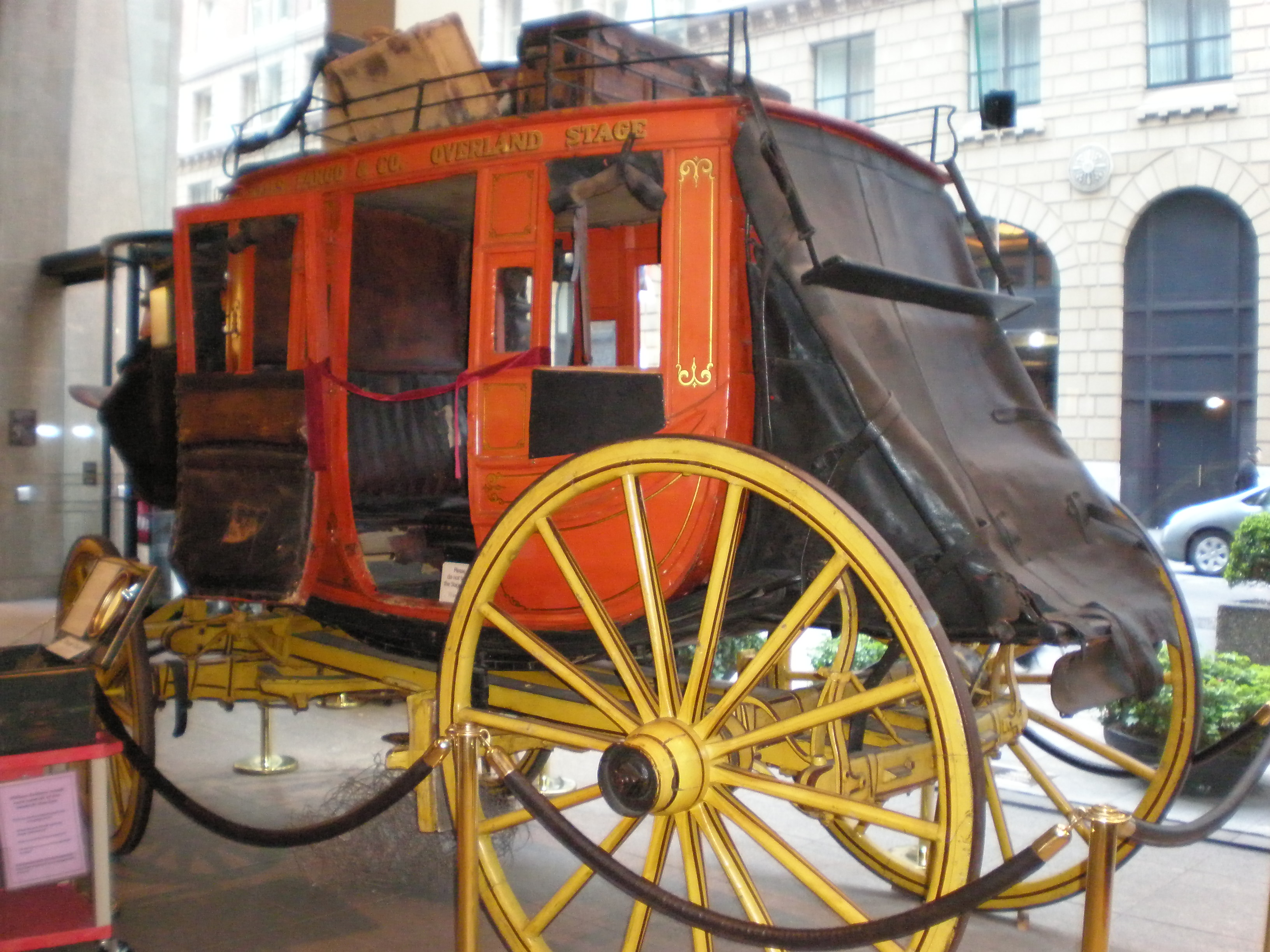
Concord stagecoach in Wells Fargo History Museum, San Francisco, CA

The company operates the Wells Fargo History Museum at 420 Montgomery Street, San Francisco. Displays include original stagecoaches, photographs, gold nuggets and mining artifacts, the Pony Express, telegraph equipment, and historic bank artifacts. The museum also has a gift shop. In January 2015, armed robbers in an SUV smashed through the museum's glass doors and stole gold nuggets. The company previously operated other museums but those have since closed.

== See also ==
- List of Wells Fargo directors
- List of Wells Fargo presidents

== Bibliography ==
- Anderson, Harold P. "The Corporate History Department: The Wells Fargo Model." The Public Historian 3.3 (1981): 25–29. JSTOR 3377729.
- Beebe, Lucius Morris, and Charles Clegg. US West, the saga of Wells Fargo (1949).
- Chandler, Robert J. "Integrity amid Tumult: Wells, Fargo & Co.'s Gold Rush Banking." California History 70#3 (1991): 258–277. doi:10.2307/25158569
- Fradkin, Philip L. Stagecoach: Wells Fargo and the American West (2002).
- Hungerford, Edward. Wells Fargo: advancing the American frontier (1949).
- Jackson, W. Turrentine. "Wells Fargo: Symbol of the Wild West?." Western Historical Quarterly 3#2 (1972): 179–196. JSTOR 967112.
- Jackson, W. Turrentine. "Wells Fargo Stagecoaching in Montana Trials and Triumphs." Montana: The Magazine of Western History 29#2 (1979): 38–53.
- Jackson, W. Turrentine. "A New Look at Wells Fargo, Stage-Coaches and the Pony Express." California Historical Society Quarterly 45#4 (1966): 291–324. in JSTOR
- Loomis, Noel M. Wells Fargo. New York: Clarkson N. Potter, Inc., 1968.
- Moody, Ralph. Stagecoach West. New York: Thomas Y. Crowell Company, 1967.
- Nevin, David. The Expressmen. New York: Time-Life Books, 1974.
