= Bowles Hollowell Conner & Co. =

American investment banking firm

- Company type: Acquired
- Industry: Investment bank
- Founded: 1975
- Fate: Acquired 1998 by First Union, later part of Wachovia
- Headquarters: Charlotte, North Carolina
- Products: Mergers and acquisitions, Private equity
- Total assets: $18 million

Bowles Hollowell Conner & Co. (BHC) was a leading middle market investment banking firm headquartered in Charlotte, North Carolina. The firm was founded in 1975 by Erskine Bowles and Thomas Hollowell.

In April 1998, Bowles Hollowell was acquired by First Union. The former Bowles Hollowell and would later constitute a significant portion of the investment banking operations of Wachovia after its acquisition of First Union. Bowles Hollowell had assets of $18 million as of January 1, 1998.

Bowles Hollowell was active in the private equity and leveraged buyouts. The firm had represented more than 75 different private equity firms in the mid-1990s and Bowles Hollowell actively covered more than 275 private equity firms across the United States. Additionally, Bowles Hollowell provided advisory services to middle market companies and large corporations. The firm had capabilities in a variety of industries including automotive, food products and distribution, building products, technology, textile, healthcare and aerospace & defense.
