= Lloyd Tevis =

American businessman (1824–1899)

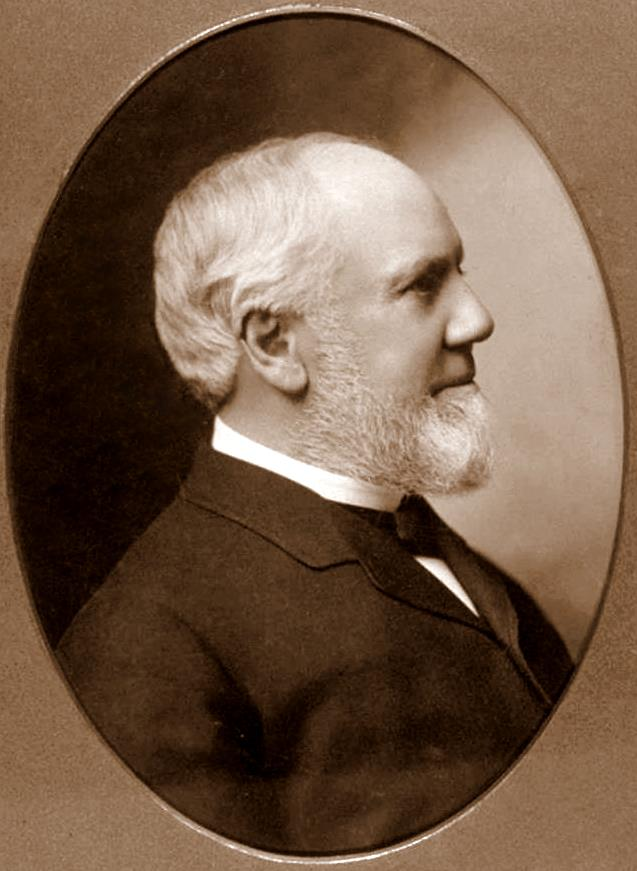

President of Wells Fargo & Company
- In office 1872–1892
- Preceded by: William Fargo
- Succeeded by: John J. Valentine Sr.

Personal details
- Born: March 20, 1824 Shelbyville, Kentucky
- Died: July 24, 1899 (aged 75) San Francisco, California
- Spouse: Susan G. Sanders (m. 1854)
- Children: 5
- Parent(s): Samuel Tevis; Sarah Greathouse Tevis

Lloyd Tevis (March 20, 1824 – July 24, 1899) was a banker and capitalist who served as president of Wells Fargo & Company from 1872 to 1892. He also co-founded the Pacific Coast Oil Company, the progenitor to Chevron Corporation.

== Early life ==
Lloyd Tevis was born in Shelbyville, Kentucky, the son of Samuel and Sarah (née Greathouse) Tevis. His father was a prominent attorney and circuit court clerk, and from 1842 to 1844 Lloyd studied law in his office and assisted him as court clerk. After a further period of study and work in a neighboring county, he became a salesman with a wholesale dry goods company in Louisville, Kentucky. He was highly regarded, and when the company failed he was appointed assignee.

On the basis of his performance in this position, Tevis was offered, and accepted, a place in the Bank of Kentucky in 1848. He left the bank shortly, however, to accept a position with an insurance company in St. Louis, Missouri.

== California ==
Tevis went to California to join the gold rush in the spring of 1849. Finding little success in the diggings, at the end of the year he went to Sacramento and secured a position in the county recorder's office. Saving money from his salary, after a few months he made his first investment in land, purchasing a lot for $250. In October 1850 he joined an acquaintance, James Ben Ali Haggin, in opening a law office in Sacramento. They moved to San Francisco in 1853. Haggin and Tevis acquired the Rancho Del Paso land grant near Sacramento.

Haggin and Tevis married sisters, daughters of Colonel Lewis Sanders, a Kentuckian who had emigrated to California. Tevis married Susan G. Sanders on April 20, 1854. The Tevises were the parents of three sons and two daughters. His daughter Louise married John Witherspoon Breckinridge, a son of former Vice President John C. Breckinridge, in 1877.

Tevis was one of the principal owners of the California Steam Navigation Company and one of the projectors of telegraph lines throughout California. In the negotiations for the sale of the California State Telegraph Company to the Western Union Telegraph Company, it is said that his profits and commissions amounted to $200,000. He was also the leading promoter of the California Dry Dock and the California Market in San Francisco, the president and principal owner of the Pacific Ice Company; and one of the early manufacturers of illuminating gas in California. At one time Tevis owned 1,300 miles of stagecoach lines in California, horse-drawn streetcar lines in San Francisco, and ranch lands with thousands of head of cattle and sheep. He was a pioneer in the reclamation of "tule" or swamp lands in central California.

== Wells Fargo and railroading ==
In the 1860s, Tevis was one of the men responsible for development of various railroads in and around San Francisco, including the San Francisco and San Jose Railroad, Oakland Short Lines, and the first iteration of the Southern Pacific Railroad. In 1868, he sold his railroad interests to the Central Pacific Railroad's "Big Four" of Collis P. Huntington, Leland Stanford, Mark Hopkins and Charles Crocker.

In May 1868 Tevis joined Darius Ogden Mills, H.D. Bacon, Stanford, Hopkins and Crocker (the latter three part of the Central Pacific "Big Four") in forming the Pacific Union Express Company. This concern began operating in 1868 between Reno and Virginia City, Nevada, and received a ten-year exclusive contract to operate over the Central Pacific and Union Pacific Railroads. Stock of Wells Fargo & Company declined in price, Tevis and his associates purchased quantities of it, and by the fall of 1869 he was in a position to control Wells Fargo. Faced with the need to get Tevis' exclusive railroad contract, in the so-called Omaha Conference of October 4, 1869, Wells Fargo accepted Tevis' controlling interest and arranged for the consolidation of Pacific Union Express and Wells Fargo, which occurred in 1870. Tevis was elected vice president and a director of Wells Fargo in 1870.

Elected president of Wells Fargo in 1872, Tevis served in that capacity until 1892. He was also a large shareholder of the Spring Valley Water Company, the Risdon Iron Works, the Occidental & Oriental Steamship Company, and the Sutro Tunnel Company of Virginia City. Tevis was also one of the promoters of the Southern Pacific Railroad, serving briefly as acting president of the company (in place of Stanford) in 1869–70 after its acquisition by the Big Four – Stanford, Hopkins, Crocker and Collis P. Huntington.

== Mining interests ==
A sound operator, Tevis made his most risky ventures when he went into gold, silver and copper mining on a large scale. He was owner or part-owner of gold and silver mines in California, Nevada, Utah, Idaho, and South Dakota. Tevis, Haggin and George Hearst, as Hearst, Haggin, Tevis and Co., owned the Homestake gold mine in the Black Hills and the Ontario silver mine in Utah, and Tevis, Haggin, Hearst and Marcus Daly owned the great Anaconda copper strike in Montana.

In 1896 the Hearst share of the Anaconda copper properties was sold to an English syndicate. In May 1899, Tevis, Haggin and Daly sold their shares to a syndicate led by Henry H. Rogers. For his share Tevis is said to have received $8 million.

== Later life ==
Tevis said he could think five times as fast as any man in San Francisco. Often he proved it. However, in later years it is said that he relaxed banking practices too much. John J. Valentine, Sr. and other Wells Fargo directors were critical of his administration following an extensive audit in 1891. On August 11, 1892, Tevis was forced out as president of Wells Fargo with Valentine elected his successor. Further pressure resulted in Tevis' resignation from the board of directors a year later, on August 10, 1893.

Two months after selling his interest in the Anaconda properties, Tevis died in San Francisco on July 24, 1899, survived by his wife and five children.

== Earthquake of 1906 ==
In the San Francisco earthquake and fire of April 18, 1906, Tevis' son, Dr. Harry Tevis, rescued the opera singers Emma Eames and Marcella Sembrich and brought them to the wooden Tevis mansion on Nob Hill. When it became obvious the next day that the house would be destroyed by the advancing fires, Tevis led them to the safety of North Beach.

== See also ==
- History of Wells Fargo

== Sources ==
- Dictionary of American Biography (Vol. VXIII ed.). New York: Charles Scribner's Sons. 1936. p. 384.
- Loomis, Noel M. (1968). Wells Fargo. C. N. Potter.
