= Dudley Evans (businessman) =

American businessman and politician (1838–1910)

President of the Wells Fargo & Company Express
- In office 1902–1910
- Preceded by: John J. Valentine, Sr.
- Succeeded by: William Sproule

Personal details
- Born: January 27, 1838 Morgantown, Virginia
- Died: March 27, 1910 (aged 72) Manhattan, New York
- Spouse: Nellie Seelye
- Children: 2
- Education: Washington College; Monongahela Academy

Military service
- Branch/service: Confederate Army
- Rank: Colonel
- Commands: 20th Virginia Cavalry

Colonel Dudley Evans (January 27, 1838 – March 27, 1910) was an American soldier, legislator and banking executive who served as president of Wells Fargo Co. from 1902 until his death in 1910.

== Early life ==
Evans was born in Morgantown, Virginia (today Morgantown, West Virginia) on January 27, 1838. He was descended from a family of Welsh immigrants that first settled Fairfax County, Virginia (near Mount Vernon) in 1683. Shortly before the American Revolution, his family "went over the mountains into that part of Virginia which split off in the civil war" into Monongahela in what became West Virginia.

At age fifteen, he entered Monongahela Academy and graduated from Washington College in 1859.

== Career ==
After graduating from Washington College, he became a teacher in Louisiana until the American Civil War broke out. Evans returned to Virginia, although his hometown had become part of the newly formed state of West Virginia (which was admitted to the Union), he enlisted in the 1st Virginia Infantry of the Confederate Army. He fought through the war, was made Captain after the Battle of Seven Pines in 1862, and after the campaign in the Valley of Virginia, he became a Colonel of the 20th Virginia Cavalry. Near the close of the war, he was captured and spent a long term in Federal prison. In addition to his military service, he was twice elected to the Virginia House of Delegates during the War.

=== Business career ===
After the war, Evans moved west to California. He served the company in Vancouver, British-Columbia and in Portland, Oregon, becoming Superintendent of the division which included the Northwestern states. In the late 1880s, his responsibilities were expanded and in 1892 he became manager of the company and was elected Second Vice President, serving in that role until 1902. After the death of John J. Valentine Sr. in December 1901, Evans served as acting president until he was formally elected to succeed Valentine as president of the Wells Fargo Express Company in October 1902. In addition to being president of the Express Company, he was president of the Wells Fargo Bank of New York, a director of Mercantile Trust Company, treasurer of the Batopilas Mining Company of Mexico, a director of the Citizens' National Bank of Englewood, New Jersey and the Wells Fargo Nevada National Bank of San Francisco.

A close friend of the railroad executive E. H. Harriman, Evans closely aligned Wells Fargo express lines with those of Harriman's Southern Pacific Railroad along the Pacific coast and in Mexico where Wells Fargo "took over the express business on all the railway lines in Mexico which are controlled by the Mexican Government." Harriman had a large influence over the financial policy of the company as one of its largest shareholders, and staunchly supported Evans during a 1906 stockholder fight over a more liberal distribution of earnings. After Harriman's death in 1909, however, the company increased its capital from $8,000,000 to $24,000,000 paying stockholders a 300% dividend.

== Personal life ==
Evans married Nellie Seelye of New Brunswick, Canada. Together, they were the parents of two children:

- Stanley Seelye Evans (b. 1886), who married Ellen Louise Cott (1892–1947), a daughter of Frank Alfred Edwards Cott of Englewood in 1916.
- Clarice Evans, who married Roger Dunscombe.

Evans died at Roosevelt Hospital in New York City on March 27, 1910. His widow died at the Hotel Monclair in New York in 1929.

=== Descendants ===
Through his son Stanley, he was a grandfather of Dudley Evans (1918–1993), a Princeton University graduate who married Carolyn Campbell Ingraham (a daughter of Paul Webb Ingraham) in 1945.

Business positions
Preceded by John J. Valentine, Sr.	President of Wells Fargo & Co. Express; 1902–1910	Succeeded by William Sproule
