= John J. Valentine Sr. =

American businessman (1840–1901)

John J. Valentine
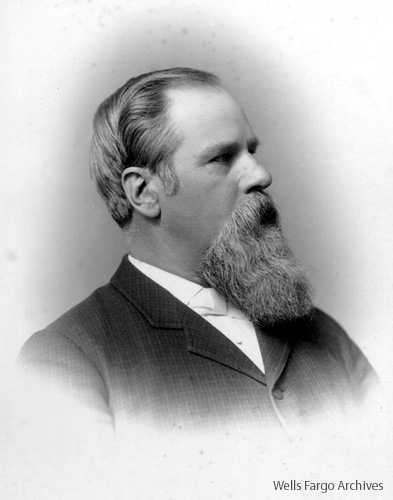

President of Wells, Fargo and Co.
- In office 1892–1901
- Preceded by: Lloyd Tevis
- Succeeded by: Dudley Evans

Personal details
- Born: John Joseph Valentine; November 12, 1840 Bowling Green, Kentucky
- Died: December 21, 1901 (aged 61) Oakland, California
- Resting place: Mountain View Cemetery, Oakland, California
- Spouses: Mary F. George (m. 1871; died 1885) Alice Maud Blanchard (m. 1888)
- Children: 9
- Parent(s): William Crenshaw Valentine; Eliza Cunningham Valentine

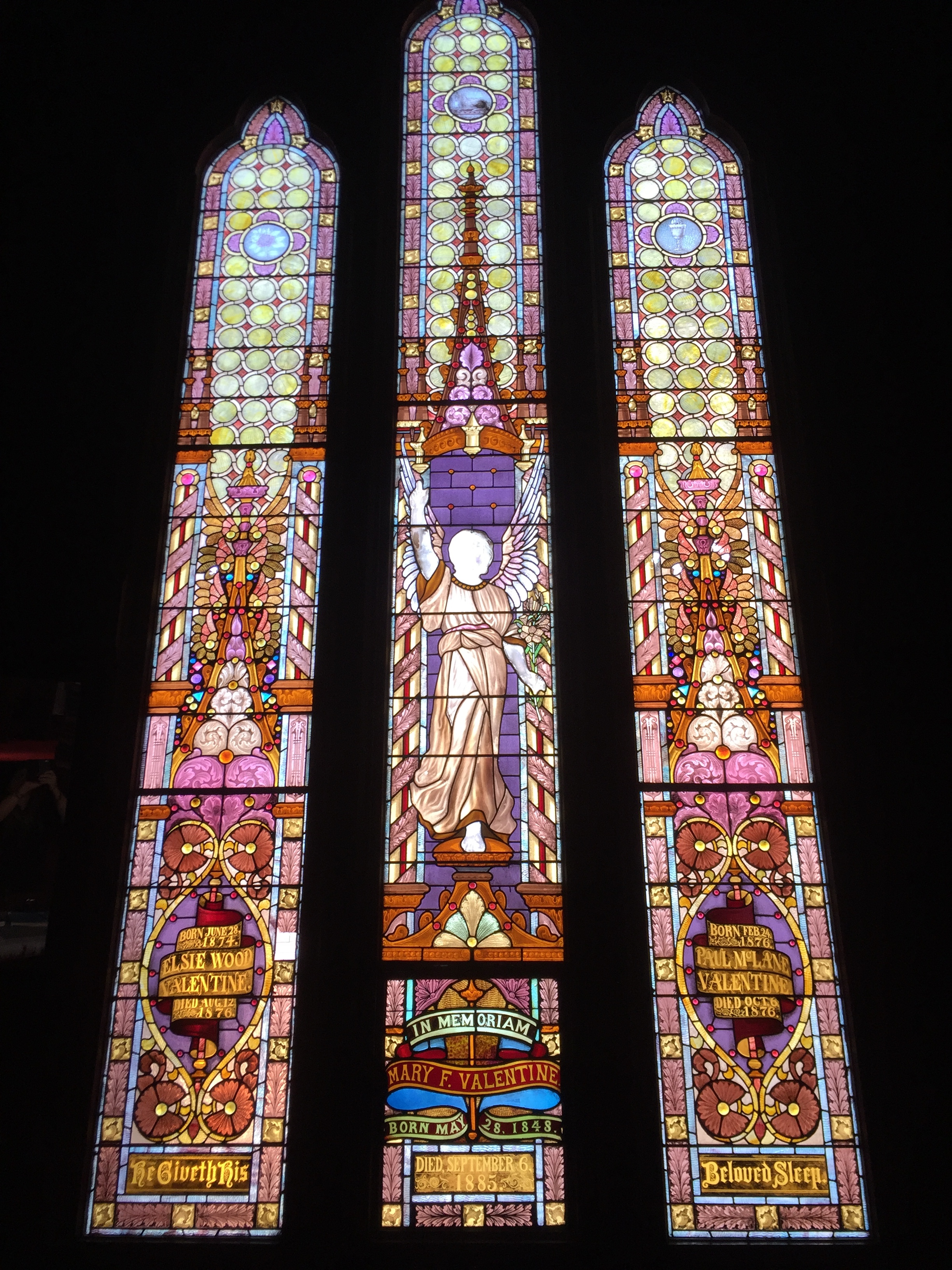
Memorial window at St. James Episcopal Church, Oakland CA depicting the names of Mary F. Valentine, children Elsie Wood Valentine, and Paul McLane Valentine. Window shows need of repair and updating due to seismic activity and age.

John Joseph Valentine Sr. (November 12, 1840 – December 21, 1901) was an American expressman. He was the first president of Wells Fargo & Company who had not been a banker and served from 1892 until his death in 1901.

== Early life ==
He was born in 1840 at Bowling Green, Kentucky, the son of William Crenshaw Valentine and Eliza Yates (née Cunningham) Valentine. His Valentine ancestors from Eccles, Lancaster, England, had settled in Virginia in the 17th century.

After attending the common schools, Valentine began his business career in 1854 working for Younglove Brothers, druggists and agents for Carter, Thomas & Company's express line in Bowling Green. Later he worked for O'Bannon, Kean & Company and then for the Adams Express Company until 1861.

== Wells Fargo career ==
In the spring of 1861 Valentine went to California, where he was joint agent for Wells Fargo & Company, the Pioneer Stage Company and the California State Telegraph Company at Strawberry Valley, California. Soon after, he was transferred to Virginia City, Nevada, as agent for Wells Fargo, the Pioneer Stage Line and John Butterfield's Overland Mail Company. Valentine was named superintendent of express for Wells Fargo's Pacific Division in November 1866.

On an inspection trip in a snowbound region in 1867, his horse threw him and he fell head first over a 50 feet (15 m) embankment.

He was very successful at negotiating contracts with competing express companies that enabled the company to expand its services across a wide area, even though they jealously served by a variety of railroads. In 1888, as general superintendent he successfully linked up a through express line from the Atlantic Ocean in New York City to the Pacific at San Francisco.

Valentine was appointed general superintendent at Wells Fargo's corporate headquarters in New York City in 1869. The headquarters was moved to San Francisco in 1870, whereupon he maintained his residence in Oakland until his death. He was a member of Advent Episcopal Church and vice president of YMCA of Oakland. He was appointed general superintendent of Wells Fargo's express department on February 8, 1872.

Upon the resignation of Charles F. Crocker in August 1882, Valentine was elected vice president and a director of Wells Fargo. He was also general manager of the company from the beginning of 1884.

His annually published summary of the American production of gold and silver was comprehensive in its research and recognized as authoritative on the subject. Opposed to the free coinage of silver as likely to cause a glut in the domestic market and depreciate its value, in 1891 Valentine's contributions to the press on the subject were notable for close reasoning, careful research, and a formidable array of statistics in support of his conclusions.

Valentine was critical of the relaxed banking practices uncovered during audits of Wells Fargo's branches in 1891. When Lloyd Tevis was ousted as president of Wells Fargo on August 11, 1892, Valentine was elected his successor. Although Valentine was a prime expressman, in the opinion of a later Wells Fargo Bank president, Frederick L. Lipman, he was the company's first president who was not a banker. Valentine wrote a number of pamphlets on financial subjects, notably, one titled Money that advocated a parity of value to be maintained between gold and silver.

After his death, Dudley Evans was elected to succeed him as president of Wells Fargo on January 2, 1902.

== Personal life ==
He was married to Mary George and they were the parents of John J. Valentine Jr., born in 1881. At the time of his death, Valentine was married to Alice Maud Blanchard Valentine, and they had seven children, four from John's first marriage.

Valentine died on December 21, 1901, in Oakland, California. At Valentine's funeral on December 23, 1901, Advent Episcopal Church "was filled to overflowing and a choir of nearly 50 took part...outside, the funeral procession included a large Wells Fargo express wagon draped with flowers. California Bishop Nichols spoke of Valentine as the 'honored and honest head' of a large corporation who was 'Christian in conviction, in conduct' and who had a 'warm heart for his fellow man.' Though this was the era of "robber barons," it was his delight to say that the profits were distributed to '20,000 persons scattered all over the country, and that many were widows and orphans. Valentine frequently became aware of local disasters at points throughout the nation where Wells Fargo maintained offices. So he often began campaigns for relief funds for the needy throughout the nation. John J. Valentine was reputed to be a compassionate gentleman, so honored at his funeral." Advent Episcopal Church became St. James the Apostle Episcopal Church, which is still located at the 12th Avenue address. The church contains a phenomenal glass window commemorating his wife Mary F. Valentine and two of their children who died at 2 1/2 years old and 10 months old.

=== Philanthropy ===
He was a member and Vestryman of Advent Episcopal Church of Oakland since at least 1885 (in the late 1920s the church's name was changed to St. James the Apostle Episcopal Church]), and Vice President of the San Francisco YMCA. After a new church built at 1540 12th Avenue in Oakland Valentine "challenged members parishioners to eliminate the debt. He offered to match the donations of others up to half the debt total. By that program his desire was achieve; the debt was wiped out."
