= Burns D. Caldwell =

American business executive (1858–1922)

Burns Durbin Caldwell (1858 – September 24, 1922) was president of the Wells Fargo Express Company and chairman of the board the American Railway Express Company.

== Early life ==
Caldwell was born in Placerville, California in about 1858. He was a son of Jean (née Roney) Caldwell (1827–1908).

== Career ==
He started his career as a clerk in the auditor's office of the Vandalia Railroad at Terre Haute, Indiana. After a few years, he rose to the chief clerkship of the passenger and ticket office of that road in St. Louis, Missouri, later holding the position in St. Louis with the Missouri Pacific and the St. Louis, Iron Mountain and Southern Railways. By 1888, he was assistant general passenger agent of that line. In 1892, he was chosen as chairman of the Western Passenger Association which was headquartered in Chicago, Illinois. In 1899, he left Western to become traffic manager at the Lackawanna Railroad, eventually becoming vice president in charge of traffic. In October 1911, he resigned from Lackawanna to become president of Wells Fargo & Co. In 1918, he formed the American Railway Express Company, becoming chairman of the board while George Chadbourne Taylor became president.

== Personal life ==
On December 3, 1884, Caldwell was married to Sarah Elizabeth Bowman (1860–1948), a daughter of Bishop Thomas Bowman of the Methodist Episcopal Church, who had served as Chaplain of the U.S. Senate during President Abraham Lincoln's administration. They lived at 99 High Street in Orange, New Jersey and did not have any children.

Caldwell died on September 24, 1922, in a stateroom aboard a Pullman train just before he reached Burlington, Vermont while he was on his way home from a fishing trip in Canada.
