= Ernest C. Arbuckle =

Ernest C. Arbuckle (September 5, 1912 – January 17, 1986) was a business leader who was dean of the Stanford Graduate School of Business from 1958 to 1968.

== Biography ==
Arbuckle attended Stanford University, earning a B.A. in History in 1933. Arbuckle then spent a year at Stanford Law School, before enrolling in the Stanford Graduate School of Business and receiving his M.B.A. in 1936. After a year of travel, Arbuckle took a job with Standard Oil in San Francisco. With the outbreak of World War II, he enrolled in the United States Navy. He eventually attained the rank of lieutenant commander; he commanded a motor torpedo boat squadron off the coast of Italy, and in the process earned himself a Silver Star and a Purple Heart. He married Katherine Norris Hall in 1943; together, they had four children: Ernest C., Joan, Katherine and Susan. After the war, Arbuckle joined W. R. Grace and Company as an executive.

In 1958, Arbuckle was asked to become dean of the Stanford Graduate School of Business. He held this post for ten years, finally leaving in 1968. During his time as dean, the Stanford Graduate School of Business rose to prominence as one of the best business schools in the United States. In 1968, the Ernest C. Arbuckle Award was created to award the graduate of the Stanford Graduate School of Business who had demonstrated excellence in the field of leadership management. From 1968 to 1977, Arbuckle was the chairman of Wells Fargo; in 1978, he became the chairman of Saga Corporation.

In 1982, an endowed chair, named the Ernest C. Arbuckle Professor of Marketing and Management Science, was created at the Stanford Graduate School of Business in Arbuckle's honor. In 1985, at the request of President of the United States Ronald Reagan, Arbuckle served as a member of The Packard Commission. Arbuckle and his wife Katherine were killed in a car crash on January 17, 1986.
