= Carl E. Reichardt =

American business executive (1931–2017)

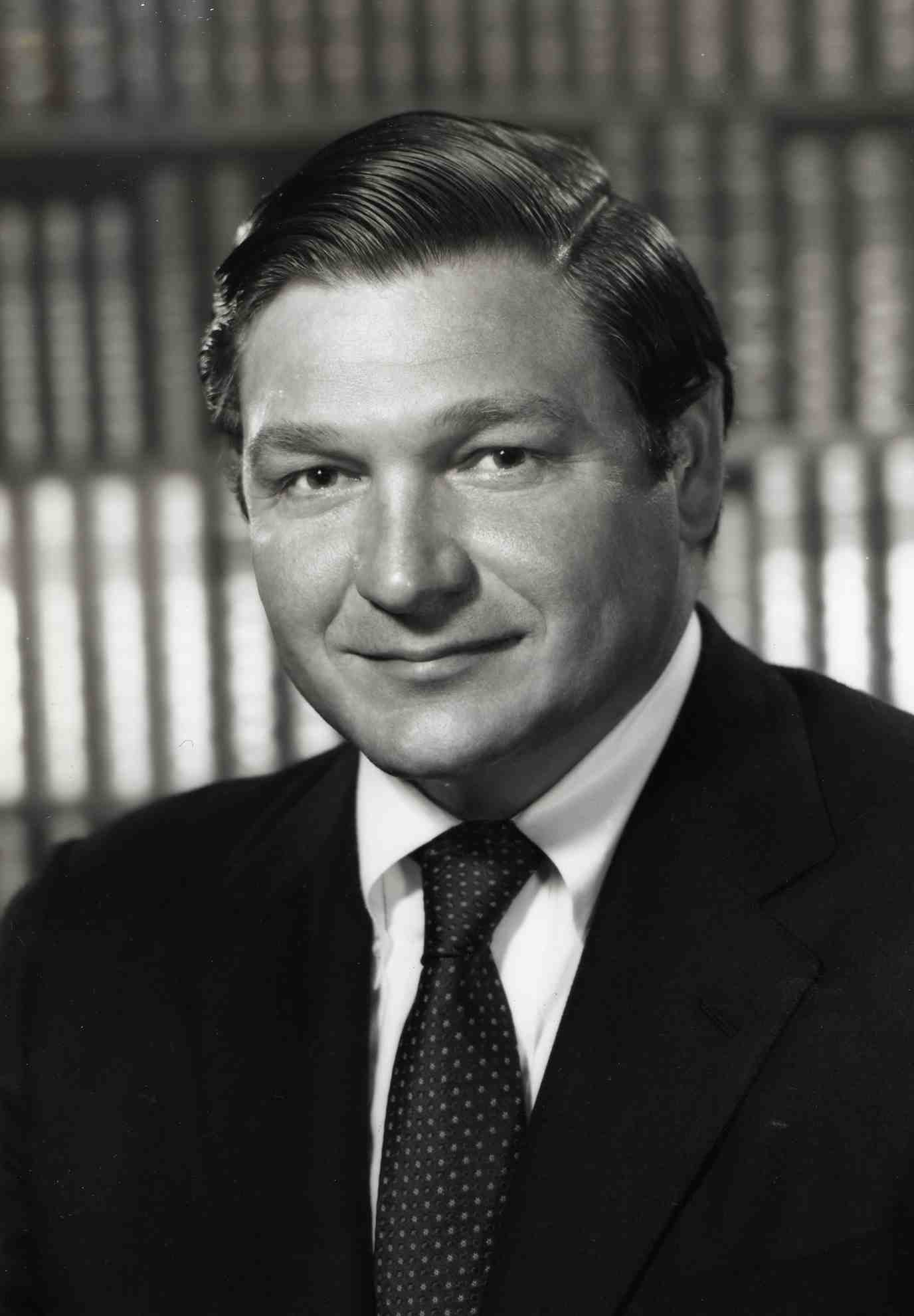
- Born: Carl Edwin Reichardt Jr. July 6, 1931; Houston, Texas, U.S.
- Died: July 13, 2017 (aged 86); Belvedere, California, U.S.
- Education: University of Southern California
- Occupation: Banking executive
- Known for: President of Wells Fargo & Company from 1978 to 1983

Carl Edwin Reichardt Jr. (July 6, 1931 – July 13, 2017) was an American banking executive and chief executive officer of Wells Fargo Bank.

== Early years ==
Reichardt received his BA degree in economics from the University of Southern California in 1956. Reichardt spent his formative years in banking in the 1960s in Los Angeles at Union Bank under the leadership of then-CEO and banking pioneer Harry Volk.

== Wells Fargo ==
In his banking career he joined Wells Fargo in 1970, rising to the post of president in 1978.

He was president of Wells Fargo & Company from 1978 to 1983 and then chief executive officer and chairman of the board of directors until the end of 1994. He was also named chief operating officer in 1981.

In January 1983 he succeeded Richard P. Cooley as chairman and chief executive officer of Wells Fargo. Reichardt relinquished the office of president to Paul Hazen in 1994. Together they guided the bank through the mergers with Crocker National Corporation in 1986 and Barclays Bank of California in 1988 and the recession of the early 1990s. In 1998, Reichardt retired from the board of directors of Wells Fargo.

== Other corporate involvement ==
He was a director of Ford Motor Company from 1986 to 2006, serving as vice chairman from 2001 to 2003.

Reichardt also served on the boards of a number of corporations, include Pacific Gas & Electric, ConAgra, HCA, McKesson, HSBC Holdings PLC, and the Newhall Management Corporation. In addition, he has served as a director of University of San Francisco and of the University of Southern California. In 1989, Reichardt received the Golden Plate Award of the American Academy of Achievement.

Reichardt died on July 13, 2017, at the age of 86.
