= William Sproule =

American businessman (1858–1935)

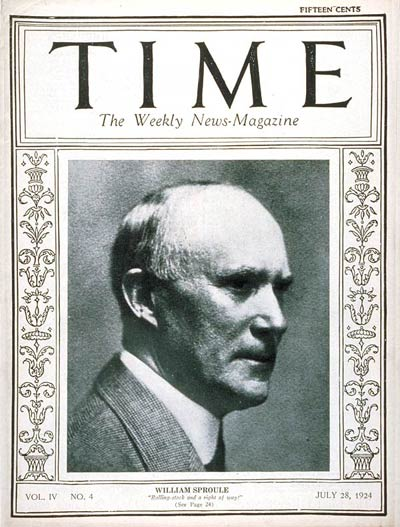
Time cover, 28 Jul 1924

William Sproule (1858 – January 1, 1935) was president of the Wells Fargo Express Company and later the Southern Pacific Railroad.
