= Joseph Francis Sartori =

American businessman

- Born: December 25, 1858; Cedar Falls, Iowa, US
- Died: October 6, 1946 (aged 87); Los Angeles, California, US
- Education: University of Michigan
- Known for: Security-First National Bank (Security Pacific Bank), Los Angeles Country Club, California Community Foundation
- Spouse: Margaret Lambert (Rishel) Sartori (1865-1937)
- Children: Juliette Boileau (Sartori) Wallace (1892-1964)

Joseph Francis Sartori (December 25, 1858 – October 6, 1946) was a Los Angeles banker and civic leader, founder and President of Security-First National Bank, was one of the founders of the Los Angeles Country Club and the City of Torrance, and was influential in the development of the Los Angeles Biltmore Hotel, Subway Terminal Building and Los Angeles Civic Center.

== Early life ==
Sartori was born December 25, 1858, in Cedar Falls, Iowa. His father, Joseph Sartori, migrated from Germany in the early 1850s. Though his family had lived in Germany for many generations, their origins were Italian. After five years as a bricklayer and plasterer in the United States, Joseph sent for his sweetheart, Theresa Wangler, the daughter of the burgomeister of Baden-Baden, Germany, and they were married in New Jersey.

Sartori showed his enterprising nature early in life. At the age of eleven or twelve, young Joseph began working on the railroad as "train butcher", selling newspapers, candy and other notions. When other men were happy to earn $30 per month, Sartori was earning $100.

== Education ==
In 1874, at the age of 15 he entered Cornell College in Mt. Vernon, Iowa.

He was very impressed by the Navy and wanted to join. But his parents did not want him to enlist and, after some negotiations, they told him he could go to any school in the world. And so, at the age of seventeen, he interrupted his schooling at Cornell and went to Germany where he entered the University of Freiburg. Here, among other pursuits, he developed a deep love of music. He also joined the dueling club, but at this, his parents, alarmed, insisted he return home, where he re-entered Cornell.

Sartori was athletic, and especially loved baseball. This love, along with his ability and aggressiveness, made him a natural leader. When at first he was not allowed to join the baseball team, he created a competing team that challenged and beat the existing college team. He was known as an outstanding shortstop.

He excelled at Cornell, earning high grades, running the baseball team, competing in swimming championships, starting a new college newspaper and organizing dances, musical programs and social outings.

Because of his short stature, he "resolved to become so big that men would have to look up to me." He was young and ambitious and liked to do things where he could use his brains. He believed in hard work, industry and patience, and was a firm believer in progress.

He graduated in 1879 and came home for the summer. He decided to become a lawyer, so in the fall he enrolled at the University of Michigan Law School. There he learned shorthand so he could take down the lectures in full. Still, even with a full academic load, he managed to play on the ball team and attend dances.

== Early career ==
After graduation in 1881 he went to work for the legal firm of Conner and Shaw in Denison, Iowa, mainly working with land titles. Leslie M. Shaw would later become Secretary of the Treasury during the administration of Theodore Roosevelt, and he asked Sartori to become Assistant Secretary of the Treasury, a post that young Sartori declined.

Sartori then moved to Le Mars, Iowa and partnered with lawyer Isaac S. Struble. At some point he realized he would not make a great trial lawyer. Through his work, he began to study buying and selling land in Northern Iowa and Southwestern Minnesota.

Struble, meanwhile, was elected to Congress, and Sartori then worked for lawyer Peter S. Rishel, a new arrival in Le Mars. Rishel was more artist than businessman, and Sartori offered to manage the business end of the practice, which prospered.

Sartori and Rishel joined Struble, forming Struble, Rishel and Sartori. It was at this time that Joseph met Margaret Rishel, his partner's daughter. They married on July 3, 1885, and went on an eighteen-month honeymoon. Though they visited Los Angeles in 1886, they thought that Kansas City, Missouri offered the best opportunities for their future. Sartori took an option on offices over Kansas City's First National Bank, and since the offices weren't to be available for a while, they returned to Le Mars.

Then Sartori got a telegram about the land boom in Southern California.

== Move to Los Angeles ==
On March 4, 1887, Sartori arrived in Los Angeles and traveled to Monrovia, California in the San Gabriel Valley, where the climate and country had impressed him on his last visit. But this time there was a new atmosphere of excitement and activity, and he thought he would check out the situation. He visited the Daugherty Ranch, 56 acres just east of Azusa, California, and took on option on the ranch for $150 on a Friday. On the following Monday Sartori took the train back to Los Angeles. A man named James Ganlon approached him, asking if he was the fellow who owned the option on the Daugherty Ranch, and purchased it for $8,500. Sartori was convinced he'd come to the right place.

He partnered with John F. Brossart and John Wilde, two old friends from Le Mars, Iowa, and laid out subdivisions in the Monrovia area, buying and selling lots. In one, the Pacific View Tract, he built his first home.

In Le Mars, Sartori had been a director and member of the loan committee of the Plymouth County Savings Bank and Trust Company. Since banking seemed more to his liking than real estate, he called on friends Brossart and Wilde, who, along with John H. Bartle, F.N. Meyers, and others, formed the First National Bank of Monrovia. A national charter for the bank was secured after he sent a telegram to his former partner Isaac S. Struble in Washington, D.C., who helped arrange for permission. In the beginning, Sartori became the bank's Cashier, while Brossart became President and Perkins was made Vice President. Later, Isaias W. Hellman became the bank's president, while Wilde was Vice President and Sartori remained Cashier. Hellman would become an important influence in Sartori's future efforts.

The bank opened July 2, 1887. Sartori would later become Vice President, a post he would hold until 1924, when the bank was acquired by Sartori's Security Trust and Savings.

In the summer of 1887, Monrovia decided to incorporate. The first election was held in December and Sartori was elected Treasurer, his first and only public office.

In early 1888, real estate sales in Los Angeles began to wane and soon the boom was over. First National weathered the subsequent depression, but Sartori saw that opportunities in Los Angeles would be greater than those in Monrovia.

== Security Savings Bank and Trust Company ==
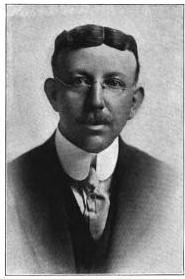
Maurice S. Hellman

Sartori moved to Los Angeles, and by the end of 1888, he and a group of associates started Los Angeles Loan and Trust, then expanded that organization into the Security Savings Bank and Trust Company. The board first met on January 19, 1889, and elected F.N. Meyers, President, S.A. Fleming, Vice President and Sartori, Cashier. A number of other local bankers connected with the Farmers and Merchants Bank were involved in its founding. Isaias W. Hellman, Jackson Graves, Herman W. Hellman, and Ozro W. Childs were among the stockholders and served on the board of directors. Capitalized at $200,000, the bank opened its doors on February 11, 1889, in the Weil Building at 148 South Main Street.

While the national Panic of 1893 resulted in runs on some Los Angeles banks, because Security was a savings bank it could legally require six months' notice of the intention to withdraw any term deposits. Once depositors saw that the bank would not be subject to a run on its funds, the bank withstood the crisis.

But a disagreement was developing between Sartori and F.N. Meyers, who thought the bank was too conservatively managed. In January, 1894, in a proxy battle, Meyers gained control, formed own board and changed management, leaving Sartori and his friends out.

During the year he was no longer a part of the bank, Sartori formed a partnership with Maurice S. Hellman, with offices located in the Bradbury Building, to deal in municipal bonds and other securities. In this he was supported by Isaias W. Hellman, Herman W. Hellman, Henry O'Melveney and Jackson Graves. In the January 1895 meeting, through the purchase of Myers' nephews stock, Sartori and his friends were able to take back control of the firm. Sartori was elected president; Maurice S. Hellman became an active vice president, and Willis D. Longyear was made cashier and secretary.

It was the beginning of a new era for the bank. Sartori met the new opportunity with renewed sense of optimism - a belief in California and especially in Southern California.

== Los Angeles Country Club ==
Sartori became interested in golf when, out bicycling one day with a friend, golfer Ed Tufts invited the pair to try the game at a local course. He was immediately hooked.

A group in the West Adams district had organized "The Los Angeles Golf Club", rented 16 acres at Pico and Alvarado and built a 9-hole golf course, the Windmill Links, so-called because an old windmill served as the clubhouse. In September, 1898, the club decided to incorporate, filing papers on October 3, 1898, as the Los Angeles Country Club. At the time, Sartori was considered one of the best five players in the club.

As other communities began to form golf clubs, a group of these communities formed the California Golf Club Association on July 29, 1899. Sartori would be President of the Association from 1903 to 1905.

Late in 1899, realizing that the club needed a larger course, Sartori and other members organized the County Club Land Association and purchased a 107-acre tract from the Cottle Brothers for $25,000 at Pico and Western. Sartori himself planned the new 18-hole course, which opened November 4, 1899.

But even this course proved to be unsatisfactory, so Sartori and Tufts looked for a better location. They looked at 320 acres of the Wolfskill Ranch nearer to Santa Monica, California. On December 25, 1904, Sartori proposed a plan to purchase the property and hold it for the club. The $48,000 cost was soon subscribed. In October 1905, the Realty Company, the organization formed to purchase and hold the land, proposed to sell the club 145 acres for $22,300 and to use the balance of the property to finance the course and the clubhouse. The clubhouse, designed by Hunt, Eager and Burns, opened May 30, 1911. Sartori was elected president, and was continually re-elected until his death in 1946.

== Growth of the bank ==
In 1896 the name of the bank was changed to Security Savings Bank and it moved to Main and Second Streets. But, as the center of business activity moved, the bank moved. So it was, in 1904, that the bank again moved, this time to a new building, erected by Herman W. Hellman, at 4th and Spring Streets. In 1904, the bank purchased Thomas L. Duque's Main Street Savings Bank. In 1905, it merged with the Los Angeles Savings Bank, and by the end of 1905, its deposits passed $12 million.

In December 1907, the bank consolidated with the California Savings Bank, and then, on December 14, 1907, it moved into the new Security Building at 5th and Spring Streets.

== Other fields ==
Sartori was involved in Los Angeles' early oil and gas industries. In May 1895, the Central Oil Company showed Sartori on the Board of Directors. It was a part of Sartori's nature was to try to bring order out of chaos, and it was this that led him to call a meeting of 15 smaller oil companies in San Francisco, a meeting that resulted in the creation of the Associated Oil Company, one of the major oil companies in the state.

Thaddeus S. C. Lowe had been active in the natural gas field, but could not meet all the demand. In response to the failure of private enterprise to meet demand adequately, John Randolph Haynes, Sartori and others organized the Los Angeles City Gas Company as competition, to eventually be sold to Los Angeles as a municipal system. This ultimately did not happen as planned, and in September 1908, the City Gas Company was purchased by the Domestic Gas Company, whose President was William G. Kerckhoff. This company would be taken over two years later by the newly formed Southern California Gas Company. Sartori also owned stock in the San Joaquin Light and Power Company, and eventually sold a controlling interest to Kerckhoff.

Sartori continued to be interested in investing in land. He was one of many investors in the George K. Porter Ranch in October, 1903, along with E.H. Harriman, Henry E. Huntington, William G. Kerckhoff, General Harrison Gray Otis, Edwin T. Earl, George C. Hunt and A. B. Hammond. The ranch sale, 16,450 acres for a total of $575,750, or $35 an acre, was brokered by Leslie C. Brand, and comprised the middle third of the northern half of the San Fernando Valley. Negotiations had been ongoing since the spring of 1901. This land deal would later be controversial, as the terminus of the Owens Valley aqueduct would be located near the Porter ranch lands, making them more valuable, and there was a suggestion that General Moses Sherman, a member of the Board of Water Commissioners, had advance knowledge of the project, which he may have passed on to some of the men who were part of the syndicate.

== California Bank Act of 1909 ==
The Panic of 1907 led the state of California to appoint a commission to draft a banking act. The California Bankers Association appointed a legislative committee to work with the commission; Sartori was a member of the committee. He made substantial contributions to the efforts of the Commission, drawing from in-depth research into the banking laws of other states, and adding his own ideas. One of his chief concerns was in protecting the depositor. He was especially against banks selling bonds, after seeing the dismal results of irrigation district bonds. The Act was adopted in 1910.

From 1909 to 1929, Sartori was either the Chairman or the Vice Chairman of the Legislative Committee of the California Bankers Association. He also took an active interest in the establishment of the Federal Reserve System, serving at one point as a director. He served on the Currency Commission of the American Bankers Association from 1912 to 1918.

Security was reorganized to operate in the three banking areas spelled out in the act: Savings, Commercial and Trust. The act allowed branch banking, and Security established its first branch in 1912 when it took on the Equitable Savings Bank, and retrained it as its Equitable Branch.

In 1912, after the bank acquired the Southern Trust Company of Los Angeles, Sartori changed the name of the bank to Security Trust and Savings Bank. He engaged lawyer and former state senator Louis Roseberry to head the new Trust Department.

== Branch banking ==
After World War I, the bank slowly began to consider branch banking. In 1919 the bank acquired Hollywood National Bank and Citizens Savings Bank of Hollywood. It operated both as the Hollywood Branch. In 1920, it opened a third branch at Seventh and Grand.

By the end of 1920, now a $100 million bank, Security engaged with 30 other banks to more thoroughly study branch banking.

After their report was received, the banks began expanding. Sartori, always careful, expanded cautiously. Acquisitions included seven in 1922; eleven in 1923 and thirteen in 1924, including his old firm, the First National Bank of Monrovia.

The growth of many communities that Security served allowed the firm to build larger buildings for its larger branches: the Hollywood Security Building in 1922, the Glendale Security Building in 1924, and the Long Beach Security Building in 1925.

While Security expanded its branch organization, Amadeo Giannini's Bank of Italy, already a major force in Northern California, sought to expand his firm's presence in Southern California. He wanted to name his branch organization Security Bank and Trust Company. Sartori felt this was sufficiently close to Security's name to cause confusion in the minds of consumers. Sartori took Giannini to court and prevailed, but the Bank of Italy chief did not give up easily and continued litigation. The controversy ended when, after a series of new acquisitions, Giannini decided to name his entire organization The Bank of America.

== Merger with First National Bank of Los Angeles ==
As part of the fallout from the Julian Petroleum Corporation Stock scandal, the First National Bank was significantly weakened. A merger was proposed, but Sartori insisted that any employee that had any association with the Julian deals had to resign. They did so, and on April 1, 1929, Security merged with the Los Angeles-First National Trust and Savings Bank, creating the 8th largest bank in the United States, Security-First National Bank of Los Angeles.

In 1934, 75-year-old Sartori retired as President, and became Chairman of the managing committee, while George M. Wallace became President.

== Civic activities ==
In 1907 the trustees of the overcrowded State Normal School were authorized to sell the site at Fifth and Grand. Sartori organized a group called the Normal Site Company to purchase a site and convey it to the city of Los Angeles. They held it for 6 years and then sold it to the city in 1913. It enabled Fifth Street to be cut through and was used for the Library site.

After Westwood was selected as the site for the new campus of the University of California, Sartori accepted the responsibility for raising the $1.4 million purchase price.

When Teresa Sartori, Joseph's mother, died of cancer in 1901, Joseph and his father established a hospital in Cedar Falls, Iowa in her memory, Sartori Memorial Hospital.

Sartori was instrumental in the development of the industrial community of Torrance, California. The Dominguez Land Company was created in 1911 under the leadership of Jared Sidney Torrance, who was company president. Torrance and Sartori had been colleagues in the Normal Site Company in 1907. In 1911, they purchased 2,792 acres of land from the Dominguez Estate Company and 730 acres from the Del Amo Estate Company which was subdivided and sold off, eventually forming the city of Torrance, CA. Sartori Avenue in old downtown Torrance paralleled the Pacific Electric Railway's tracks to its massive Torrance Shop complex.

Sartori established the California Community Foundation in 1915 in response to the first such foundation, formed in the city of Cleveland. The idea was that a bank in the community would serve as trustee for donated funds, the annual income of which could be distributed according to the benefactor's wishes. The bank invested the money, and an advisory committee separate from the bank was charged with distributing the funds.

After World War I, as people poured into Southern California and a new wave of speculation in real estate and stocks began, Sartori, remembering the fallout from the 1887 boom, was critical of these Roaring '20s. But he was a believer in Southern California and in progress, and helped in its development in many ways.

Sartori was key to the development of the Millennium Biltmore Hotel. In April 1921, Sartori called a meeting of forty prominent business and financial leaders to develop a great hotel for the great city of Los Angeles. This included Harry Chandler, Arthur Letts, Cecil B. De Mille, Henry M. Robinson, Moses Sherman, Marco Hellman, Ben R. Meyer, Andrew M. Chaffey, Charles H. Toll, and George I. Cochran. Their major objective was to see that Los Angeles was on the cutting edge of the American Experience. The group voted to acquire land at the southwest corner of Fifth and Olive Streets, which would be near the railway terminals and on main traffic avenues. They agreed that none of group should profit from the transaction. On October 6, they formed the Central Investment Corporation, and elected financier Lee A. Phillips as president.

John McEntee Bowman was engaged to run the hotel, and he in turn suggested Shulze and Weaver as architects. The operating company, the Los Angeles Biltmore Company, was formed in November 1921. At an estimated cost of $8.5 million, there was some question as to how the money would be raised. The CIC undertook to sell $3.5 million in bonds and the rest in stock. Sartori organized the 600-stockholder syndicate behind the financing of the hotel. Three banks agreed to sell the bonds at 1.5 points above par (each $100 bond therefore sold for $101.50). The stock offering sold out in five weeks.

As a member and President of the Central Business District Association, he was also instrumental in developing Los Angeles Civic Center and the Subway Terminal Building. He was chairman of a committee which sought a site for a civic center for Los Angeles north of First Street, and sought voter approval of the $7,500,000 bond measure to build the new City Hall. The Subway Terminal Building was a joint project of the Pacific Electric Railway and the Subway Terminal Corporation, consisting of some of the city's leading citizens, which was completed in 1926 over the terminus of the Pacific Electric Railway's Hollywood subway. Sartori was interested in the project partly as a means for stabilizing the central business district, the center of which had shifted over the years.

During World War I, he was a factor in organizing the Los Angeles Steamship and Dry Dock Company, and was later a director in that firm. He was also a director for The Los Angeles and Salt Lake Railroad.

== Personal life ==
In 1921, he joined the Valentine Camp, a 160-acre private camp on the eastern slope of the high Sierra above Mammoth. It was owned by E.E. Milliken, W.L. Valentine, Sartori, William G. Kerckhoff, Henry W. O'Melveney and J.E. Cook. He enjoyed many hours here, away from the pressures of commercial life.

Sartori was active in the Los Angeles Athletic Club, was a past president of the California Club, and past director for the Automobile Club of Southern California and a member of the Jonathan Club and the University Club.

Sartori and his wife had a single foster daughter, Juliette Boileau, who married George Wallace, President of Security-First National Bank.

In 1891 Mrs. Sartori became one of the founding members of the Friday Morning club and had an interest in opera and athletics. She was a regent of the University of California and was active in the Federation of Women's Clubs.

Margaret Sartori died on May 2, 1937. Joseph Francis Sartori died October 6, 1946.

== Bibliography ==
- Beardwood, Jack (1973). From Browns to Greens: A History of the Los Angeles Country Club, 1898-1973. Los Angeles, California: Los Angeles Country Club.
- Cleland, Robert Glass; Putnam, Frank B. (1965). Isaias W. Hellman and the Farmers and Merchants Bank. San Marino, California: The Huntington Library.
- Cross, Ira B. (1927). Financing an Empire: History of Banking in California, Vol. II. Los Angeles, California: The S.J. Clarke Publishing Company.
- Davis, Margaret Leslie (1998). The Los Angeles Biltmore: The Host of the Coast. Los Angeles, California: Regal Biltmore Hotel.
- Fogelson, Robert (1967). The Fragmented Metropolis Los Angeles: 1850-1930. Cambridge, Massachusetts: Harvard University Press.
- Graves, Jackson Alpheus (1929). My Seventy Years in California 1857-1927. Los Angeles, California: Times-Mirror Press.
- Graves, Jackson Alpheus (1930). California Memories 1857-1930. Los Angeles, California: Times-Mirror Press.
- Guinn, James Miller (1915). A History of California and an Extended History of Los Angeles and Environs, Volume 3. Los Angeles, California: Historic Record Company.
- James, Marquis; Rowland James, Bessie (1954). Biography of a Bank: the Story of Bank of America N.T. & S.A.. New York, New York: Harper Brothers. ISBN 9780837138343.
- Kurinsky, Erin (2010). Finding Aid, Dominguez Land Corporation Collection. Dominguez Hills, California: Department of Archives and Special Collections, University Library, California State University, Dominguez Hills.
- Larkin, Frederick G. Jr. (1971). Security Pacific Bank's 100 Years of Keeping Faith with the Community. New York, New York: Newcommun Society.
- McGroarty, John Steven (1933). California of the South, Volume IV. Los Angeles, California: Clarke Publishing.
- Mullholland, Catherine (2000). William Mullholland and the Rise of Los Angeles. Los Angeles, California: University of California Press.
- Radell, Neva Henrietta (1985). The Sartori Legacy. Cedar Falls, iowa: Cedar Falls Historical Society.
- Shanahan, Dennis F.; Elliott, Charles Jr. (1984). Historic Torrance: A Pictorial History of Torrance, California. Redondo Beach, California: Legends Press.
- Starr, Kevin (1990). Material Dreams: Southern California Through the 1920s. New York, New York: Oxford University Press.
- Swett, Ira (1975). Lines of the Pacific Electric Southern and Western Districts. Los Angeles, California: Interurbans Press.
- Tygiel, Jules (1996). The Great Los Angeles Swindle: Oil, Stocks, and Scandal During the Roaring Twenties. Los Angeles, California: University of California Press.
- Wallace, George M. (1948). Joseph Francis Sartori 1858-1946. Los Angeles, California: Ward Ritchie Press.
- Wiley, John L. (1927). History of Monrovia. Pasadena, California: Press of Pasadena Star-News.
