= Isaias W. Hellman Jr. =

American financier (1871–1920)

- Hellman c. 1915

President of Wells Fargo Nevada National Bank
- In office 1920–1920
- Preceded by: Isaias W. Hellman
- Succeeded by: Frederick L. Lipman

Personal details
- Born: Isaias William Hellman; March 30, 1871 Los Angeles, California
- Died: May 10, 1920 (aged 49) San Francisco, California
- Resting place: Home of Peace Cemetery and Emanu-El Mausoleum
- Spouse: Frances Jacobi (m. 1898)
- Relations: Herman W. Hellman (uncle); Mayer Lehman (uncle); Warren Hellman (grandson); Frederick L. Ehrman (nephew)
- Children: 4, including Isaias
- Parent(s): Isaias W. Hellman; Esther Newgass Hellman
- Education: University of California, Berkeley

Isaias William Hellman (Note: Although his middle name was different from that of his father, his being William versus his father's which was Wolf, he was still known as Isaias W. Hellman Jr. The same was true of his son, Isaias Warren Hellman, who was known as Isaias W. Hellman III despite his middle name being different from both his father and grandfather.) (March 30, 1871 – May 10, 1920) was an American banker who served as president of the Union Trust Company and, briefly, of Wells Fargo Bank shortly before his death.

== Early life ==
Hellman, who went by Marco, was born on March 30, 1871, in Los Angeles, California. He was the only son of Esther (née Newgass) Hellman (1851–1908) and Isaias W. Hellman, who had been born in Reckendorf in the Kingdom of Bavaria and emigrated to California in 1859. His two sisters were Clara (née Hellman) Heller and Florence (née Hellman) Ehrman.

His paternal uncle was the banker and real estate investor Herman W. Hellman. His maternal aunt, Babetta Newgass, was the wife of Mayer Lehman, one of the three founding brothers of the investment bank Lehman Brothers. Among his large extended family were first cousins, Irving Lehman (the Chief Judge of the New York Court of Appeals) and Herbert H. Lehman (a U.S. Senator and Governor of New York).

After being educated in the public schools of Los Angeles, he attended the University of California, Berkeley, where he graduated in 1892.

== Career ==
Immediately after graduation, he began working for the Nevada Bank of San Francisco (of which his father was president) as a clerk. In 1894, he moved to Los Angeles and became a manager of the Farmers and Merchants Bank of Los Angeles (which his father founded with John G. Downey, a former governor of California). In 1895, he returned to San Francisco to become manager of the Union Trust Company.

In 1916, he was elected president of the Union Trust Company. Following his father's death in April 1920, he succeeded, on his own deathbed, as president of the Wells Fargo Nevada National Bank. At the time of his death, he was vice president of Farmers and Merchants Bank of Los Angeles and was one of the directors of the Panama–Pacific International Exposition. He was succeeded as president of Wells Fargo Nevada National Bank by Frederick L. Lipman.

== Personal life ==
On September 7, 1898, Hellman was married to Frances Jacobi (1877–1959). She was the daughter of Frederick Jacobi Sr. and Flora (née Brandenstein) Jacobi and a sister of composer Frederick Jacobi. Together, they were the parents of:

- Isaias Warren Hellman III (1899–1978), who also became president of Wells Fargo, serving from 1943 to 1960; he married Dortha Elane.
- Frederick Jacobi Hellman (1901–1965), who married Rosalie Louise Greene, a daughter of Louis Cauffman Greene, president of the Alaska Commercial Company.
- Florence Hellman (1904–1954), who married lawyer Lloyd William Dinkelspiel, head of the Jewish Welfare Board.
- Marco Francis Hellman (1906–1973), an investment banker who married Ruth Koshland, a daughter of wool merchant Jesse Koshland and granddaughter of Simon Koshland.

After a long illness, Hellman died on May 10, 1920, in San Francisco, California. His widow lived for another nearly forty years later before her death at her home in San Francisco in December 1959.

=== Descendants ===
Through his son Marco, he was a grandfather of Frederick Warren Hellman (1934–2011), who succeeded his uncle, Frederick L. Ehrman, as president of Lehman Brothers. He later co-founded Hellman & Friedman, and Hellman, Ferri Investment Associates (today known as Matrix Partners).

Business positions
Preceded by Isaias W. Hellman	President of Wells Fargo Nevada National Bank; 1920	Succeeded by Frederick L. Lipman
