= Frederick L. Ehrman =

American banker (1906–1973)

- Born: Frederick Louis Ehrman; January 3, 1906; San Francisco, California, US
- Died: December 20, 1973 (aged 67); New York City, US
- Education: University of California, Berkeley
- Spouse: Edith May Koshland
- Children: 2
- Relatives: F. Warren Hellman (nephew); Louis Schwabacher (grandfather)

Frederick Louis Ehrman (January 3, 1906 – December 20, 1973) was an American banker who served as president, chief executive and chairman of Lehman Brothers.

== Early life ==
Ehrman was born in San Francisco, California in 1906 into "one of the Bay area's most distinguished pioneer families." He was the only child of Mina Louise (née Schwabacher) Ehrman (1878–1958) and Albert Leopold Ehrman (1870–1961). His father operated his own brokerage firm and twice served as president of the San Francisco Stock Exchange, serving from 1920 to 1922 and again from 1931 to 1933. His parents commissioned Willis Jefferson Polk of Willis Polk & Company to build them a house at 2880 Broadway in Pacific Heights, San Francisco (later owned by Gordon Getty).

His paternal uncle, Sidney Meyer Ehrman, was a lawyer who co-founded the Heller, Powers & Ehrman law firm with his brother-in-law Emanuel S. Heller. Both Ehrman and Heller were sons-in-law of The Nevada Bank president Isaias W. Hellman (himself the brother-in-law of Mayer Lehman, one of the three founding brothers of the investment bank Lehman Brothers). (Note: Frederick's uncle, Sidney Meyer Ehrman (1873–1975), was married to Florence (née Hellman) Ehrman (1882–1964). Her brother was Isaias W. Hellman Jr. (1871–1920) (both children of Isaias W. Hellman), was the father of Isaias W. Hellman III (1899–1978), president of Wells Fargo Bank from 1943 to 1960, and Marco Hellman (1906–1973), who married Ruth Koshland (1913–1972), the younger sister of Ehrman's wife, Edith May "Didi" Koshland (1910–2000). Marco and Ruth were the parents of F. Warren Hellman (1934–2011), Ehrman's nephew and successor at Lehman Brothers.) His cousin Sidney Heller "Tod" Ehrman died of a brain infection in London in 1930 at age 24, and another cousin, Esther Hellman Ehrman, married Claude Lazard (a grandson of Simon Lazard, founder of Lazard Frères & Co.). His maternal grandfather was Louis Schwabacher, a pioneering Bavarian-born Jewish merchant.

He graduated from the University of California, Berkeley in 1927.

== Career ==
Ehrman joined the investment banking firm of Lehman Brothers by 1929. He became chairman of the executive committee in 1969 after Robert Lehman died. When the firm incorporated in 1970, Ehrman was elected chairman of the corporation. He remained head of both the corporation and partnership until September 1973 when Peter G. Peterson replaced him as chairman and chief executive of Lehman Brothers and Ehrman's "nephew", F. Warren Hellman, became president of the investment banking house.

In 1959, he was part of a group of insurgent stockholders which failed to gain control of Bayuk Cigars with a group that included Edgar M. Cullman, Simon H. Rifkind and Robert E. Simon, Jr. among others.

Beginning around 1939, Ehrman became a director of the Radio-Keith-Orpheum Corporation. At his death, Ehrman was a director of the Greyhound Corporation, Beckman Instruments, the 20th Century-Fox Film Corporation, the May Department Stores Company, Travelers Express Company, the General Fire & Casualty Company, and he was a member of the Bankers Trust Company advisory committee. He was also a former governor of the New York Stock Exchange and participated in a study of the stock market's reorganization (that reduced the board from thirty-three-members to twenty-five).

== Personal life ==
Ehrman was married to Edith May "Didi" Koshland (1910–2000), a daughter of Jesse Koshland and Edith (née Guggenheim) Koshland. Didi's paternal grandfather was wool merchant Simon Koshland and her maternal grandfather was Leon Guggenheim, vice president of Imperial Oil Company. Her sister Ruth was the wife of investment banker Marcos Hellman (the youngest son of Isaias W. Hellman Jr., president of the Union Trust Company and Wells Fargo Bank). Together, they lived at 480 Park Avenue in New York City and had a home in Armonk, New York, and were the parents of two daughters:

- Edith Ehrman (1932–1974), an art collector.
- Anita Louise Ehrman (1935–1963), who represented the Hearst Headline Service at the United Nations in 1961.

He was a member of the Century, Country, Sleepy Hollow Country Club, Dutchess Valley Rod and Gun Club, Board Room and Bond of New York and the Petroleum Club of Los Angeles.

Ehrman died at his Park Avenue home in December 1973. His widow, who outlived both of their daughters, died in November 2000 "after a long life and a short illness".

=== Philanthropy and legacy ===
In 1959, he was elected to the board of Bellevue Hospital, and became chairman in 1969. Ehrman was also chairman of the executive committee of New York University Medical Center, a director of the American Cancer Society and the Downtown-Lower Manhattan Association (founded by David Rockefeller to revitalize Lower Manhattan, which led to the construction of the World Trade Center), a trustee and member of the executive committee of New York University, and a trustee of Lawrence Hall of Science at the University of California and of the Institute for the Crippled and Disabled. He was also a director of the United Nations Association, and chairman of the New York State Republican National Finance Committee in 1969.

Ehrman and his wife were major contributors to NYU Langone's medical library, which was named the Frederick L. Ehrman Library, and to an endowed professorship in cell biology. After his death, his widow continued Ehrman's philanthropic efforts on behalf of NYU. They also built a large public pool named in honor of their daughter Anita.
