= Homemade Cafe =

Casual restaurant in Berkeley, California

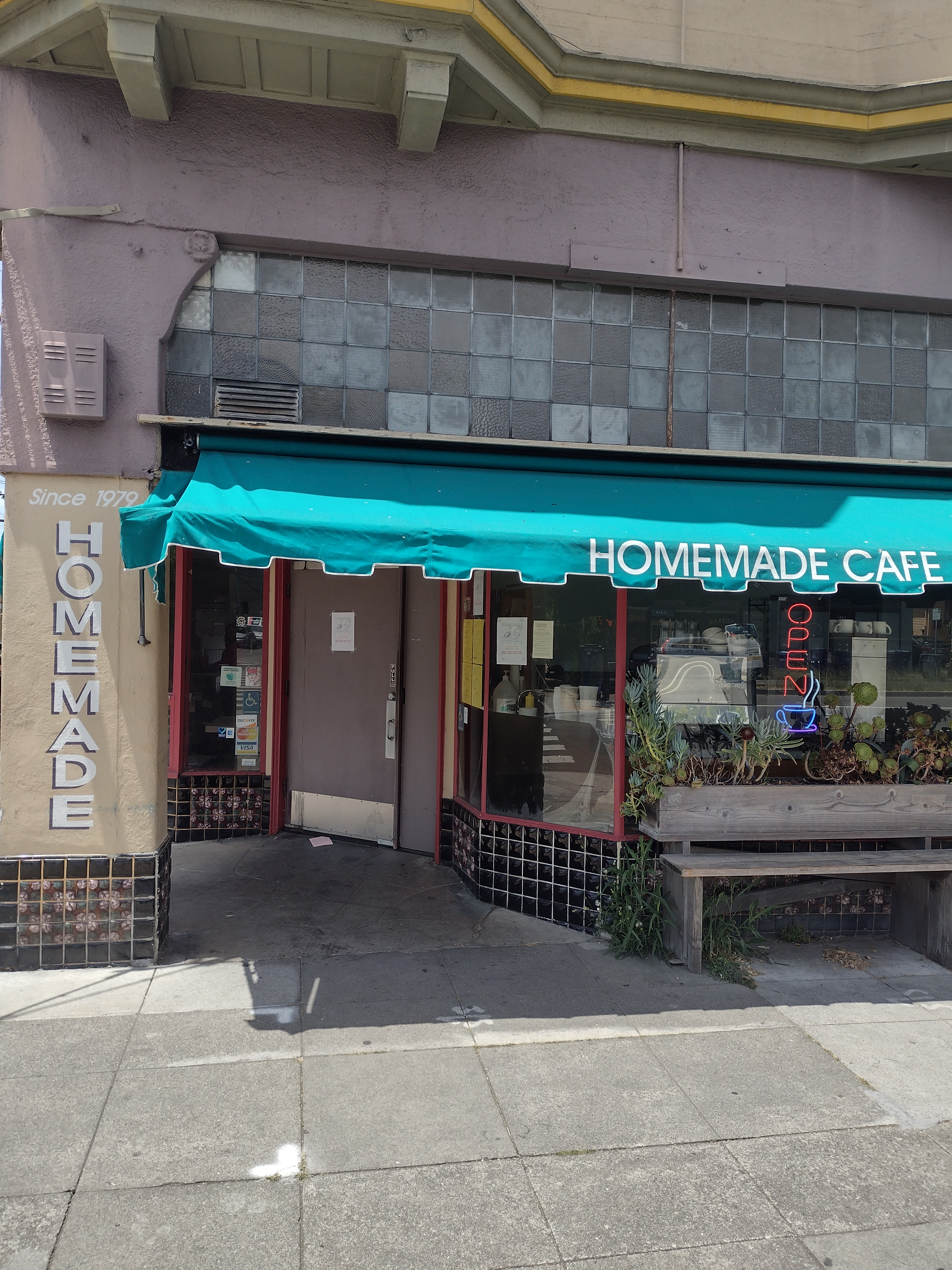
- Homemade Cafe in June 2023
- Interactive map of Homemade Cafe

Restaurant information
- Established: November 1979
- Owner: Collin Doran
- Previous owners: Norm Berzon and Janet Hinze
- Head chef: Collin Doran
- Location: 2454 Sacramento Street, Berkeley, Alameda County, California, 94702, United States
- Coordinates: 37°51′44.1678″N 122°16′53.1726″W

The Homemade Cafe is a casual restaurant in Berkeley, California that serves comfort food. It gained national attention for its "Everybody Eats" program to provide free meals to those in the community experiencing food insecurity. It closed in January 2024, but as of February 2025, it has re-opened with a limited menu.

== History ==
Norm Berzon and Janet Hinze opened the Homemade Cafe at 2454 Sacramento Street in Berkeley in 1979, intending it to be a "a working class place" that offered quality food at affordable prices and that treated its employees very well.

Described by food writer Janet Fletcher as "down home and funky", it celebrated its 20th anniversary in November 1999. That same year, Collin Doran, who grew up eating at the diner as a child, started working there as a busser, and in 2011, he purchased the business from the owners.

In 2018, the Homemade Cafe began hosting pop-up dinners in addition to its regular breakfast and lunch service, and in 2021 it started offering regular dinner service.

In 2021, the restaurant was closed between March for a major plumbing project. On reopening in July, a new tipless pricing model was announced to ensure equitable compensation for the employees. It included a 7% "living wage fee".

The Homemade Cafe had 15 employees in May 2023.

== Cuisine ==
Owner-chef Doran told Berkeleyside in 2021 the cafe served "American comfort food strongly influenced by the dishes and sensibilities of California, New York City and southern cuisines". The food served was either homemade (at the restaurant) or was sourced from local businesses.

Bacon has been whimsically featured in offerings at the restaurant. In 2017, the "4th Annual Bacon, Bacon, Bacon, and More Bacon and Chocolate Dinner" was a fundraiser for the Leukemia & Lymphoma Society. Doran has the word "bacon" tattooed on his right forearm, and a mural painted on the outside of the cafe once showed a cartoon of a slice of bacon holding a demonstration sign reading, "Peace Love and Bacon".

== "Everybody Eats" program ==
Inspired by the People's Free Food Program, Doran, soon after taking ownership, began offering a free hot breakfast to anyone in need. After serving thousands of free meals, in 2023 the restaurant made its "Everybody Eats" program official. It was featured on the Today show in October 2023.

For five dollars, customers can purchase a ticket which was posted on a bulletin board outside, which anyone who is hungry could redeem for a free two-egg breakfast with potatoes, toast, and coffee. "But on days when we run out of tickets, we keep serving free meals anyway," Doran told The Washington Post, adding, "Nobody should go hungry. This is the right thing to do."

== Closing and reopening ==
The Homemade Cafe closed on January 1, 2024. Citing recent and persistent increases in product costs, the chef-owner said, "It is just financially impossible to stay open." Doran told KTVU news that while daily breakfast and lunch service was being discontinued, he was not selling the business and that the site would host weekend and dinner pop-ups and rentals.

In February 2025, the Homemade Cafe announced it would reopen in collaboration with financing from local businessman Rohit Singh. After a midweek soft opening, it fully reopened with a reduced menu on February 21.
