= Richard C. Atkinson =

American educational psychologist and academic

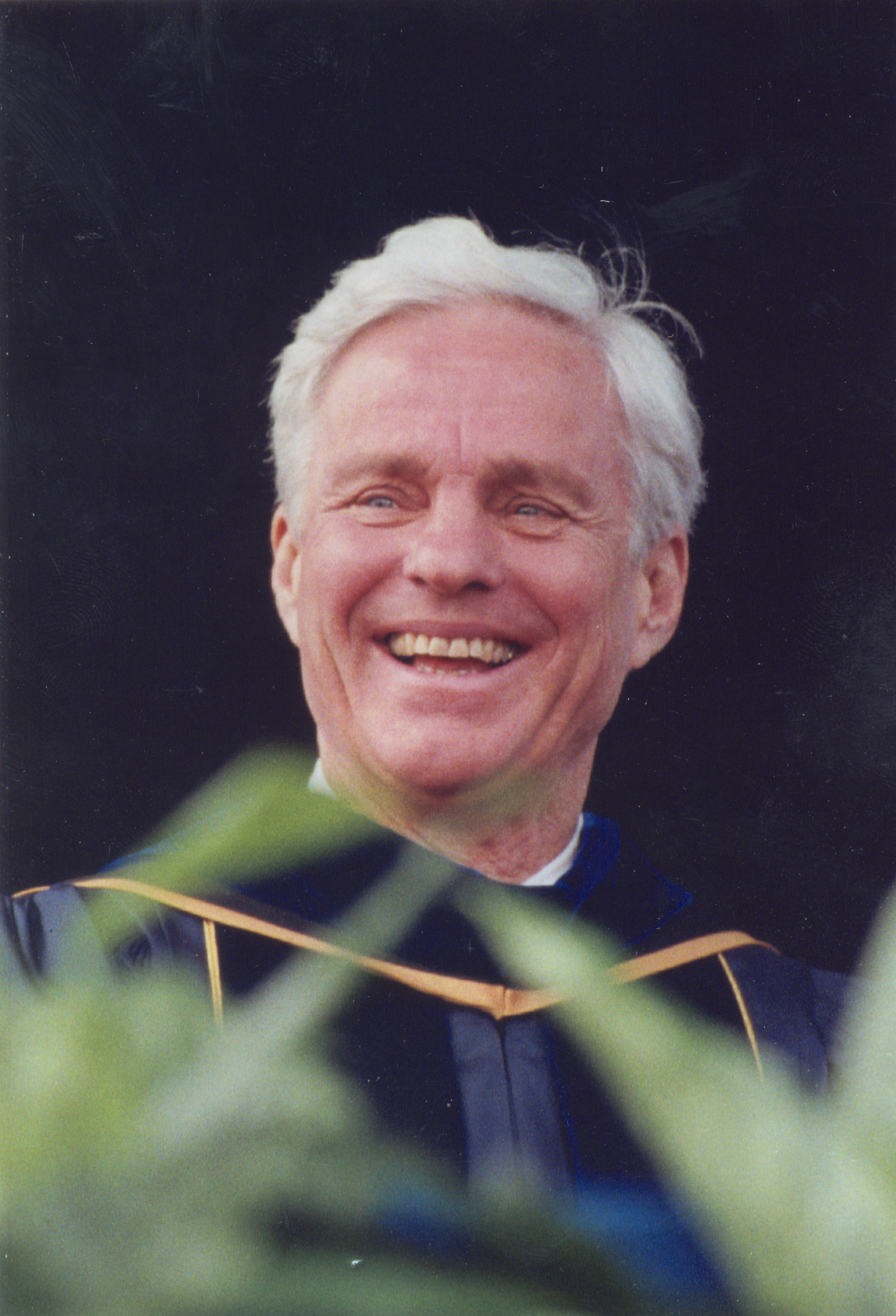

17th President of the University of California
- In office 1995–2003
- Preceded by: Jack W. Peltason
- Succeeded by: Robert C. Dynes

5th Chancellor of the University of California, San Diego
- In office 1980–1995
- Preceded by: William D. McElroy
- Succeeded by: Robert C. Dynes

5th Director of the National Science Foundation
- In office 1977–1980
- President: Jimmy Carter
- Preceded by: Guyford Stever
- Succeeded by: John Brooks Slaughter

Personal details
- Born: Richard Chatham Atkinson; March 19, 1929 (age 97) Oak Park, Illinois, U.S.
- Spouse: Rita Atkinson
- Education: University of Chicago; Indiana University
- Profession: Psychologist and cognitive scientist, professor, administrator
- Institutions: Stanford University; UC San Diego; University of California
- Awards: E. L. Thorndike Award (1980); Revelle Medal (1995); APA Award for Lifetime Contributions to Psychology (2002); Clark Kerr Award (2018)

Academic background
- Thesis: An analysis of rote serial position effects in terms of a statistical model (1955)
- Doctoral advisor: Cletus J. Burke

Academic work
- Institutions: Stanford University; UC San Diego; University of California
- Doctoral students: Richard Shiffrin

Richard Chatham Atkinson (born March 19, 1929) is an American professor of cognitive science and psychology. He served as the 17th president of the University of California, as the 5th chancellor of the University of California, San Diego, and as the 5th director of the National Science Foundation.

== Biography ==
=== Early years ===
Atkinson was born on March 19, 1929, in Oak Park, Illinois, to Herbert and Margaret Atkinson. He earned a bachelor's degree at the University of Chicago and a Ph.D. at Indiana University. After serving two years in the U.S. Army, Atkinson joined the faculty at Stanford University in 1956. Except for three years at UCLA, he served on the Stanford faculty from 1956 to 1980.

=== Stanford University ===
At Stanford University he held appointments in the Department of Psychology, School of Engineering, Graduate School of Education, and Institute for Mathematical Studies in the Social Sciences. In the mid-1960s, he began publishing a series of papers with his graduate students and postdoctoral fellows that formed the basis for a general theory of memory. A 1968 article called "Human Memory: A Proposed System and Its Control Processes," co-authored with his graduate student, Richard Shiffrin, is one of the most cited publications in the behavioral and cognitive sciences over the past five decades; it still receives about 700 citations a year.

The Atkinson-Shiffrin paper proposes a memory system whose structure is fixed (sensory register, short-term store, long-term store) but whose control processes (encoding, storage, retrieval, and decision rules) are variable. The two authors describe a theory from which one can derive formal models to predict an individual's performance on a variety of memory tasks. Their approach brought together the emerging fields of mathematical psychology and computer modeling to offer a cognitive view of memory. The general theory has withstood critical challenges and been considered the standard by which others are measured. Memory and Cognition devoted a special issue in 2019 to "Five Decades of Cumulative Progress in Understanding Human Memory and Its Control Processes Sparked by Atkinson and Shiffrin (1968)." In 2023, Journal of Memory and Language republished the 1968 paper, accompanied by an article on its historical significance.

Another focus of Atkinson's research, conducted with his Stanford colleague Patrick Suppes, concerned developing computer-assisted instruction (CAI) to teach mathematics and reading to young children. An example is a program for teaching reading in grades K-3. A "response history" is maintained on each student and continually updated. Built into the program is a model of the learning process that analyzes each student's response history to make moment-by-moment decisions as to what should be studied next to optimize the student's performance. Atkinson and Suppes later founded Computer Curriculum Corporation, the first company to introduce computers into the classroom.

While at Stanford, Atkinson served as founding editor for the Journal of Mathematical Psychology. He was also chair of the Mathematical Social Science Board of the Center for Advanced Study in the Behavioral Sciences, which ran summer institutes (among other activities) for advanced doctoral students interested in learning about mathematical models in the behavioral and social sciences. In 1967, Atkinson and his wife, Rita Loyd Atkinson, joined their Stanford colleague, Ernest Hilgard, as authors of the textbook Introduction to Psychology. They ceased being authors with the publication of the 12th edition, and in later editions the title was changed to Atkinson and Hilgard's Introduction to Psychology. Atkinson's scientific work has been translated into nine languages, including a Russian and a Chinese translation of his collected papers.

=== National Science Foundation ===
In 1975, Atkinson took a leave of absence from Stanford to begin a temporary appointment as deputy director of the National Science Foundation (NSF). His career took a different course when he agreed to remain at NSF, serving first as acting director (1976–77) and then as director (1977–80) appointed by President Jimmy Carter.

Atkinson's task was to lead the Foundation through what one commentator called "a rebuilding from the ravages of the Nixon anti-science era." Skeptics in Congress and the media often attacked basic research, most of it conducted in universities, as a drain on public money that produced few practical results. Senator William Proxmire's Golden Fleece Awards for waste and fraud in public programs were the best-known examples; NSF received several. In Congressional testimony and in the press, Atkinson defended the integrity of NSF's peer review process and the seminal role basic research plays in laying the groundwork for advances in science and technology.

Atkinson established the NSF Industry-University Cooperative Research Program at a time when collaborative research between private companies and universities, now accepted, was rare. He initiated a special program at NSF to fund research on the relationship between investments in research and economic growth, an early contribution to the field of economics known as "new growth theory". H elevated engineering to a full directorate at NSF to reflect its importance to science and the nation. He advocated with Congress for legislation giving companies a tax credit for investing in their own research and for supporting university research. He began a series of policy studies that led to the1980 Bayh-Dole Act, which transferred the intellectual property rights in federally sponsored research from the U.S. government to universities.

In his role as NSF director, Atkinson also negotiated the first memorandum of understanding between the People's Republic of China and the United States, an agreement for the exchange of scientists and scholars. It became part of a more comprehensive agreement on science and technology between China and the United States signed by President Carter and Chairman Deng Xiao Ping during the Chairman's visit to the United States in January 1979.

=== UC San Diego ===
As chancellor of the University of California, San Diego (UCSD) from 1980-1995, Atkinson instituted a major administrative reorganization and launched an effort to strengthen UC San Diego's ties with the city of San Diego. This effort yielded dividends in the form of financial and community support, with private giving rising dramatically during his chancellorship. Despite a series of tight budgets in the late 1980s, he found ways to fund the construction of new buildings and support new academic programs. UCSD's faculty expanded by nearly 50 percent and enrollment doubled to about 18,000 students. Early in his tenure, consistent with his views about the value of engineering at NSF, he established a school of engineering.

Atkinson encouraged technology transfer and active involvement with industry, especially with the small, high-technology companies that were forming around San Diego in the 1980s and 1990s. In 1985, UC San Diego Extension began the UCSD CONNECT program, which became a model for preparing entrepreneurs in high-technology fields to launch start-up companies.

A few years after Atkinson's arrival at UCSD, a member of the Harvard University faculty, Lee H. Perry, sued him in San Diego Superior Court. Represented by the "palimony" attorney, Marvin Mitchelson, Perry claimed she had an intimate relationship with Atkinson that resulted in a pregnancy, and that Atkinson persuaded her to have an abortion, promising that he would have a child with her at a later time. Her lawsuit alleged intentional infliction of emotional distress, fraud, and deceit. Before trial, the Superior Court granted Atkinson's motion for summary judgment on the fraud and deceit claim as initially filed, and sustained his demurrer to the claim as amended without further leave to amend (which operated as a dismissal of that claim). In 1986, the case went to trial on Perry's remaining claim for emotional distress. Atkinson settled that claim without admitting liability, but Perry reserved the right to appeal from the trial court's ruling on the demurrer to her fraud and deceit claim. In 1987, the Court of Appeal affirmed the Superior Court's dismissal of that claim. In 1988, the Supreme Court of California denied her petition for review, which effectively ended the case.

In 1982, UCSD was elected to the Association of American Universities. The National Research Council's 1995 report on the quality of graduate programs in U.S. universities ranked the scholarly and scientific caliber of UCSD faculty and its graduate offerings tenth in the nation, higher than any other public university except UC Berkeley.

=== University of California System ===
The University of California Board of Regents chose Atkinson as the seventeenth president of the UC System in August 1995. One month earlier, the Regents had approved SP-1, a ban on racial and ethnic preferences in admissions.

Atkinson's first step was to initiate an in-depth review of UC admissions in light of the university's changed circumstances. The goal was to ensure that its policies and practices, while meeting the requirements of SP-1, would also continue to be "demonstrably inclusive and fair." The result of this review, approved by the Academic Senate and the Regents, was a broader, more flexible perspective on evaluating readiness for college. Along with the usual grades and test scores, the undergraduate admission process now included consideration of students' "opportunity to learn," defined as the educational, economic, or social difficulties the student had faced during schooling and evidence of persistence in working toward high academic achievement. In addition to these policy changes, the Regents' resolution called on the administration to consult with various UC constituencies on developing "proposals for new directions and increased funding" to raise the UC eligibility rate of minority and other underrepresented students. The result was the report of the Outreach Task Force, presented to the Regents in July 1997.

In his first year as president, Atkinson established the Industry-University Cooperative Research Program (IUCRP), an investment in research partnerships with industry in disciplines essential to California's high-tech economy. The program's emphasis on promising early-stage research ripe for practical application was directed at stimulating California's productivity and competitiveness. In the same spirit, Atkinson committed the university to addressing a crisis in the state's supply of highly trained engineers and computer scientists. UC enrollments in these disciplines rose by nearly 70 percent—the first real growth in the state's programs in engineering since the 1968 Terman Report virtually ended expansion of engineering education in California.

In 2000, Governor Gray Davis asked the university to establish four new research enterprises on its campuses, the California Institutes for Science and Innovation. Their mission is to generate discoveries ripe for application in the fields of biomedicine, bioengineering, nanosystems, telecommunications, and information technology through partnerships with the state's entrepreneurial industries.

The Board of Regents voted unanimously to rescind SP-1 at its May 2001 meeting. The 1996 passage of Proposition 209, which eliminated racial and ethnic preferences in all State entities, including the University of California, meant SP-1 had become redundant. More troubling to some Regents was the concern that the 1995 policy "may have created the perception that underrepresented students were unwelcome at the University." The Board's resolution reaffirmed the Academic Senate's authority over admissions standards and UC's responsibility for selecting a diverse and highly qualified student body. In a February 2001 speech at the American Council on Education, Atkinson announced he was recommending elimination of the SAT as a requirement for admission to the University of California.

=== Post-retirement ===
After retiring from the presidency in 2003, Atkinson became chair of the Division of Behavioral and Social Sciences and Education and served in that position until 2011. The division, part of the National Academies of Science, Engineering, and Medicine, works to advance the frontiers of the behavioral and social sciences and their applications to public policy. Atkinson and his wife, Rita Loyd, met in graduate school at Indiana University and were married until her death on Christmas Day 2020.

=== Honors ===
Atkinson has been elected to the National Academy of Sciences, the National Academy of Medicine, the National Academy of Education (NAEd), the American Academy of Arts and Sciences, and the American Philosophical Society. He is past president of the American Association for the Advancement of Science, former chair of the Association of American Universities, and the recipient of many honorary degrees.The National Science Board selected him for the Vannevar Bush Award in 2003 for his contributions to the scientific enterprise. A mountain in Antarctica is named in his honor. A collection of Richard Atkinson's Presidential and Scientific Papers is available through the California Digital Library at https://escholarship.org/uc/atkinson_papers

== Selected bibliography ==
=== Chapters in books ===
- Atkinson, Richard C. (1960), "A theory of stimulus discrimination learning", in Arrow, Kenneth J.; Karlin, Samuel; Suppes, Patrick (eds.), Mathematical models in the social sciences, 1959: Proceedings of the first Stanford symposium, Stanford mathematical studies in the social sciences, IV, Stanford, California: Stanford University Press, pp. 221–241, ISBN 978-0-8047-0021-4.
- Atkinson, Richard C.; Shiffrin, R.M. (1968), "Human memory: A proposed system and its control processes", in Spence, K.W.; Spence, J.T. (eds.), The psychology of learning and motivation: advances in research and theory (volume 2), New York: Academic Press, pp. 89–195.
- Atkinson, Richard C.; Wilson, H.A. (1969), "Computer-assisted instruction", in Atkinson, Richard C.; Wilson, H.A. (eds.), Computer-assisted instruction: a book of readings, New York: Academic Press.

=== Journal articles ===
- Atkinson, Richard C. (1967). "Instruction in initial reading under computer control: The Stanford Project". Educational Data Processing. 4 (4): 175–192.
- Atkinson, Richard C. (April 1968). "Computerized instruction and the learning process". American Psychologist. 23 (4): 225–239. doi:10.1037/h0020791. hdl:2060/19680025077. PMID 5647875. S2CID 15565100.
- Atkinson, Richard C.; Shiffrin, R.M. (March 1969). "Storage and retrieval processes in long-term memory". Psychological Review. 76 (2): 179–193. doi:10.1037/h0027277. S2CID 2149853.
- Atkinson, Richard C. (October 1972). "Ingredients for a theory of instruction". American Psychologist. 27 (10): 921–931. doi:10.1037/h0033572.

Government offices
Preceded by Guyford Stever	Director of the National Science Foundation; May 1977–June 1980	Succeeded by John B. Slaughter
Academic offices
Preceded by William D. McElroy	Chancellor of the University of California San Diego; 1980–1995	Succeeded by Robert C. Dynes
Preceded by Jack W. Peltason	President of the University of California; 1995–2003	Succeeded by Robert C. Dynes
