= Frances Dinkelspiel =

American journalist and author

Frances L. Dinkelspiel (born 1959) is an American journalist, author and founder of the local news website Berkeleyside. She is the author of Towers of Gold: How One Jewish Immigrant Named Isaias Hellman Created California and Tangled Vines: Greed, Murder, Obsession, and an Arsonist in the Vineyards of California.

== Education ==
A fifth-generation Californian, Dinkelspiel attended Stanford University (B.A. 1982) and the Columbia University Graduate School of Journalism (M.S. 1986).

== Career ==
In 2010, journalists Lance Knobel and Tracey Taylor joined Dinkelspiel in founding Berkeleyside, a local news website about the city of Berkeley, California.In 2018, Berkeleyside raised US$1 million through a direct public offering.

In 2016, Dinkelspiel presented a talk at the Montclair library about journalism, Isaias Hellman, Jewish involvement in the creation of California, wine in California and crime in the wine industry.

== Works ==
- Towers of Gold: How One Jewish Immigrant Named Isaias Hellman Created California (2008) St. Martin's Press. ISBN 978-0-312-35526-5
- Tangled Vines: Greed, Murder, Obsession, and an Arsonist in the Vineyards of California (2015) St. Martin's Press. ISBN 978-1250033222

== Reception ==
Towers of Gold: How One Jewish Immigrant Named Isaias Hellman Created California is a biography of Dinkelspiel's great-great-grandfather, Isaias W. Hellman, who emigrated from Germany to California in 1859 and became one of the most prominent financiers on the West Coast, eventually owning Wells Fargo Bank. The book also explored the role Jews played in the development of California. The book was a San Francisco Chronicle bestseller. The Northern California Independent Booksellers Association selected Towers of Gold as its best regional book of 2008. The San Francisco Chronicle named it to its list of best books of the year. Towers of Gold was also a finalist in nonfiction for the Northern California Book Awards.

Tangled Vines: Greed, Murder, Obsession, and an Arsonist in the Vineyards of California is about a 2005 arson fire in Northern California that destroyed 4.5 million bottles of wine, including bottles made by Dinkelspiel's great-great-grandfather, and the history of the California wine trade. Tangled Vines was a New York Times bestseller and a San Francisco Chronicle bestseller. The New York Times praised the storytelling as "clear and absorbing." The Wall Street Journal named it “one of the best books for wine lovers," Food and Wine magazine called it a “notable” release, the Washington Post recommended it, and the San Jose Mercury News named it one of its best top five wine reads. In 2017, Whittier, CA, and Benicia, CA, selected “Tangled Vines” as their one city, one book selection. Claremont, CA, selected the book for the same recognition.

== Honors and awards ==
In 2013 and 2014, the Berkeleyside staff won the "Community journalism (print/text)" award from the Society of Professional Journalists Northern California (SPJ Norcal).

In 2016, Dinkelspiel and colleague Emilie Raguso jointly won the SPJ Norcal "Explanatory journalism (print/online small division)" category for their coverage of homelessness in Berkeley. In 2017, Dinkelspiel's extensive reporting on the wine Ponzi scheme John Fox ran through his Berkeley wine store, Premier Cru, was selected by the San Francisco Press Club as the winner in the series or continuing coverage category. Dinkelspiel and Raguso also received third-place recognition in the investigative category for their 2016 coverage of homelessness in Berkeley.

In 2017, the Dinkelspiel won the San Francisco Press Club "Digital Media, Series or Continuing Coverage" category for her series titled “The fall of Premier Cru.”

In 2018, Dinkelspiel won the SPJ Norcal "Longform storytelling (print/online small division)" category for her article titled "One day, one night: The fuse that lit the Battles of Berkeley", which covered a riot caused by the appearance of the right-wing commentator Milo Yiannopoulos.

== Television appearances ==
Dinkelspiel appeared with the actress Helen Hunt on the NBC show “Who Do You Think You Are?” She also appeared in the documentary American Jerusalem and the television show American Greed, where she talked about John Fox, the subject of a series she wrote for Berkeleyside.
