= Richard Shiffrin =

American cognitive scientist (born 1942)

- Born: March 13, 1942 (age 84); New Haven, Connecticut
- Education: Stanford University; Yale University
- Known for: Empirical, theoretical, and computational work in the modeling of human cognition
- Spouse: Judith Mahy
- Children: 4
- Awards: 1995 Fellow of the National Academy of Sciences 1996 Fellow of the American Academy of Arts and Sciences 1996 Fellow of the American Psychological Society 2002 Rumelhart Prize 2005 Fellow of the American Philosophical Society
- Scientific career
- Fields: Cognitive science
- Workplaces: Indiana University
- Thesis: Search and retrieval processes in long-term memory (1968)
- Doctoral advisor: Richard C. Atkinson

Richard Martin Shiffrin (born March 13, 1942) is an American psychologist, professor of cognitive science in the Department of Psychological and Brain Sciences at Indiana University, Bloomington. Shiffrin has contributed a number of theories of attention and memory to the field of psychology. He co-authored the Atkinson–Shiffrin model of memory in 1968 with Richard Atkinson, who was his academic adviser at the time. In 1977, he published a theory of attention with Walter Schneider. With Jeroen G.W. Raaijmakers in 1980, Shiffrin published the Search of Associative Memory (SAM) model, which has served as the standard model of recall for cognitive psychologists well into the 2000s. He extended the SAM model with the Retrieving Effectively From Memory (REM) model in 1997 with Mark Steyvers.

== Biography ==
=== Career ===
Shiffrin proposed a mathematical model of memory with Richard C. Atkinson in 1968 while at Stanford University. This laid out components of short and long-term memory and processes that control the operations of memory. The Atkinson-Shiffrin memory model showed the importance and possibility of modeling the control processes of cognition, and remains one of the most highly cited in the entire field of psychology.

Shiffrin graduated with a Ph.D. in Mathematical Psychology from Stanford in 1968, and joined Indiana University as faculty that same year, where he remains today as a distinguished Professor and Luther Dana Waterman Professor of Psychological and Brain Sciences in the College of Arts and Sciences. Shiffrin also directs the department's Memory and Perception Laboratory.

In the 1980s, Shiffrin's formal theory of memory took a great leap forward with the Search of Associative Memory (SAM) model. This model quantified the nature of retrieval from long-term memory and characterized recall as a memory search with cycles of sampling and recovery. In 1984, another quantum step forward occurred, when the theory was extended to recognition memory, in which a decision is based on summed activation of related memory traces. It was a major accomplishment that the same retrieval activations that had been used in the recall model could be carried forward and used to predict a wide range of recognition phenomena. Another major step, In 1990, Shiffrin published two articles on the list-length effect which clearly established that experience leads to the differentiation, rather than the mere strengthening, of the representations of items in memory. In 1997 Shiffrin extended the SAM model with the Retrieving Effectively From Memory (REM) model.

Shiffrin runs an Annual Summer Interdisciplinary Conference (ASIC) that features talks and posters in the broad frame of Cognitive Science and related areas. Days are free for activities, and talks/posters fall in late afternoon and evening sessions, followed by dinner. The settings are in scenic and dramatic mountain venues with access to summer adventure and mountain sports such as climbing, hiking, biking, canyoning, white water rafting, and via ferrata. Attendees are welcome to bring family and friends and the conference is open to all interested parties. Invitation is not needed to attend.

== Awards ==
- Guggenheim Fellow, 1975–76
- Fellow of the American Association for the Advancement of Science
- James McKeen Cattell Sabbatical Fellowship, 1994–95
- Elected to the National Academy of Sciences, 1995
- Elected to the American Academy of Arts and Sciences, 1996
- Fellow of the American Psychological Society, 1996
- Howard Crosby Warren Medal (Society of Experimental Psychologists), 1999
- The David E. Rumelhart Prize for Contributions to the Formal Analysis of Human Cognition, 2002
- Elected to the American Philosophical Society, 2005
- William James Fellow Award (Association for Psychological Science), 2007
- Awarded IU President's Medal for Excellence, 2014

== See also ==
- Short-term memory
