= Robert C. Dynes =

Canadian-American physicist (1942–2025)

18th President of the University of California
- In office 2003–2007
- Preceded by: Richard C. Atkinson
- Succeeded by: Mark Yudof

6th Chancellor of the University of California, San Diego
- In office 1996–2003
- Preceded by: Richard C. Atkinson
- Succeeded by: Marye Anne Fox

Personal details
- Born: 8 November 1942 London, Ontario, Canada
- Died: 30 June 2025 (aged 82)
- Spouse(s): Christel Dynes (m. 1968; div. 1998) Frances Hellman (m. 1998; div. 2006) Ann Parode (m. 2007)
- Education: University of Western Ontario; McMaster University
- Profession: Academic administrator, physicist, professor, researcher
- Institutions: Bell Laboratories; University of California San Diego; University of California; University of California, Berkeley

Robert Carr Dynes (8 November 1942 – 30 June 2025) was a Canadian-American physicist. He served as the 18th president of the University of California from 2003 to 2007 and as the 6th chancellor of the University of California, San Diego from 1996 to 2003.

== Biography ==
=== Early life and education ===
Dynes was born in Ontario, Canada, where he earned a bachelor's degree in mathematics and physics from the University of Western Ontario in 1964. He then earned his master's (1965) and doctorate (1968) degrees in physics from McMaster University. He became a naturalized United States citizen in 1984.

=== Career ===
Dynes worked at Bell Laboratories from 1964 to 1990 studying semiconductors and superconductors. He then became professor of physics at the University of California, San Diego in 1991. He became chancellor of the University of California, San Diego in 1996 and was chosen in 2003 to serve the 18th president of the University of California system.

Dynes' scientific honors included the 1990 Fritz London Memorial Prize in Low Temperature Physics and his 2001 election to the Council of the National Academy of Sciences.

Dynes was also a fellow of the American Physical Society (1981), the Canadian Institute for Advanced Research, and the American Academy of Arts and Sciences. Dynes stayed active in research and headed a modest-sized low-temperature physics laboratory at Berkeley.

After five tumultuous years as the president of the University of California, filled with compensation scandals, the suicide of the University of California, Santa Cruz chancellor Denice Denton and other challenges, on 13 August 2007, Dynes announced he would resign his presidency, return to his teaching position, and spend time with his new wife, Ann Parode. He resigned on 16 August 2007, and was succeeded by Mark Yudof, a former chancellor of the University of Texas system.

In November 2008, Dynes' close aide and his UC associate president Linda Morris Williams was awarded a controversial payout and re-hired as an associate chancellor at the University of California, Berkeley by chancellor Robert Birgeneau. This event led president Mark Yudof to make changes to the buyout program.

=== Personal life and death ===
Dynes became a naturalized United States citizen in 1984. He married Cristel Dynes in 1968, but they divorced in January 1998. He married a physics professor, Frances Hellman, in May 1998, but they also divorced in 2006. He married a former UCSD legal counsel and UC Associate of the President, Ann Parode Dynes, in March 2007.

Dynes died on 30 June 2025, at the age of 82.

== Notes ==
Academic offices
Preceded by Richard C. Atkinson	Chancellor of the University of California San Diego; 1995–2003	Succeeded by Marye Anne Fox
Preceded by Richard C. Atkinson	President of the University of California; 2003–2008	Succeeded by Mark Yudof
