= Herman W. Hellman =

American banker

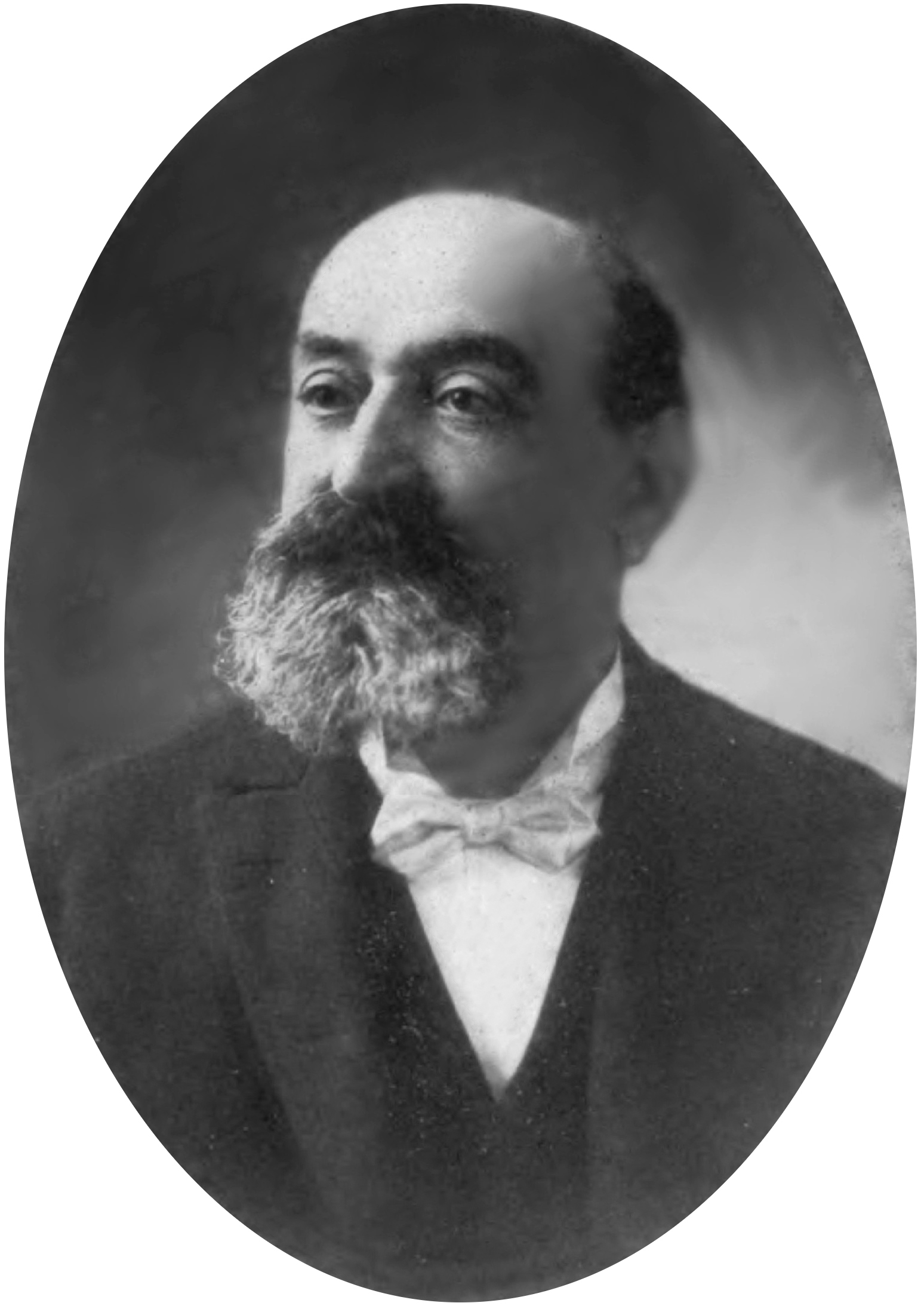
- Born: September 25, 1843; Reckendorf, Kingdom of Bavaria
- Died: October 19, 1906; Los Angeles, California
- Resting place: Home of Peace Cemetery
- Occupations: Businessman, banker, real estate investor
- Spouse: Isa Heimann
- Children: 4, including Irving Hellman
- Relatives: Isaias W. Hellman (brother); Warren Hellman (great-grandnephew)

Herman W. Hellman (September 25, 1843 – October 19, 1906) was an American businessman, banker, and real estate investor.

== Early life ==
Herman W. Hellman was born on September 25, 1843, in Reckendorf, Bavaria. He emigrated to the United States with his brother Isaias W. Hellman, arriving in Los Angeles on May 14, 1859, as a sixteen-year-old.

== Career ==
He started working as a courier from Wilmington, California, to Los Angeles for Phineas Banning. In 1861, he worked for his uncle, Samuel Hellman, who had a store in Los Angeles. Shortly after, he opened his own store at Downey Block.

He established a wholesale grocer called Hellman, Haas & Co. with Jacob Haas, the brother of Abraham Haas. They sold groceries in Southern California, Arizona, New Mexico and Texas. As his business prospered, he became one of the wealthiest men in Los Angeles by the 1880s. The company later became known as Baruch, Haas, & Co.

In 1890, he became vice president and general manager of The Farmers and Merchants Bank of Los Angeles, a bank established by his brother. He was later demoted by his brother, who found his lending practises too lenient. He resigned in 1903, and became the president of the Merchants National Bank instead. He also became a co-founder of the Los Angeles Chamber of Commerce.

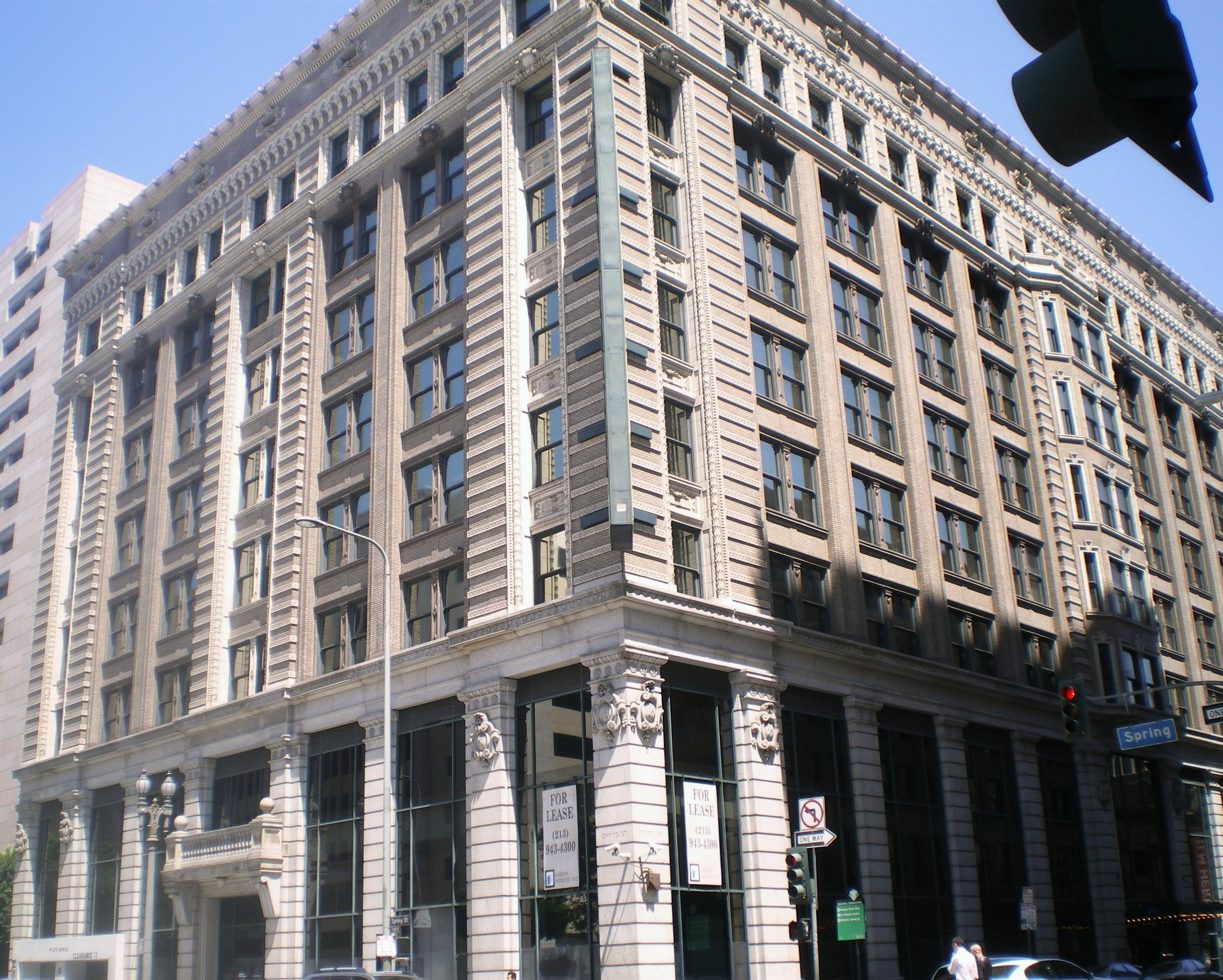
The Hellman Building in Downtown Los Angeles in 2008.

=== Hellman Buildings ===
Hellman was a large landowner in Los Angeles. He had many buildings constructed bearing his name over the years (also "H. W. Hellman Building" & "New Hellman Building"):

- one mentioned in 1876 on Third Street between Main Street and Spring streets, where a musical boarding school was located
- Main and Commercial streets "next to Litchenberger's", between Court and First streets, 1882
- Third and Main streets, 1892
- Northeast corner of Second Street and Broadway, 1897

In 1903, he hired architect Alfred Rosenheim to design the Herman W. Hellman Building at Fourth and Spring streets. The eight-story building in downtown Los Angeles was later converted to residential use.

== Personal life ==
He married his cousin Ida Heimann on July 26, 1874, while on a trip in Italy. They resided on South Hill Street in Los Angeles and owned a secondary home in Alhambra. They had five children: Clothilde, Frieda, Marco, Irving, and Amy.

He served as president of the Congregation B'nai B'rith, later known as the Wilshire Boulevard Temple.

== Death ==
Hellman died of diabetes on October 19, 1906, in Los Angeles. He was buried at the Home of Peace Cemetery in East Los Angeles.
