= Frances Hellman =

American physicist

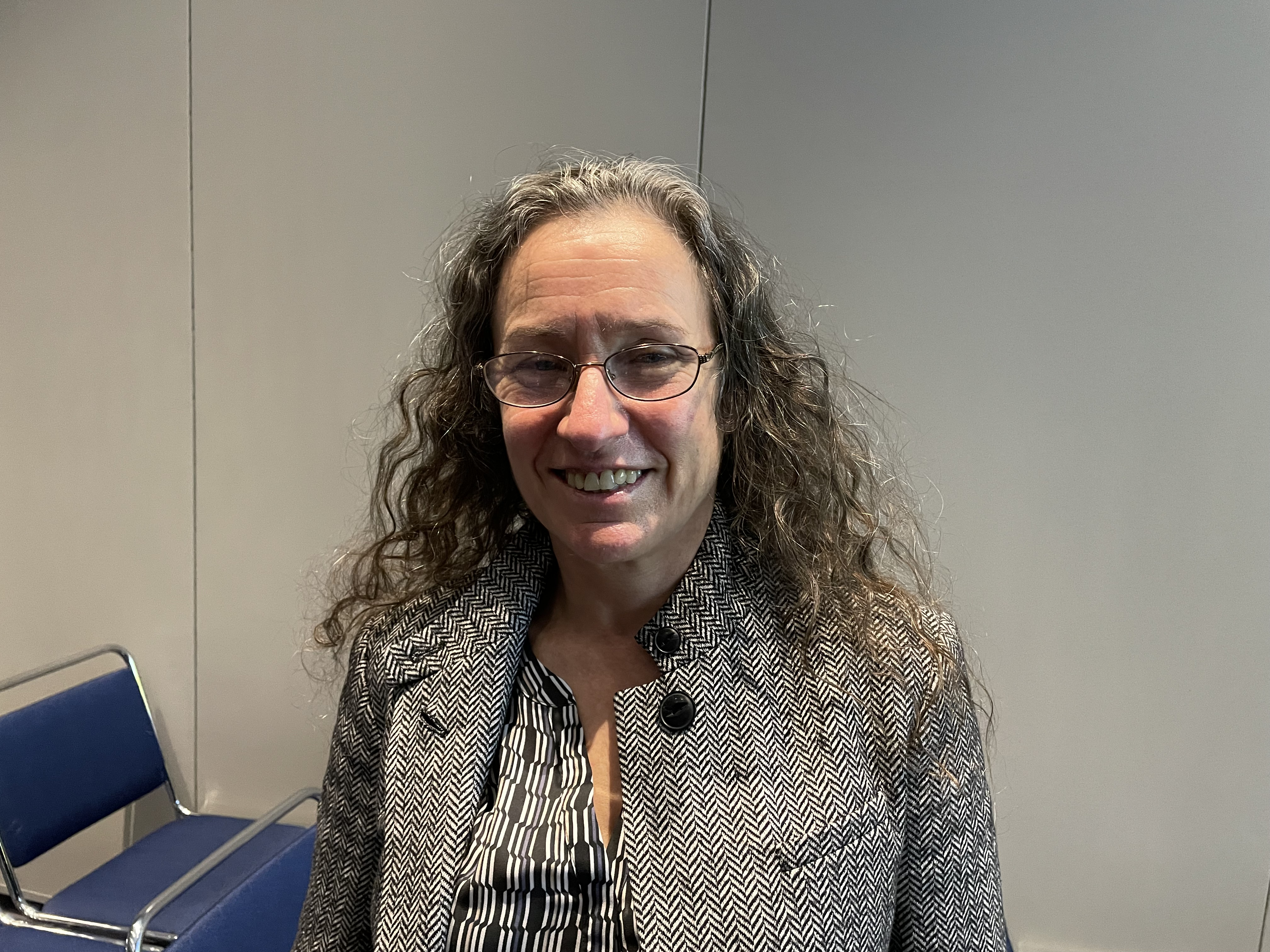
- Hellman at an American Physical Society meeting in Chicago (March 14, 2022).
- Education: Stanford University (PhD, 1985); Dartmouth College (1978)
- Spouse(s): Robert C. Dynes (m. 1998; div. 2006) Warren Breslau (m. 2009)
- Parents: Warren Hellman (father); Chris Hellman (mother)
- Relatives: Isaias W. Hellman (great-great-grandfather)
- Awards: Fellow of the American Physical Society (1997)
- Scientific career
- Fields: Physics
- Institutions: University of California, Berkeley

Frances Hellman is an American physicist who was dean of the division of mathematical and physical sciences at the University of California, Berkeley from 2015 until 2021. Her primary academic focus has been the study of the thermodynamic properties of novel solid materials, especially thin film semiconducting, superconducting, and magnetic materials. She has served as chair of the physics department and holds a dual appointment in the materials science and engineering department.

== Early life and education ==
Hellman was raised in New York City, where she attended the Brearley School. She graduated summa cum laude and Phi Beta Kappa with high honors in physics from Dartmouth College in 1978. Hellman obtained her Ph.D. in applied physics at Stanford University in 1985.

== Career ==
After receiving her Ph.D., Hellman then served as a postdoctoral fellow at Bell Laboratories from 1985 to 1987, focusing on thin-film magnetism. She moved to San Diego, California, to become an assistant professor of physics at the University of California, San Diego 1987, where she worked until 2004. She received tenure in 1994 and became a full professor in 2000. Hellman is a fellow of the American Physical Society (APS) and received their Joseph F. Keithley Award For Advances in Measurement Science in 2006.

Hellman joined Berkeley's Physics Department in January 2005. She served as chair of the department from 2007 to 2013. In 2019, she was elected to be the 2020 vice president of the American Physical Society and in 2022 became the president of APS.

== Personal ==
Hellman is the daughter of Chris and Warren Hellman of San Francisco. The Hellman family is involved philanthropically with a variety of causes, including the University of California. Frances Hellman married Robert Dynes, former UC President, in May 1998 and they divorced in 2006. In 2006, she met Warren Breslau and married him in 2009.
