= MPCi =

Chinese venture capital firm

- Native name: 经纬创投
- Formerly: Matrix Partners China
- Company type: Subsidiary
- Industry: Venture capital
- Founded: 2008; 18 years ago
- Founders: David Su; David Zhang; Bo Shao
- Headquarters: Beijing, China
- AUM: US$9.6 billion (2024)
- Number of employees: 120 (2024)
- Parent: Matrix Partners
- Website: www.matrixpartners.com.cn

MPCi (Chinese: 经纬创投; pinyin: Jīngwěi Chuàngtóu) is a Chinese venture capital (VC) firm that is headquartered in Beijing. Founded in 2008, it is the China investment arm of Matrix Partners, previously known as Matrix Partners China, before it was rebranded.

== Background ==
Matrix Partners China was founded in 2008 as an affiliate of Matrix Partners to focus on investments in China.

During the 2008 financial crisis, VC firms were cautious to invest. However Matrix Partners China was more aggressive and invested in ten companies in 2008. Its initial investment fund was US$275 million.

At its launch, Matrix Partners China focused on the technology, media, and telecommunications (TMT) investments. In its early years, the firm often spent weeks or months researching companies and getting to know founders before investing. As China's venture market became crowded with capital from government-backed funds and major investors, some decisions were made in as little as three hours with no time for due diligence.

In May 2022, The Information reported Matrix Partners China's difficulty in fundraising for its latest fund, Matrix Partners China VII (with a target of $1.5 billion), due to factors such as U.S-China geopolitical risks, weakening economy from COVID-19 lockdowns, and suboptimal returns from previous China funds. However, on 31 July 2023, Matrix Partners China VII closed at $1.6 billion, making it the largest China-focused fund that year.

On 1 July 2024, Matrix Partners said its China affiliate would be renamed MPC and its India affiliate would become Z47. The firm said the change was intended to clarify the local approach and the organizational independence of each regional team. Media coverage noted that the step stopped short of a full spin-off and compared it with splits at Sequoia Capital and GGV Capital, framing the move in the context of heightened U.S.-China geopolitical tensions.

MPCi investments include XPeng Li Auto, DiDi and Ele.me. It has also invested in sensitive space companies such as LandSpace, iSpace, and Spacety. MPCi investors have included U.S. endowments, pensions, and other American-domiciled money although it has not stated how much of its funds comes from U.S. money.
