= Warren Hellman =

American businessman and philanthropist

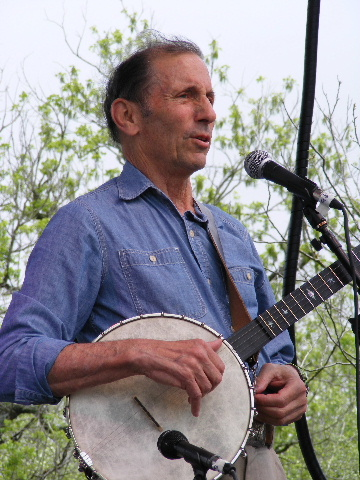
- Hellman at Old Settler's Music Festival in Driftwood, TX (2010).
- Born: July 25, 1934; New York City, United States
- Died: December 18, 2011 (aged 77); San Francisco, California
- Education: University of California, Berkeley (BA, 1955); Harvard University (MBA, 1959)
- Occupations: Private equity, Investment banking (prior)
- Employer: Hellman & Friedman
- Known for: Founder of Hellman & Friedman, Hellman, Ferri Investment Associates (today Matrix Partners)
- Spouse: Patricia Christina Sander
- Children: Marco Hellman; Frances Hellman; Judith Hellman; Patricia Hellman Gibbs
- Parent(s): Ruth Koshland; Marco Hellman
- Family: Isaias W. Hellman (great-grandfather)

Frederick Warren Hellman (July 25, 1934 – December 18, 2011) was an American billionaire investment banker and private equity investor, the co-founder of private equity firm Hellman & Friedman. Hellman also co-founded Hellman, Ferri Investment Associates, today known as Matrix Partners. He started and funded the Hardly Strictly Bluegrass festival. Hellman died in 2011, of complications from his treatment for leukemia.

== Early life and education ==
Warren Hellman was born to a Jewish family in New York and spent his early childhood in Manhattan. The son of Ruth (née Koshland) and Marco "Mick" Hellman, he was the great-grandson of banker and philanthropist Isaias W. Hellman. During World War II, his family moved to Vacaville, California, where his father served as a Major in the Army and his mother worked as a Women Airforce Service Pilot, flying military planes from aircraft factories to bases. After the war, they moved to San Francisco, where he graduated from Lowell High School. In 1951, he enrolled at the University of California, Berkeley. At Berkeley, he played for the school's water polo team and majored in economics, graduating in 1955. In 1959, he graduated with an M.B.A. from Harvard Business School.

== Career ==
After school, he worked in investment banking at Lehman Brothers becoming a partner at age 28, the youngest in the firm's history. In 1973, he was named president and head of investment banking and also head of the Investment Banking Division and Chairman of Lehman Corporation. In 1977, he moved to Boston and co-founded with Paul J. Ferri a venture capital firm, Hellman, Ferri Investment Associates (later renamed Matrix Partners), an early-stage investor in SanDisk and Apple. In 1984, he moved back to San Francisco and co-founded the buyout firm, Hellman & Friedman with Tully Friedman where he served as chairman of the firm as well as a member of the Firm's Investment and Compensation Committees.

Hellman & Friedman's strategy was to buy companies heavy on intellectual capital (typically financial services or software companies) and light on physical assets (such as manufacturers) with strong cash flows that needed operational improvements. In 1995, the firm purchased Levi Strauss & Co. from 250 family shareholders and consolidated it among four men including Hellman and then-CEO Robert D. Haas. The company reduced its debt and improved its earnings.

== Family history and philanthropy ==
Though his fortune was largely self-made, Hellman was the great-grandson of Isaias W. Hellman, a prominent early California banker (President of Wells Fargo Bank), philanthropist, and a founding father of the University of Southern California. Isaias Hellman's sister-in-law was married to Mayer Lehman, one of the founders of Lehman Brothers. Warren Hellman's mother, the former Ruth Koshland, was the granddaughter of Jesse Koshland, and great-granddaughter of Simon Koshland, pioneer wool merchants in San Francisco (a nephew of Jesse Koshland, Daniel E. Koshland Sr., served as the CEO of Levi Strauss & Co).

Hellman was married to Patricia Christina "Chris" Sander; they had four children: Frances Hellman, Patricia Hellman Gibbs, Marco "Mick" Hellman, and Judith Hellman. His funeral was held at Congregation Emanu-El in San Francisco. When he died in 2011, he was remembered by SFGate as "the San Francisco financier whose willingness to fund an unlikely range of passions made him a force in Bay Area politics, education and music," and as a "renaissance man."

=== Berkeley ===
The Hellman family's association with Berkeley dates back to 1888, when Hellman's grandfather, Isaias W. Hellman Jr., matriculated at Berkeley, graduating as a member of the university's twentieth class. His father, an investment banker, graduated from Berkeley in 1927 and from Harvard Business School in 1929. His grandaunts, Clara Hellman Heller and Florence Hellman Ehrman, endowed various Berkeley professorships and research committees; their husbands, Emanuel S. Heller and Sidney M. Ehrman, founders of the international law firm Heller Ehrman, were also Berkeley alumni. Berkeley's Hellman Tennis Complex is named in honor of his uncle, Isaias W. Hellman III, Class of 1920. Isaias Hellman was president of Wells Fargo and an active benefactor of the university, funding projects ranging from the Bancroft Library to the Alumni House and the former Barrows Hall.

Warren and Chris Hellman were also major Berkeley donors, contributing some $50 million either directly or through their charitable foundation. Among their many contributions were a $5 million gift in 1994 establishing the Hellman Fellows program to support junior faculty research, and a major joint gift in 2005 to support Cal's aquatics teams. The Hellman Foundation made a further $20 million endowment gift in 2018 to fund Berkeley's Hellman Fellows Program in perpetuity. From its inception in 1995 through 2018, Berkeley's Hellman Fellows Program supported 384 early-stage faculty members with awards of up to $50,000 for each fellow. Their foundation also supported various athletic programs, the Biology Scholars Program, the Lawrence Hall of Science, the Magnes Collection, the Blum Center, the Haas School of Business, and a host of undergraduate, graduate, and faculty initiatives.

Hellman's daughter, Frances Hellman, who holds a Ph.D. from Stanford, is professor of physics and Dean Emeritus of the Division of Mathematical and Physical Sciences at Berkeley. His daughter, Patricia Hellman Gibbs, M.D., the 2006 recipient of Berkeley's Public Health Heroes Award and a graduate of Williams and Yale School of Medicine, is the co-founder of the San Francisco Free Clinic. Hellman's son, Mick, an investment manager, like his father and grandfather, graduated from Berkeley, where he studied economics (Class of 1983), and from Harvard Business School. His daughter, Judith Hellman, M.D., who studied microbiology at Berkeley (Class of 1984) and medicine at Columbia, is the William L. Young Endowed Professor and Vice Chair for Research at the University of California, San Francisco. Five generations of the Hellman family have attended Berkeley.

== Other affiliations ==
Hellman served in the U.S. Army from 1955 through 1957.

An avid skier, Hellman co-founded Stratton Mountain School in 1972. As a supporter of the then U.S. Ski Educational Foundation, Hellman served both as a trustee and president of the U.S. Ski Team from the late ’70s to mid-’80s. Hellman won the national championship in Ride and Tie racing (in his age category) five times and competed in the western States Endurance Run, a 100-mile ultramarathon.

Hellman was the chair of the board of trustees for Mills College from 1982 to 1992, and as a result of protests reversed the college's decision to go co-ed in 1990.

Hellman was a Director of D.N.& E. Walter & Co. and Sugar Bowl Corporation. He was also a member of the advisory board of the Haas School of Business at Berkeley. In 1997, he was inducted into the American Academy of Achievement. In 2005, Hellman was inducted into the American Academy of Arts and Sciences.

Hellman and latterly the Hellman Trust Foundation is the primary sponsor and provided funding for the Hardly Strictly Bluegrass music festival in San Francisco's Golden Gate Park. In 2011, Speedway Meadow was renamed Hellman Hollow to honor his history of philanthropy and civic involvement in San Francisco.

Hellman was a donor and supporter of Jewish Vocational Services (JVS), a nonprofit organization that helps people transform their lives through work.

Hellman was the chairman of the Board of The Bay Citizen, a non-profit news organization focusing on the San Francisco Bay Area. The Bay Citizen was founded with a $5 million contribution from the Hellman Family Foundation.

He formerly served as a Director of numerous portfolio companies, including Eller Media Company, Nasdaq Stock Market, Young & Rubicam and Twentieth Century Fox Film Corporation.
