= Ozro W. Childs =

American politician

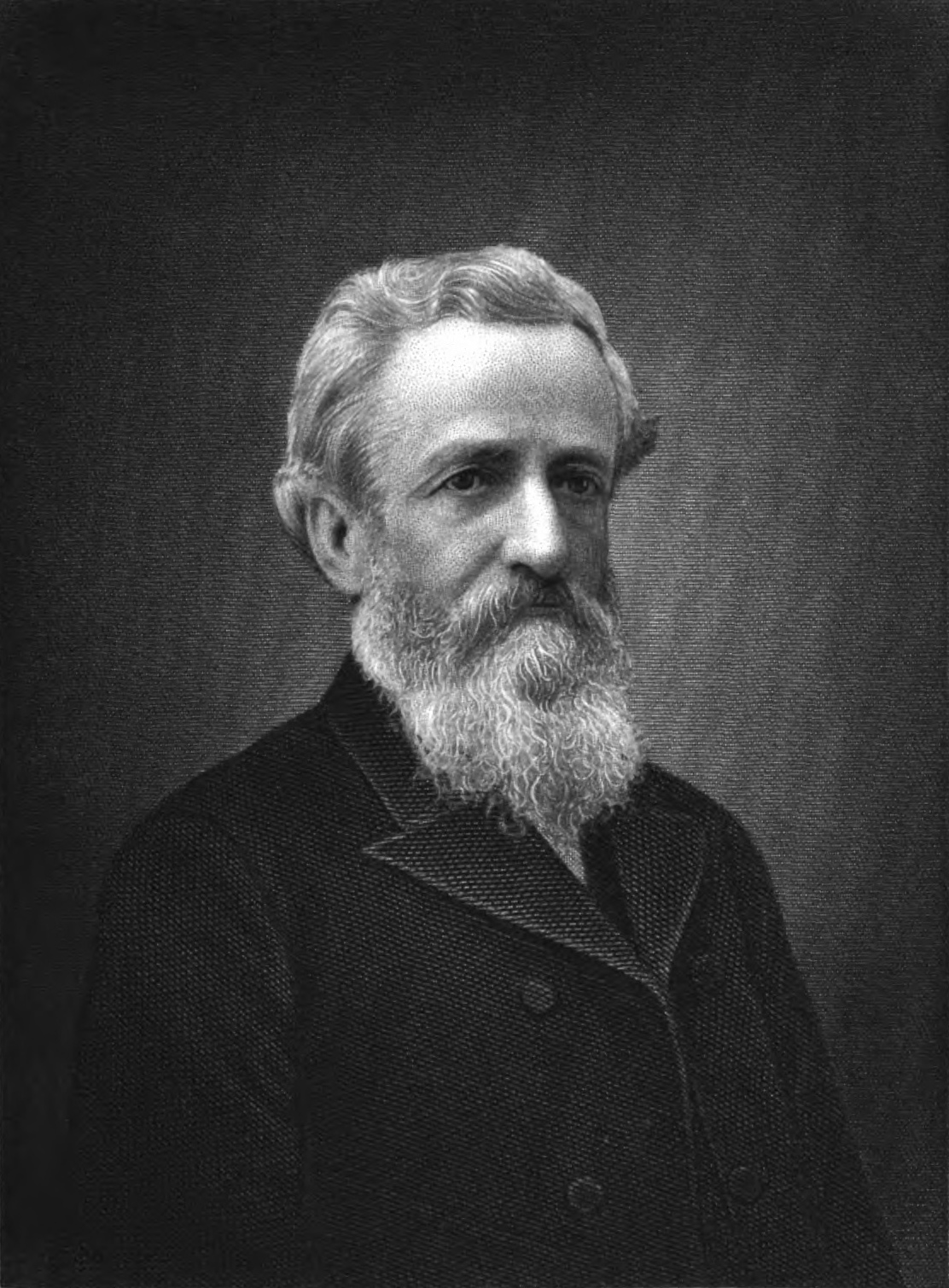
Ozro W. Childs

Ozro William Childs (June 3, 1824 – April 17, 1890) was a Protestant horticulturalist, merchant, and banker in the 19th century in Los Angeles, California. He was a founder of the University of Southern California.

== Early years ==
Ozro W. Childs was born in Sutton, Vermont, in 1824, and received his early education there. His father was a farmer, while one of his grandfathers was a town minister. Like many young people in Vermont, he left for the West, first for Ohio, where he earned his living as a schoolteacher. While there, he learned the tinsmith’s trade.

== Northern California ==
After the discovery of gold in California, he resolved to try his luck in the gold fields. He traveled down the Mississippi to New Orleans, and boarded a ship for Nicaragua; he crossed the Central American peninsula, where he and his fellow passengers endured great hardship, because the promised ship for California did not arrive.

After some delay, he took another ship, and arrived in San Francisco in August, 1850, where he set off for the mines. He was unaware that coastal Northern California is foggy in the winter and summer. The weather aggravated the asthma that eventually killed him. He and a man named Hicks took a ship south, arriving at the San Pedro Bay harbor.

== Southern California ==
Hicks and Childs walked from San Pedro to the small Pueblo de Los Angeles, and established a tinsmithing and hardware store. An existing merchant sold them his entire stock on credit. After a few years, Childs bought out his partner, and eventually left the trade with $40,000. Soon afterward, he contracted to build an extension of the Zanja Madre, a canal system to bring water to the fields south of the pueblo. He was paid in land in that area – all now within present day Downtown Los Angeles - from Sixth to Ninth, and Main to Figueroa Street.

This property was the foundation of his fortune. He built a substantial house at 10th and Main, then a half-mile from town center; on his property took up planting. In his day, Ozro Childs was Los Angeles’s most prominent plantsman, with a Plant nursery.

In July 1896, Childs and W.L. Hastings, both identified as "well-known society men" were in a "scrap" in front of the Hollenbeck Hotel. "Childs' face was covered with blood and Hastings' jaw was badly bruised," the Los Angeles Evening Express reported. "The fight arose out of some discussion over the sale of stocks."

=== Farmers and Merchants Bank ===
Ozro Childs invested, largely in land and commercial enterprises, often with Isaias W. Hellman as a partner. Their most significant and long-term success was the Farmers and Merchants Bank of Los Angeles, which included some of the town's most prominent citizens as additional investors. Their conservative lending practices allowed the bank to endure every panic and depression. The Farmers and Merchants Bank was bought by Security Pacific in 1956, and after various mergers it is now within Bank of America.

=== Grand Opera House ===
Childs opened the Grand Opera House in downtown Los Angeles in 1884. The theater sat 1,311 and was the largest in the city upon its opening.

=== University of Southern California ===
Childs was involved in philanthropic work. When Judge Robert Maclay Widney sought to create a university in Los Angeles in the 1870s, he received assistance from donors including Childs. In 1879, Childs contributed a considerable amount of land to the founding of the University of Southern California, which opened in 1880.

He died at his Los Angeles Main Street home in 1890, leaving six living children (out of ten) and a widow who survived him by over 40 years.

=== Los Angeles Common Council ===
Childs was elected to the Los Angeles Common Council, the governing body of the city, on December 6, 1869, and resigned on January 13, 1870.
