= Berkeleyside =

American digital newspaper

- Type: Online newspaper
- Founder(s): Lance Knobel, Frances Dinkelspiel, Tracey Taylor
- Publisher: Cityside Journalism Initiative
- President: Lance Knobel
- Editor: Zac Farber
- Founded: 2009; 17 years ago
- Headquarters: PO Box 70004, Oakland, California 94612
- City: Oakland, CA
- Website: www.berkeleyside.org

Berkeleyside is a digital newspaper founded in 2009. It covers life and politics in contemporary Berkeley, California, reporting on politics, schools, crime and business, as well as the food scene in the East Bay.

== Business ==
Berkeleyside has two main revenue sources: membership and advertising. For six years, from 2013 to 2018, it held an annual ideas festival, called Uncharted: the Berkeley Festival of Ideas.

In 2016, Berkeleyside became the first news site in the U.S. to launch a direct public offering, offering up to $800,000 in preferred stock to California residents. The direct public offering closed in 2018, after Berkeleyside raised $1 million from more than 350 readers. In 2017, Berkeleyside received a $60,000 grant from the Lenfest Institute to teach other news organizations how to launch a direct public offering.

== History ==
Berkeleyside was founded by Frances Dinkelspiel, Lance Knobel and Tracey Taylor in response to the cutbacks in local news that affected the Bay Area. All three worked as journalists before starting the site.

Berkeley is a city of 120,000 residents. Its culture and politics are heavily influenced by the presence of the University of California, Berkeley, campus in the center of the city. Berkeleyside takes as its premise the idea that Berkeley has had an outsized influence on the culture of the United States. Berkeleyside's coverage reflects the notion that Berkeley is a city of cutting-edge ideas and technologies that is frequently in the forefront of political discourse.

In 2019, the founders of Berkeleyside created a new 501(c)(3) organization called the Cityside Journalism Initiative to serve as the publisher of Berkeleyside. Cityside launched The Oaklandside for Oakland, California in March 2020 and Richmondside for Richmond, California in June 2024.

== Awards ==
Berkeleyside has received numerous awards for its reporting. In both 2013 and 2014, the Northern California Chapter of the Society of Professional Journalists gave Berkeleyside an Excellence in Journalism award for its community journalism. In 2016, the same organization gave Emilie Raguso, senior reporter, and Frances Dinkelspiel an award in explanatory journalism for their comprehensive coverage of homelessness in Berkeley. In 2017, SPJ NorCal named Emilie Raguso the “Journalist of the Year.”

In 2017, the San Francisco Press Club gave Berkeleyside first place in the digital media division for “Overall Excellence,” along with awards for breaking news, coverage of Berkeley's November 2016 election, and other stories.

== See also ==
- Institute for Nonprofit News (member)
