= Matrix Partners =

US-based venture capital investment firm

Matrix
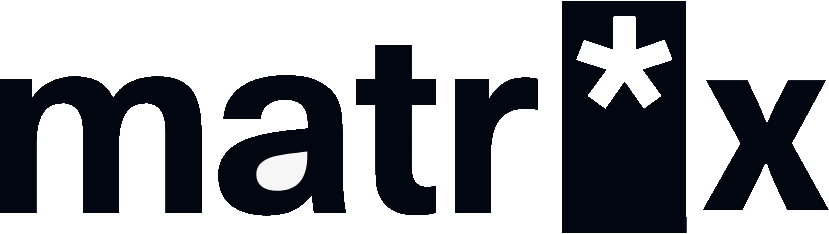
- Formerly: Matrix Partners
- Type: Private
- Industry: Venture capital
- Predecessor: Hellman Ferri Investment Associates (1977 to 1982)
- Founded: 1977
- Founder: Paul Ferri
- Headquarters: Palo Alto, California, US
- Number of employees: 2
- Subsidiaries: MPCi
- Website: matrix.vc

Matrix (formerly Matrix Partners) is a US-based venture capital investment firm. The firm invests in seed and early-stage tech companies in the United States, particularly in the software, AI, communications, semiconductors, data storage, Internet or wireless sectors.

The firm is headquartered in Cambridge, Massachusetts with an additional office in San Francisco, California.

== History ==
Founded in 1977, Matrix was an active player in the development of the venture capital industry in the 1980s. The firm's direct predecessor, Hellman Ferri Investment Associates (1977 to 1982), was founded by Paul J. Ferri and Warren Hellman. In 1982, Ferri and Hellman split ways and Ferri went to focus on early-stage companies, forming Matrix in Boston, Massachusetts while Hellman founded the San Francisco-based private equity firm, Hellman & Friedman which focused on later-stage firm investments.

Among the firm's notable investments, Matrix Partners was an early-stage investor in Apple Inc., Arrowpoint Communications, Digium, JBoss, JustFab, PSINet, SanDisk, Silverstream Software, TheLadders.com, Sonus Networks, Tivoli Software, Tollbridge Technologies, VERITAS Software, Vermeer Technologies Incorporated, and Xilinx.

In 1985, Matrix raised its first institutional private equity fund. In 2001, Matrix Partners completed fundraising for Matrix Partners VII, a $1 billion venture capital fund. In 2006, Matrix raised Matrix Partners VIII fund, with $445 million of investor commitments. In 2006, Matrix also raised a separate $150 million India fund. In July 2009, Matrix raised Matrix IX fund with $600 million. As of 2018, the firm has raised eleven U.S venture capital funds and five China focused funds. In November 2021, The Wall Street Journal reported that Matrix Partners is a major investor in Chinese semiconductor firms, raising U.S. national security concerns.

In July 2024, Matrix Partners announced a renaming and organizational update, with its Indian arm becoming DZ47 (with the brand name of Z47) and its Chinese arm becoming MPCi, while the U.S. operations will continue under the Matrix brand.

== Investments ==
In August 2023, the firm led a $3.5 million seed round for Wootz.work global sourcing platform for custom engineering equipment and solutions.

In May 2023, the firm's Indian arm extended its then current fund from $450 million to $525 million for the South Asian market.

In April 2024, AI platform SiftHub raised $5.5 million in a round led by Matrix Partners India and Blume Ventures.
