= Heller Ehrman =

Defunct international law firm

Heller Ehrman LLP
- Headquarters: San Francisco, California
- No. of offices: 13
- No. of attorneys: 730
- Major practice areas: General practice
- Revenue: $507 million USD (2006)
- Date founded: 1890
- Company type: Limited Liability Partnership
- Dissolved: November 28, 2008
- Website: www.hellerehrman.com

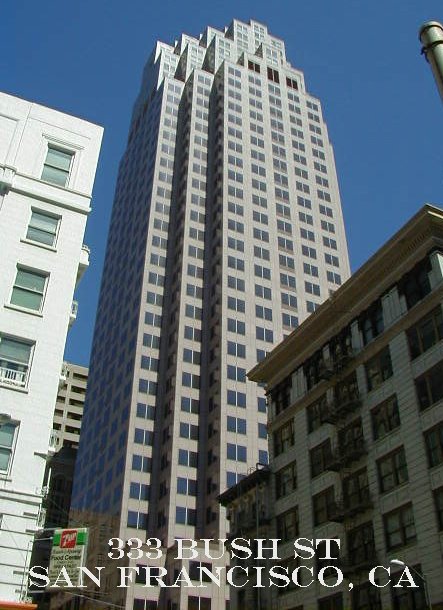
Heller Ehrman headquarters at 333 Bush St., San Francisco, CA

7 Times Square Tower, home of Heller Ehrman's New York City office

Heller Ehrman LLP was an international law firm of more than 730 attorneys in 15 offices in the United States, Europe, and Asia. Heller Ehrman was founded in San Francisco in 1890 and had additional offices located in most of the major financial centers around the world including New York City, Los Angeles, Washington, D.C., London, Beijing, Hong Kong and Singapore.

In September 2008, the firm encountered troubles after losing 15 intellectual property (IP) partners to Covington & Burling, which led to the collapse of merger talks with Mayer Brown on 14 September 2008. Including the above 15, a total of 50 partners had left the firm in 2008. One anonymous legal market expert said the exit of the IP partners could constitute a default in Heller’s line of credit with its bank, effectively triggering liquidation.

On September 25, 2008, the firm confirmed its dissolution would occur on November 28, 2008. The firm filed a voluntary petition for chapter 11 bankruptcy for protection in the United States Bankruptcy Court for the Northern District of California on December 28, 2008.

Following the firm's bankruptcy, the firm's trustee had a dispute with the firm's former partners as to whether the firm or the individual partners are entitled to revenue from client matters pending at the time of bankruptcy. The dispute reached the California Supreme Court in 2016.

== History and notable cases ==
Heller Ehrman had its beginning in 1890 when Emanuel S. Heller opened his law practice at 124 Sansome Street, Room 30, in San Francisco, California. Heller was a graduate of the University of California, Berkeley, received his law degree from the University of California, Hastings College of the Law and passed the California Bar in 1889. In 1891, he became the primary attorney of banker Isaias W. Hellman and moved his office to the headquarters of Hellman's Nevada Bank (Heller married Hellman's daughter in 1899). In 1896, Frank Hubbard Powers joined with Heller and the partnership name changed to Heller & Powers. In 1905, Sidney M. Ehrman (married to Isaias W. Hellman's other daughter Florence) and also a graduate of Berkeley (Class of 1896) and Hastings, entered into partnership with Heller and Powers, forming Heller Powers & Ehrman. In 1921, Jerome White and Florence McAuliffe joined the partnership after the death of Francis Powers, establishing the firm as Heller Ehrman White & McAuliffe LLP. The firm retained this name for more than 84 years until the name was shortened in 2005.

Between the years 1974 to 2007, Heller Ehrman realized an increase in business, causing the firm to branch out from the west coast with an additional 12 offices in locations ranging from London to Singapore. In 1986 the San Francisco headquarters was moved to a new skyscraper at 333 Bush Street. By 1991, the firm had 370 lawyers, over 3.5 times the number it had employed just ten years earlier.

In 1993, the first advertisement ever sold on the Internet was sold on the Global Network Navigator (now America On-Line) to Heller Ehrman LLP, and in 1994, Heller Ehrman launched the first law firm website.

By 2007, the firm had over 730 lawyers, over twice the number it employed just 15 years earlier. During the 2006 fiscal year it more than doubled its gross revenue from just 10 years earlier to a level just north of half a billion dollars.

1890: Emanuel S. Heller opens his law practice at 124 Sansome Street, Room 30, in San Francisco, California.

1906: Having withstood the San Francisco earthquake, the Heller family residence achieves a certain historical renown as it becomes the temporary headquarters for the firm's two major clients at the time: Wells Fargo Nevada National Bank and the Union Trust Company.

1921: Establishment of Heller Ehrman White & McAuliffe, with Sidney Ehrman entering the partnership in 1905 and Jerome White and Florence McAuliffe joining in 1921. The firm retains this name for more than 84 years.

1929: Florence McAuliffe negotiates the financing for the construction of the San Francisco–Oakland Bay Bridge.

1930: Sidney Ehrman acts as counsel in the formation of the consortium of contractors, Six Companies, Inc., created to build the Hoover Dam. The firm will go on to litigate several cases for the consortium.

1934: Firm successfully takes up on appeal what became a watershed case in Wells Fargo's history. The issue in McDuffie v. Wells Fargo Bank is whether the bank can apply the proceeds of four foreign bills of exchange to an indebtedness due from the Richfield Oil Company to the bank.

1937: Construction of the Golden Gate Bridge is completed. Jerome White serves as the Golden Gate Bridge District's General Counsel, arranging for the bonds to carry the project.

1959: Heller Ehrman takes long-time client Ampex Corporation public.

1960: Firm represents Consolidated Foods in a round of acquisitions, including Abbey Rents, Aris Gloves, Shasta Water Company and Sara Lee bakery products. Consolidated Foods will later change its name to Sara Lee Corporation.

1965: The antitrust case GTE Sylvania, Inc. v. Continental T.V., Inc. begins, eventually making its way to the U.S. Supreme Court in 1975, where the Court finds in favor of firm client GTE Sylvania. The case sets a precedent for applying the "rule of reason" to vertical business restraints.

1968: Heller Ehrman Shareholder Julian Stern negotiates with Syntex Corporation for the services of Dr. Alejandro Zaffaroni, along with concepts and technology that Syntex does not want to pursue and Dr. Zaffaroni does. Upon completion of negotiations, Stern helps to set up ALZA Corporation, which will go on to pioneer drug delivery systems for the pharmaceutical industry.

1969: Heller Ehrman attorneys take on Parisi v. Davidson pro bono. The case, successfully argued in the U.S. Supreme Court, defines the rights of conscientious objectors during the Vietnam War.

1971: Heller Ehrman takes Levi Strauss public and then structures the leveraged buyout when the company goes private in 1985.

1972: Firm helps to form Cetus Corporation, among the first of the biotechnology companies.

1974: Heller Ehrman opens its Silicon Valley office.

1976: Heller Ehrman defends client Arthur Young & Company in the cause celebre SEC v . Geotek, the U.S. Securities and Exchange Commission's (SEC) flagship case against the accounting profession.

1978: Heller Ehrman first opens an office in Hong Kong.

1979: Firm takes on an antitrust case for Levi Strauss & Company, in which Levi Strauss was charged with trying to control too tightly the price charged for its goods by retailers. The Federal Trade Commission first rejects a draft settlement by Heller Ehrman attorneys, but later is prepared to settle on the same terms after the U.S. Supreme Court hands down the Sylvania decision.

1983: Shareholder Steven Bomse begins work for Hoffman La Roche, representing them in a contretemps with the University of California relating to Interferon, a promising anti-cancer drug developed by Roche jointly with Genentech.

1983: Heller Ehrman opens its office in Seattle.

1993: Heller Ehrman's Hong Kong office re-established.

1985: Trial begins for the California Coordinated Asbestos Insurance Coverage Litigation, a gigantic case in which firm client Johns Manville's complaint against its insurers is joined with several other insurance coverage lawsuits. The case involves so many parties, the trial takes place in a specially constructed courtroom in the San Francisco Civic Center Auditorium.

1987: Heller Ehrman opens its Los Angeles office.

1988: Heller Ehrman successfully obtains an injunction forcing the government to place observers on tuna boats in order to protect the dolphin species under the terms of the Marine Mammal Protection Act.

1994: Heller Ehrman opens an office in Singapore.

1994: Heller Ehrman opens its Washington, D.C. office.

1994: Heller Ehrman launches first law firm website.

1999: Heller Ehrman opens its New York office with acquisition of Werbel & Carnelutti.

2001: Heller Ehrman represents ALZA in its $12 billion merger with pharmaceutical giant Johnson & Johnson. The firm had represented ALZA since its incorporation in 1968.

2002: In the first high-profile case involving stem cell research, attorneys represent the Wisconsin Alumni Research Foundation in a settlement with Geron Corporation that "could jump-start commercialization of stem cell research", according to The Wall Street Journal.

2002: Heller Ehrman negotiates an innovative settlement package for several related class action cases involved in the publicized "french fry" litigation on behalf of client McDonald's Corporation.

2003: Heller Ehrman represents Northrop Grumman Corporation in the $4.7 billion sale of TRW Automotive to The Blackstone Group. The transaction resulted in one of the largest leveraged buyouts in world history.

2003: Heller Ehrman's Hong Kong office adds 25 corporate attorneys from the Hong Kong law firm Siao, Wen and Leung.

2003: Heller Ehrman merges with Venture Law Group and expands its Silicon Valley presence to approximately 100 attorneys.

2003: The American Lawyer recognizes Heller Ehrman as one of the Top 20 "A-List" law firms in the U.S. The firm is again recognized in 2004 and 2005, one of only a handful of firms to make the list every year since its inception.

2004: Heller Ehrman opens its office in Beijing.

2004: Heller Ehrman adds 12 dispute resolution lawyers from the Hong Kong office of the London firm Denton Wilde Sapte.

2005: Heller Ehrman's FDA regulatory and patent teams, led by James Czaban (FDA law), and Joshua Rosenkranz (lead litigation counsel) receive a 9–0 decision in the U.S. Supreme Court on behalf of client Merck KGaA in Merck KGaA v. Integra LifeSciences, a case establishing a patent infringement safe harbor for biotechnology research in pursuit of FDA regulatory approval.

2007: Heller Ehrman opens offices in London and Shanghai.

2008: Heller Ehrman dissolves.

== Other cases and transactions ==
- One of the firm's pro bono cases occurred in Trafficante v. Metropolitan Life Insurance Company. The firm represented white plaintiffs against Metropolitan Life on behalf of minority residents because of the insurance company's alleged discrimination against the minorities in a San Francisco apartment. Both the U.S. District Court and the Ninth Circuit Court of Appeals said the white plaintiffs had no standing to sue because they themselves were not facing discrimination; however, in 1972 the U.S. Supreme Court issued a unanimous decision that the plaintiffs did indeed have standing to sue on behalf of the minority residents.
- Between 2002 and 2008, Heller aided in obtaining bipartisan support on the Equal Justice for Our Military Act of 2007 (HR 3174) and the Equal Justice for United States Military Personnel Act of 2007 (S.2052) pending in the 110th U.S. Congress. The U.S. House of Representatives held debate on September 27, 2008 and passed it by a two-thirds majority. The full Senate did not act upon HR 3174 and S.2052 before the end of the 110th Congress and the bills died.
