= Isaias W. Hellman =

American financier of German-Jewish descent

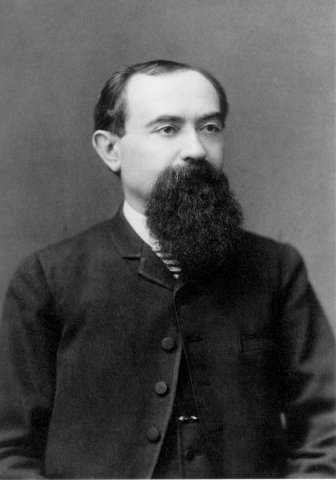

President of Wells Fargo Nevada National Bank
- In office 1905–1920
- Preceded by: Himself as president of the Nevada National Bank
- Succeeded by: Isaias W. Hellman Jr.

President of The Nevada National Bank
- In office 1898–1905
- Preceded by: Himself as president of the Nevada Bank
- Succeeded by: Himself as president of the Wells Fargo Nevada National Bank

President of The Nevada Bank
- In office 1890–1898
- Preceded by: John William Mackay
- Succeeded by: Himself as president of the Nevada National Bank

Personal details
- Born: Isaias Wolf Hellman; October 3, 1842 Reckendorf, Kingdom of Bavaria
- Died: April 9, 1920 (aged 77) San Francisco, California
- Resting place: Home of Peace Cemetery and Emanu-El Mausoleum
- Spouse: Esther Newgass (m. 1870)
- Relations: Herman W. Hellman (brother); Isaias W. Hellman III (grandson); Warren Hellman (great-grandson); Frances Hellman (great-great-granddaughter)
- Children: Isaias W. Hellman Jr. Clara Hellman; Florence Hellman

Isaias Wolf Hellman (October 3, 1842 – April 9, 1920) was a Kingdom of Bavaria-born American banker and philanthropist, and a founding father of the University of Southern California.

== Early life ==
Hellman was born in Reckendorf, Kingdom of Bavaria on October 3, 1842. He was one of three sons and four daughters, born to German Jewish parents Wolf Hellmann (1815–1884), a master weaver, and Sara Fleischmann (1823–1888). His siblings included brothers Herman and James W. Hellman. Their four sisters were Bertha, Flora, Regina, and Ernestine (who married a wealthy cattle merchant named Schloss).

He was educated in German public schools and at the College of Marktbreit in Bavaria. This school was founded by Solomon Wohl in 1849.

== Career ==
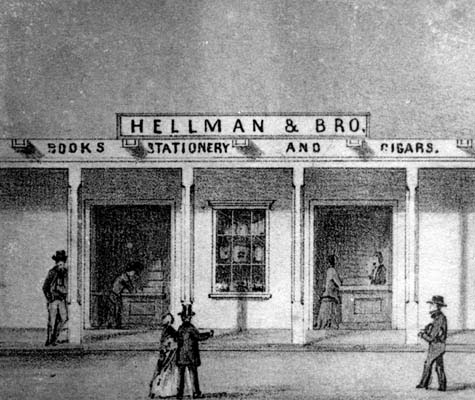
1857 Sketch of the Hellman & Bro. store where Isaias W. worked for his cousins

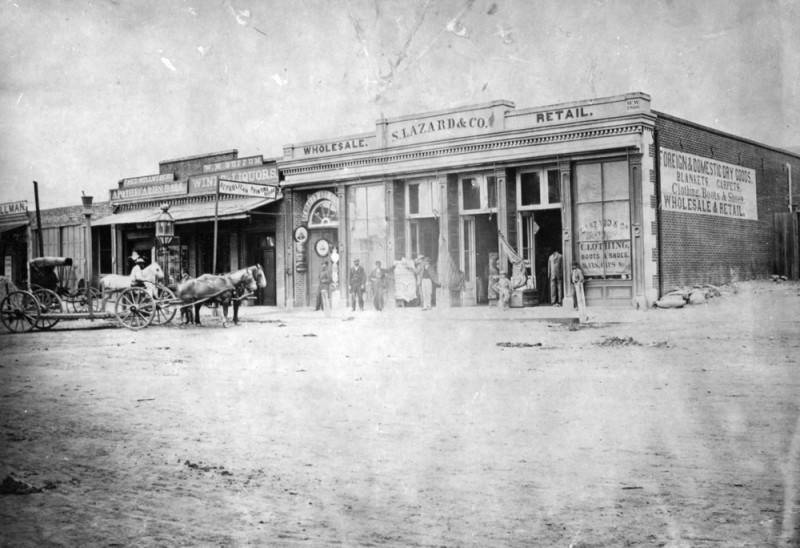
View in 1870 of the east side of Main Street, north of Commercial Street. At far left, on the corner of Main and Commercial, approximate location of the Triforium today, is the store that I. W. Hellman bought from Adolph Portugal in 1865 at age 22. At right is the S. Lazard & Co. foreign and domestic dry goods store, wholesale and retail, at 53.

Hellman and his brother Herman left Hamburg on the steamer Hammonia, arriving in Los Angeles, California, on May 14, 1859, to join their cousins. Their brother James later emigrated to Los Angeles as well. Isaias went to work as a clerk in his cousins' stationery and cigar store, and learned to speak Spanish. The store operated as Hellman and Bro. and sold cigars and stationery, and was located at the corner of Main and Temple streets. Isaias joined the business in 1855, brother Sam in 1857, and the partnership was dissolved January 26, 1862.

In 1865, Hellman bought the dry goods store of Adolph Portugal at the corner of Main and Commercial that Portugal had opened in 1854. This is approximately the current location of the Triforium sculpture on the Los Angeles Mall. Some sources state that he opened a dry goods store in April 1865 "on the Baker Block". The Baker Block did not open until 1875, however is one short city block north of Hellman's store at the southeast corner of Main and Commercial streets. In 1870, Hellman erected the Hellman Block at the northwest corner of Los Angeles Street and (a street that no longer exists) Commercial Street.

=== Banking ===
Hellman became Los Angeles' first banker almost by accident. As a courtesy, he stored his customers' gold and valuables in a safe. One day, Hellman got into an altercation with a drunk customer who had been coming in and out of the store, withdrawing gold each time from a pouch stored in the safe. When the man sobered up, he was angry to discover he had spent most of his funds, and lunged at Hellman. That interaction prompted Hellman to stop his informal banking operations. He obtained printed slips reading I.W. Hellman, Banker, and started buying people's funds and issuing deposit books.

On September 1, 1868, Hellman and Temple founded Hellman, Temple and Co., the fledgling city's second official bank. In 1871, Hellman and John G. Downey, a former governor of California, formed the Farmers and Merchants Bank of Los Angeles, which became Los Angeles' first successful bank. Hellman lent the money that allowed Harrison Gray Otis to buy the Los Angeles Times and Edward Doheny and Charles A. Canfield to drill for oil. In 1881, Hellman was appointed a Regents of the University of California to fill the unexpired term of D.O. Mills. He was reappointed twice and served until 1918. In 1905, he sold his home on Main St. to the bank and developed the Farmers & Merchants Bank Building and the Isaias W. Hellman Office Building on the site.

In 1890, Hellman moved to San Francisco to take over the Nevada Bank of San Francisco, which had been formed in 1875 by four men known as the Silver Kings: John William Mackay, James Cair Flood, William O'Brien and James Graham Fair. While the bank had once had $10 million in capitalization, it was nearly broke by the time Hellman took over. When word got out about Hellman's involvement, capitalists from around the world applied to buy stock. Hellman had $15 million in applications but only $2.5 million in stock to sell. Two of the biggest shareholders included Mayer Lehman of Lehman Brothers ($150,000) and Levi Strauss ($120,000). Other shareholders included men Hellman had grown up with in Reckendorf who had become important businessmen, including Kalman, Abraham and William Haas, and David Walter. Hellman served as president of the Nevada Bank of San Francisco from 1890 to 1898 when he nationalized the bank under the title of The Nevada National Bank of San Francisco. Hellman was president of that bank from 1898 to 1905, until he bought the banking division of Wells Fargo & Co., (Note: In 1905, Edward H. Harriman, who controlled the Southern Pacific Railroad and Union Pacific Railroad, had gained control of Wells Fargo and reached a deal with Hellman where Wells Fargo separated its banking and express operations, with Hellman's Nevada National buying the Wells Fargo Bank and Harriman retaining control of the express business. The Wells Fargo Nevada National Bank opened on April 22, 1905, with the following board of directors: Isaias W. Hellman, president; Isaias W. Hellman Jr. and F.A. Bigelow, vice presidents; Frederick L. Lipman, cashier; Frank B. King, George Grant, William McGavin, and John E. Miles, assistant cashiers; E.H. Harriman, William F. Herrin and Dudley Evans, directors. Levi Strauss joined the board in 1906.) and merged it with the Nevada National Bank to form the Wells Fargo Nevada National Bank with a working capital of $9,500,000. After the 1906 San Francisco earthquake, the bank was operated in the residence of Hellman's son-in-law at 2020 Jackson Street while the headquarters was rebuilt. At the height of his power, Hellman reportedly served as president or director of seventeen banks along the Pacific Coast and controlled $100 million in capital. Hellman served as president of the Wells Fargo Nevada National Bank until his death in 1920 when he was succeeded by his son, who died a month later, on May 10.

After his death, the Union Trust Company (which Hellman had incorporated in 1893) was merged into Wells Fargo Nevada National Bank in 1923 creating Wells Fargo & Union Trust Company. In 1954, Wells Fargo & Union Trust shortened its name to Wells Fargo Bank.

=== Streetcars and utilities ===
In 1870, Hellman's cousin Isaiah M. Hellman was elected city treasurer while Isaias became a major investor in trolley lines, contributing funds in 1874 to start the Main Street and Agricultural Park Railway, which traveled from the Plaza, the heart of Los Angeles's downtown, to Agricultural Park, a horse-racing track. Hellman eventually invested in many of the city's rail lines and with Henry Huntington formed the Los Angeles Railway in 1898 and the Pacific Electric Railway in 1901.

He was a major investor in Los Angeles's water, gas and electricity companies, and helped bring Southern Pacific Railroad to Los Angeles in 1876, which ended the isolation of the region.

=== Real estate ===
Hellman was a major landowner in Southern California. His holdings included numerous city lots and vast swaths of former rancho land. In 1871, he and a syndicate bought the 13,000-acre (53 km^{2}) Rancho Cucamonga. In 1881, Hellman and members of the Bixby family purchased the 26,000-acre (110 km^{2}) Rancho Los Alamitos (now home to Long Beach and Seal Beach). The Hellman neighborhood of Long Beach bears his name. He also purchased the Repetto Ranch (now Montebello) with Harris Newmark and Kaspare Cohn. Hellman and Downey also purchased swaths of Rancho San Pedro from the Dominguez family. Hellman owned much of Boyle Heights with William H. Workman.

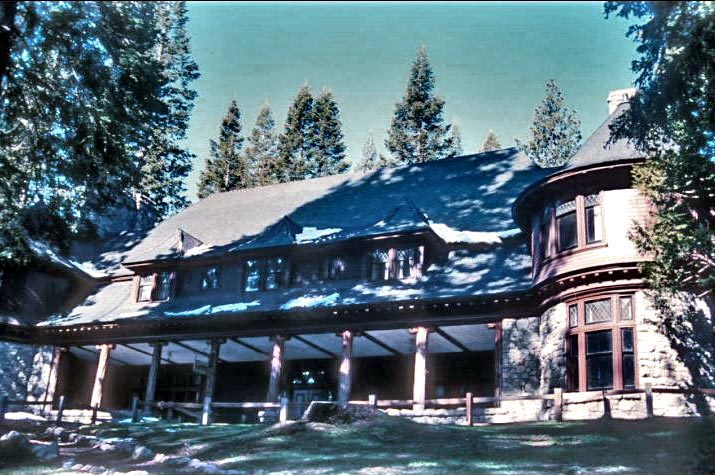
Hellman mansion on Lake Tahoe, now in the Ed Z'berg Sugar Pine Point State Park.

In 1897, Hellman bought a large parcel of land next to Lake Tahoe where he built a mansion in 1903. He named it Pine Lodge after the sugar pines on the property. His family later sold this land to the state of California, which made the property into Sugar Pine Point State Park.

He purchased the 35,000-acre (140 km^{2}) Nacimiento Ranch near Paso Robles and stocked it with cattle and horses.

=== University of Southern California ===
In 1879, Judge Robert Maclay Widney established a board of trustees to create a new university. Hellman joined the businessman Ozro W. Childs and the former Governor of California John G. Downey in donating valuable land and an endowment to found the University of Southern California.

== Personal life ==
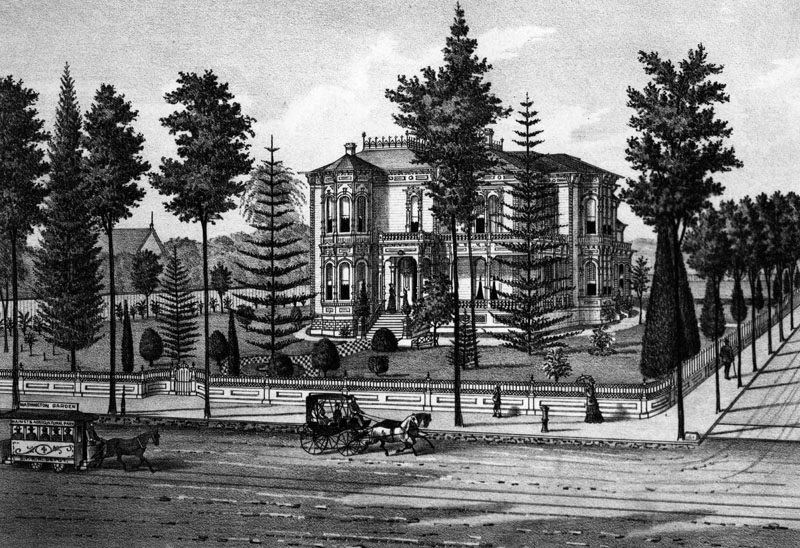
An 1887 lithograph of Hellman's Los Angeles home

On April 14, 1870, Hellman married Esther Newgass of New York. Her sister, Babetta Newgass, was the wife of Mayer Lehman, one of the three founding brothers of the investment bank Lehman Brothers. They had three children:

- Isaias W. Hellman Jr. (1871–1920), who married Frances Jacobi.
- Clara Hellman (1878–1959), who married Emanuel S. Heller in 1899.
- Florence Hellman (1882–1964), who married Sidney M. Ehrman who went on to form the law firm of Heller Powers & Ehrman.

He was president of B'nai B'rith in 1872 when the congregation built the city's first temple on Fort Street.

Hellman died in San Francisco on April 9, 1920.

=== Legacy ===
At his death in 1920, Hellman was considered the leading financier of the Pacific Coast. His son, Isaias Wolf Hellman, Jr. and grandson, Isaias Warren Hellman, later became presidents of Wells Fargo Bank. The Union Trust Company was merged with Wells Fargo after his death and the original Farmers and Merchants Bank of Los Angeles later merged with Security First National Bank of Los Angeles.

Biographies of Hellman include Towers of Gold: How One Jewish Immigrant Named Isaias Hellman Created California, by Frances Dinkelspiel, his great-great-granddaughter. The 2008 book was on the San Francisco Chronicle bestseller list for five weeks and was reviewed favorably in the publication.
