= Farmers and Merchants Bank of Los Angeles =

- U.S. Historic district – Contributing property
- Los Angeles Historic-Cultural Monument
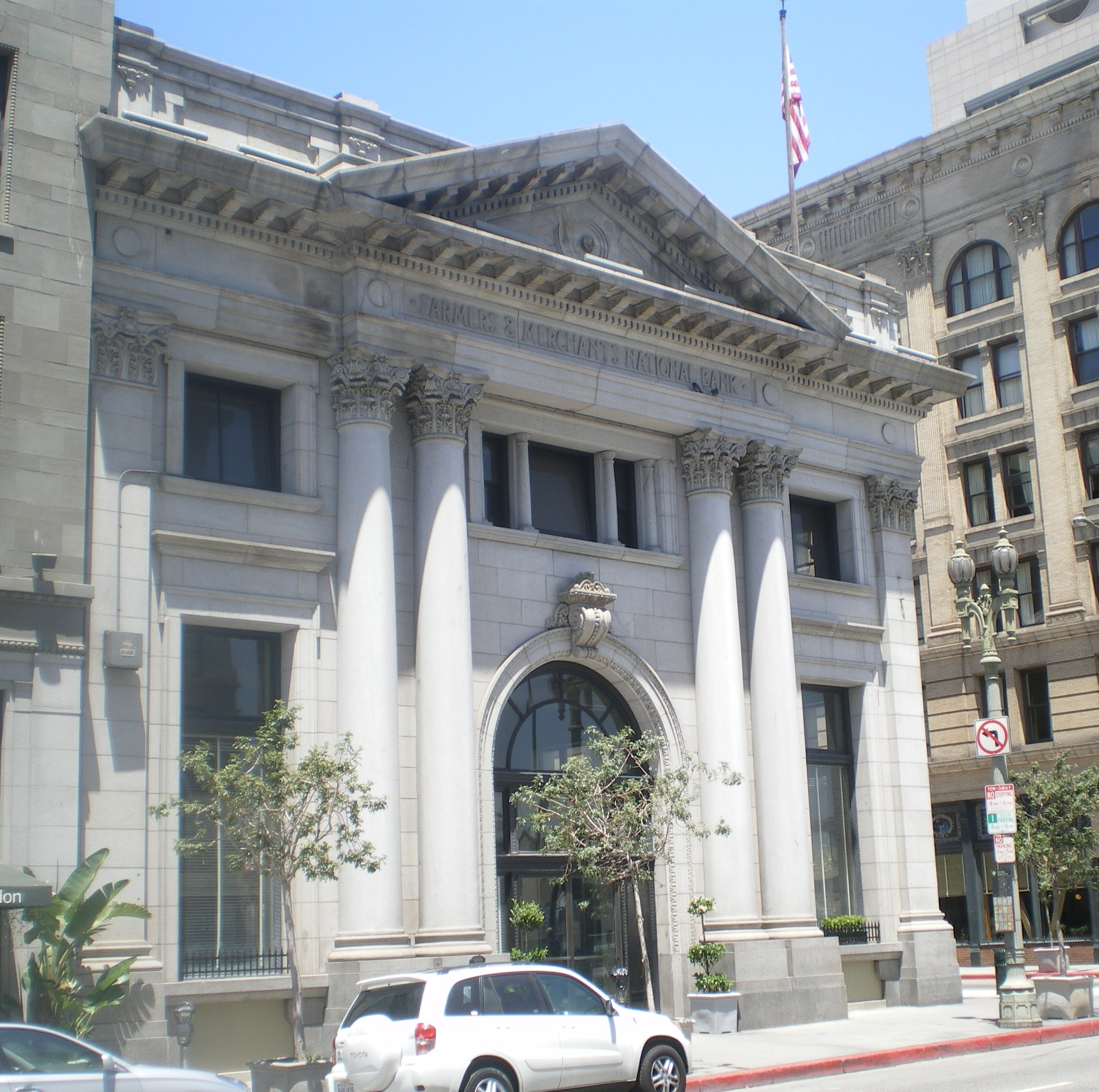
- The building in 2008

- Location within the Los Angeles metropolitan area
- Location: 401 South Main Street, Los Angeles, California, United States
- Coordinates: 34.0483°N 118.2476°W
- Built: 1905
- Architectural style: Classical Revival
- Part of: Spring Street Financial District (ID00000387)
- LAHCM No.: 271

Significant dates
- Designated CP: April 21, 2000
- Designated LAHCM: August 9, 1983

Farmers and Merchants Bank (F&M) was a lending institution (1871−1952) based in Downtown Los Angeles, California. It is recognized both for its architecture and its pivotal role in the economic development of early Los Angeles.

== Institutional history ==
The Farmers and Merchants Bank, the first incorporated bank in Los Angeles, was founded in 1871 by 23 prominent Los Angeles businessmen, with an initial capital of $500,000. The three largest subscribers—financier Isaias W. Hellman ($100,000), former California Governor John G. Downey ($100,000), and Ozro W. Childs ($50,000)—later founded the University of Southern California. Other investors included Charles Ducommun ($25,000), I.M. Hellman ($20,000), and Jose Mascarel ($10,000). Its original location was at the Pico Building, on Main Street, between what is now US 101 and Temple, roughly at the site of the Triforium.

The bank built and moved into new offices designed by architect Ezra F. Kysor in 1874 across the street from the Pico Building. The Los Angeles National Bank moved into its facilities in the Pico Building. In 1883 the F&M Bank moved again, to the southeast corner of Main and Commercial streets.

I.W. Hellman was a cautious lender, insisting that major borrowers have good character and provide good security. Its subsequent presidents, J.A. Graves (who had been Hellman's attorney) and Victor H. Rosetti, continued Hellman's conservative practices, with a large portion of the bank's capital constantly held in Treasury securities. As a result, the Bank survived every economic panic period, from the Panic of 1873, Panic of 1893, and Panic of 1896, through the Great Depression.

The building at 4th and Main in 1923

A one-branch downtown bank was eventually seen as not likely to continue to grow. In 1956, it merged with Security First National Bank, which became in later years Security Pacific National Bank, and ultimately was acquired by the Bank of America.

== Building ==
Built in 1905, the bank was designed by the firm of Morgan and Walls. Designed in the Classical Revival style, the building is one of Southern California's finest examples of the early "temples of finance" which were popular at the turn of the century. Its two-story facade, reminiscent of a Roman temple, is punctuated by an entrance framed with Corinthian columns topped by a large triangular pediment.

The Farmers & Merchants Bank building has been established as Los Angeles Historic-Cultural Monument #271.

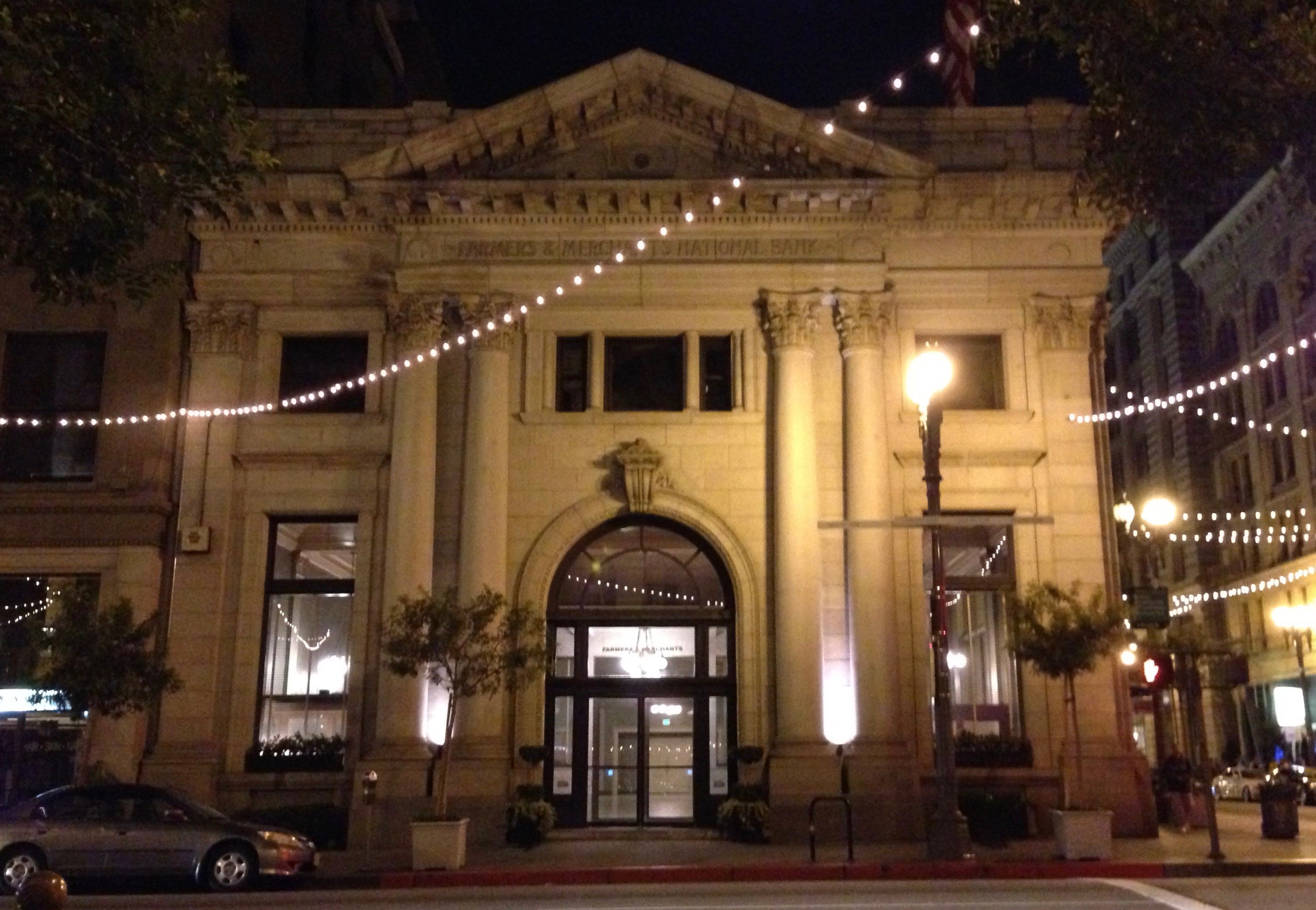
The facade of the building at night in 2014

Much of the original banking room remains, including light fixtures, a central skylight, and the loggia with its Victorian-style railings. Operating as a bank until its closure in the late 80s, the building now functions primarily as a special events and banquet facility and film location. The building was renovated by developer Tom Gilmore and Associates.

== See also ==
- Farmers and Merchants Bank of Los Angeles people
- List of contributing properties in the Spring Street Financial District
