= List of defunct law firms =

This is a list of defunct law firms. For list of current law firms, see list of law firms.

== Canada ==
A

- Armstrong Perkins Hudson LLP

F

- Fraser Milner Casgrain

G

- Goodman and Carr
- Gowlings

H

- Heenan Blaikie
- Holden Day Wilson

L

- Lang Michener

O

- Ogilvy Renault

== United Kingdom ==
A

- ACS:Law
- Addleshaw Booth & Co

B

- Barlow Lyde & Gilbert

C

- Cobbetts

D

- Davenport Lyons
- Denton Wilde Sapte
- Dickinson Dees

G

- Theodore Goddard

H

- Halliwells
- Hammonds
- Herbert Smith

M

- McGrigors

S

- Semple Fraser
- SNR Denton

== United States ==
A

- Altheimer & Gray
- Arter & Hadden

B

- Baker & Daniels
- Bingham McCutchen
- Brobeck, Phleger & Harrison
- Brown & Wood

C

- Community Rights Counsel
- Coudert Brothers

D

- Dewey & LeBoeuf
- Dewey Ballantine
- Dickstein Shapiro
- Donovan, Leisure, Newton & Irvine
- Dow Lohnes

E

- Eaton Peabody

F

- Faegre & Benson
- Finley, Kumble, Wagner, Underberg, Manley, Myerson & Casey

G

- Gardner Carton & Douglas
- Graham & James

H

- Hall Dickler Kent Goldstein & Wood
- Halleck, Peachy & Billings
- Heller Ehrman
- Hill and Barlow
- Hopkins & Sutter
- Howe and Hummel
- Howrey

I

- Isham Lincoln & Beale

J

- Jenkens & Gilchrist

K

- Katten Muchin & Zavis
- Keck, Mahin & Cate

L

- LeBoeuf, Lamb, Greene & MacRae
- Lindquist & Vennum
- Lord Day & Lord
- Lyon & Lyon

M

- Mudge Rose Guthrie Alexander & Ferdon
- Myerson & Kuhn

P

- Parker Chapin Flattau & Klimpl
- Pennie & Edmonds
- Preston Gates & Ellis

R

- Rider Bennett
- Robinson, Silverman, Pearce, Aronsohn, and Berman
- Rogers & Wells
- Rosenman & Colin

S

- Shea & Gardner
- Shea & Gould
- Sonnenschein Nath & Rosenthal
- Squadron, Ellenoff, Plesent & Sheinfeld
- Steven J. Baum P.C.
- Swidler Berlin Shereff Friedman

T

- Testa, Hurwitz & Thibeault
- Thacher Proffitt & Wood
- Thelen LLP
- Tillinghast Licht
- Trevor Law Group

W

- Waesche, Sheinbaum & O'Regan
- Walter, Conston, Alexander & Green
- Washington, Perito & Dubuc
- Webster & Sheffield
- Winthrop, Stimson, Putnam & Roberts
- WolfBlock
