= Boutique law firm =

Firm specializing in a niche area of law practice

A boutique law firm is a law firm specializing in a niche area of law practice. Unlike general practice law firms that include various unrelated practice areas within a single firm, a boutique firm specializes in one or a select few practice areas. There may be some confusion as legal publications refer to any small- or mid-sized firm as a boutique, though firms with fewer than 100 attorneys generally count. Boutique should apply to those firms that focus on particular areas, regardless of size, though they are typically smaller, except for a few firms such as Finnegan, Henderson, Farabow, Garrett & Dunner or Fish & Richardson with over 400 attorneys.

== History ==
=== United States ===
In the 1980s, American mid-size law firms began losing ground due to consolidation in the legal market. They have been the primary means by which larger law firms from regional centers expanded in key new markets such as New York City. For example, Atlanta-based Alston & Bird acquired 50-lawyer German-focused corporate boutique Walter, Conston, Alexander & Green, P.C. in 2001. The same year, Boston-based legacy firm Bingham Dana & Gould (now known as Bingham McCutchen) merged with boutique litigation shop Richards & O'Neill and Dallas-based Jenkens & Gilchrist absorbed Parker Chapin Flattau & Klimpl. In 2007, Texas firm Vinson & Elkins acquired Cronin & Vris, a small bankruptcy boutique.

The pendulum began to swing back away from consolidation toward the formation of smaller boutique firms with the downturn of the economy in late 2008 and early 2009 as recession-proof niche practices began to separate themselves from the struggling behemoths. For example, Washington, D.C.–based Hausfeld LLP spun out of Cohen Milstein and Birmingham, Alabama–based Frohsin & Barger, LLC spun out of the southern regional firm Baker Donelson. Both Hausfeld and Frohsin & Barger have been cited as examples by The National Law Journal as "somewhat recession-proof" boutiques. Other boutiques, such as Waesche, Sheinbaum & O'Regan, have dissolved.

Boutique law firms have maintained their competitive edge in a number of fields. Firms like Seattle-based Harris & Moure remain a competitive force in the international law practice. The complexities of intellectual property, especially patent law, have made IP boutiques still competitive, including Fish & Richardson, Finnegan, Henderson, Farabow, Garrett & Dunner, Oblon, Spivak, Schwegman, Lundberg & Woessner, and Wood, Herron & Evans, although New York City IP boutiques Pennie & Edmonds largely joined Jones Day, Fish & Neave merged with Boston-based Ropes & Gray, and a number of Morgan & Finnegan lawyers joined Texas-based Locke Lord Bissell & Liddell. Additionally, Alexandria-based IP boutique Burns, Doane, Swecker & Mathis merged with Pittsburgh-based Buchanan, Ingersoll & Rooney in 2005, Cushman, Darby & Cushman was absorbed by national firm Pillsbury Winthrop Shaw Pittman (then Pillsbury, Madison & Sutro), Houston-based Arnold, White & Durkee merged with Howrey (then Howrey & Simon), Los Angeles–based Lyon & Lyon dissolved in 2002, and Silicon Valley boutique Skjerven Morrill & MacPherson LLP dissolved in 2003.

Litigation and corporate boutique law firms based in Europe include Oppenhoff & Partner.

== Major boutique firms by specialty ==
=== Intellectual property ===
- Finnegan, Henderson, Farabow, Garrett & Dunner (Washington, D.C.)
- Fish & Richardson (Boston)
- Oblon (Alexandria, Virginia)

=== Labor and employment ===
- Jackson Lewis (White Plains, New York)
- Littler Mendelson (San Francisco)
- Seyfarth Shaw (Chicago)

=== Litigation ===
- Boies, Schiller & Flexner (New York City)
- Irell & Manella (Los Angeles)
- Kasowitz, Benson, Torres & Friedman (New York City)
- Quinn Emanuel Urquhart & Sullivan (Los Angeles)
- Williams & Connolly (Washington, D.C.)

=== Maritime ===
- Freehill Hogan & Mahar (New York City)
- Seward & Kissel (New York City & Washington, D.C.)

=== Technology and venture capital ===
- Cooley LLP (Palo Alto)
- Fenwick & West (Mountain View)
- Wilson Sonsini Goodrich & Rosati (Palo Alto)
- Gunderson Dettmer Stough Villeneuve Franklin & Hachigian (Redwood City)
- Reitler Kailas & Rosenblatt (New York City)

== See also ==
- Boutique investment bank
