= Lerner, David, Littenberg, Krumholz & Mentlik =

American intellectual property law firm

Lerner David LLP
- Headquarters: Cranford, New Jersey United States
- No. of offices: 3 (United States) (Japan)
- No. of attorneys: 50+
- No. of employees: 130+
- Major practice areas: Intellectual Property
- Key people: Keith E. Gilman (Managing Partner)
- Date founded: 1969; 57 years ago
- Company type: Limited Liability Partnership
- Website: lernerdavid.com

Lerner David LLP is an American intellectual property boutique law firm with offices in the United States, China and Japan. It specializes in intellectual property (IP) disciplines including, among them, patents, trademarks, copyrights, Internet law and trade secrets.

Founded in 1969, the firm provides legal advice to clients on intellectual property litigation, patent procurement, licensing, mergers and acquisitions, due diligence and asset management issues.

== History ==
In 1969, Larry Lerner, Sid David and Joe Littenberg founded Lerner, David & Littenberg in Newark, New Jersey. The firm moved from Newark to Westfield, New Jersey in 1973 and from 1975 until 1983 it operated under the name Lerner, David, Littenberg and Samuel. In October 2019, the firm moved its main office to Cranford, New Jersey. In 1983, the firm became Lerner, David, Littenberg, Krumholz & Mentilk LLP.

In 2010, Lerner David opened offices in Guangzhou, China. The firm was the first American intellectual property law firm located in the Pearl River Delta. Licensed by the Chinese Ministry of Justice, the firm's Guangzhou office counsels Asian companies and law firms on intellectual property matters in the United States, and American companies on intellectual property matters in China.

In 2013, Lerner David opened office in Tokyo, Japan.

== Recognition ==
The New Jersey Law Journal (NJLJ) has named the firm Litigation Department of the Year for Intellectual Property in 2022, 2021, 2020, 2019, 2018, 2017, and 2015.

U.S. News-Best Law Firms ranked the firm a Tier One in New Jersey for Intellectual Property-Litigation, Litigation-Patent, Patent Law, and Trademark Law in 2023, continuing a decade-plus streak atop this survey.

IAM Patent 1000: The World’s Leading Patent Professionals named the firm a Gold (top) firm in New Jersey in 2022, continuing a decade-long atop this survey.

The firm is listed by “Super Lawyers” magazine and “Chambers and Partners” as a top IP law firm in New Jersey.

== Notable Cases ==
Lerner David represented Gordon Gould in establishing the validity of his patented inventions.This effort was led by former partner, Richard Irving Samuel Gould is best known for his thirty-year fight with the United States Patent and Trademark Office to obtain patents for his laser and related technologies. In subsequent court cases, the firm won victories for Gould in enforcing his patent rights against laser manufactures.

== Practice Areas ==
- Litigation
- Licensing
- Merger and Acquisition Due Diligence
- Clearance Opinions and Patent Studies
- ANDA, Biosimilar and New Drug Advice
- Patent Procurement in the U.S.
- International Patent Procurement
- Patent Reexamination, Reissue and Opposition
- Risk Management
- IP Asset and Portfolio Management
- Copyrights
- Trademark and Trade Dress Procurement in the U.S.
- International Trademark Procurement
- Trade Secrets
- Internet Law
- ITC Litigation
