= Brittany K. Barnett =

American attorney and criminal justice reform advocate

- Born: Brittany K. Byrd
- Education: University of Texas at Arlington (BA); Southern Methodist University (JD)
- Occupation: Lawyer
- Organization: Buried Alive
- Website: brittanykbarnett.com

Brittany K. Barnett (formerly Byrd) is an American attorney and criminal justice reform advocate. Through the organization Buried Alive, which she co-founded with Sharanda Jones and Corey Jacobs, she came to national attention when she and her co-counsel, MiAngel Cody, litigated the release of 17 people in 90 days. Her organization has received funding and endorsement from television personality Kim Kardashian. Barnett is also the founder of Girls Embracing Mothers, a non-profit organization that provides support for girls with mothers in prison.

== Early life and education ==
Barnett is from Texas. She grew up in an environment close to drug culture.

Barnett attended The University of Texas at Arlington, earning a bachelor's degree in 2005 and a master's degree in 2006 in accounting. When Barnett was 22, her mother was sentenced to eight years for failing a series of drug tests while on probation. Barnett credits her mother's own incarceration with teaching her that persons in prison were often treated as "unworthy of any compassion or concern." After graduation, she worked for accounting firm PricewaterhouseCoopers as a CPA, and studied for her LSAT. She then went to Winstead PC in the Finance & Banking Practice Group.

She received her Juris Doctor degree from Southern Methodist University Dedman School of Law. While in law school, Barnett completed internships with the Honorable Nancy F. Atlas in the U.S. District Court for the Southern District of Texas and with the Honorable Reneé H. Toliver in the U.S. District Court for the Northern District of Texas. While researching a paper on how race impacted sentencing for her Critical Race Theory class, she came across the case of Sharanda Jones, a woman who had been sentenced to life without parole for a first-time, non-violent drug offense. After submitting her paper, Jones's case plagued Barnett, and she wrote to Jones offering her assistance; the women began corresponding through email. She later came across the similar case of Donal Clark, who was serving a 30-year sentence for a first-time, non-violent drug offense.

== Career ==
In 2016, she stopped practicing corporate law and began to take the cases of nonviolent drug offenders full-time, taking advantage of a policy under President Barack Obama's administration that came to be known as the clemency initiative.

Barnett is the founder of Buried Alive, a criminal justice reform advocacy organization that she co-founded with former clients Sharanda Jones and Corey Jacobs. The organization seeks to eliminate life without parole as a sentence for non-violent drug offenses. Barnett is also the founder of Girls Embracing Mothers, a non-profit organization that provides support for girls with mothers in prison. she is a Practitioner-in-Residence at Southern Methodist University's Deason Family Criminal Justice Reform Center. The graduate students provide research and work on the individual cases. The center provides funding and training to Buried Alive. She is also a board member of the ORIX Foundation.

In early 2019, Barnett and MiAngel Cody (founder of and lead counsel for The Decarceration Collective law office & consultancy) started the 90 Days to Freedom campaign, a push to release nonviolent drug offenders from life sentences. The effort resulted in 17 persons being released under provisions of the First Step Act. The campaign was largely funded by Kardashian West, and she was widely credited for the success of the campaign in media headlines. Commentary on her involvement ranged from praise, to assertions that it was a public relations stunt, to accusations that she was taking the credit for work she did not do. By September 2020, Barnett and Cody had successfully litigated over 40 cases for early release.

Miss USA 2019, Cheslie Kryst, was a complex litigation attorney. Following her win, she partnered with Barnett in representing and successfully litigating the release of Alfred Rivera after serving 18 years of a life sentence for non-violent drug offenses. Her stepdad (also an attorney) had previously worked with Barnett to release someone who had been imprisoned for 18 years.

Barnett started XVI Capital Partners, a venture capital fund to help fund entrepreneurial ideas the previous inmates have upon release, with the goal of what she calls "economic liberation" from the draw of selling drugs.

On June 19, 2019, Barnett and Cody launched the Third Strike Project, which focuses on a separate provision of the First Step Act that allows inmates convicted in crack cocaine cases to retroactively be eligible for consideration to receive reduced sentences. On August 29, 2019, rapper Pusha T released the song "Coming Home" with singer Lauryn Hill to bring awareness to the Third Strike Project. He made a $25,000 donation to launch the campaign.

Barnett's book A Knock at Midnight: A Story of Hope, Justice, and Freedom was released on September 8, 2020. Sierra Crane Murdoch of The New York Times said the book "unfurls like a coming-of-age story," but said that "her depictions of her mother are flat, distant." USA Today included it on its list of 5 books not to miss for the week of September 5, 2020.

== Notable cases ==
Multiple clients of Barnett took advantage of the clemency initiative President Obama and former Attorney General Eric Holder began in 2014. As a liaison between a cocaine dealer and a supplier, Sharanda Jones was charged with "drug conspiracy" in August 1999. The witnesses in her trial consisted of fellow drug offenders who testified in exchange for lighter sentences. Policies at the time allowed the judge to add "enhancements" to her sentence, including her legal license to carry a concealed weapon credited as "furtherance of drug conspiracy," her testimony in her own defense credited as "obstruction of justice," and weight conversion of powder cocaine to crack cocaine (which carried higher sentences). U.S. District Judge Jorge Solis ultimately calculated her sentence to be 46 years without parole, effectively a life sentence.

Corey Jacobs was 47 years old and 17 years into a life sentence for a first-time drug charge when Obama granted him clemency. The sentencing judge in the case, Judge Henry Coke Morgan Jr., wrote a letter advocating for Jacobs's petition for clemency, explaining that he would not have handed down a life sentence if he had not been required to do so by law. In response to the decision, Barnett said "The president’s mercy and belief in redemption literally saved Corey’s life."

Trenton Copeland was profiled in Rolling Stone magazine for his petition for clemency to President Obama after receiving a life sentence for three nonviolent drug offenses. Copeland was one of 330 commutations the president granted on his last day in office. In response, Barnett said, "I was overjoyed when I received the call from Pardon Attorney Robert Zauzmer telling me the President had granted clemency to my client, Trenton Copeland, who was being buried alive under an unduly harsh sentence of life without parole for a nonviolent drug offense. The President saved Trenton’s life today."

Barnett was on the legal team of Alice Marie Johnson, a woman who was serving the 21st year a life sentence for nonviolent drug offenses. The Obama administration denied her petition for clemency in January 2017, however, after separate meetings with Kardashian West and her husband, Kanye West, President Donald Trump commuted Johnson's sentence. The White House released a statement, saying "While this Administration will always be very tough on crime, it believes that those who have paid their debt to society and worked hard to better themselves while in prison deserve a second chance." The case led to Trump's support of the First Step Act, which, among other things, retroactively applies the Fair Sentencing Act and increases the number of good conduct time credits prisoners receive.

== Personal life ==
Barnett lives in Dallas, Texas.

== Bibliography ==
- Barnett, Brittany K. (July 11, 2017). "My Experience with Clemency and the Power of Hope". Federal Sentencing Reporter. 29 (5): 252–254. doi:10.1525/fsr.2017.29.5.252.
- Barnett, Brittany K. (September 8, 2020). A Knock at Midnight: A Story of Hope, Justice, and Freedom. Crown. ISBN 978-1-9848-2579-7.

== See also ==
- Kathleen Zellner
- The New Jim Crow
- Sentencing Project
- Celebrity endorsement
