= OnRamp Fellowship =

- Industry: Recruitment
- Founded: 2014
- Founder: Caren Ulrich Stacy
- Website: onrampfellowship.com

OnRamp Fellowship is a re-entry platform which matches attorneys returning to work in the legal and financial services field. The fellowship program works with over 30 law firms and nine legal departments. Over 85 fellows have been placed at organizations to date in locations around the U.S.

== History ==
OnRamp was founded by Caren Ulrich Stacy in 2014 to give attorneys re-entering the legal profession a paid fellowship with a law firm or legal department. The founding law firms of the OnRamp Fellowship are Sidley Austin, Cooley LLP, Baker Botts, and Hogan Lovells.

== Program ==
Attorneys returning to the workforce after an extended hiatus are matched with a law firm or legal department that meets their needs. The program includes a yearly salary for a fellowship that can last up to a year with the possibility of being hired by the company when the fellowship ends. OnRamp also gives fellows unlimited access to continuing education services online, training from business development experts, and access to a career coach. In order to apply to the program, participants must have at least three years of legal experience and have been on hiatus for at least two years.
