= New York's 68th State Assembly district =

American legislative district

Assemblymember
| Edward Gibbs; D–Harlem |

New York's 68th State Assembly district is one of the 150 districts in the New York State Assembly. It has been represented by Democrat Edward Gibbs following a special election in January 2022 to replace former Assembly member Robert J. Rodriguez upon his appointment as New York Secretary of State.

== Geography ==
District 68 is located in northeastern Manhattan, comprising the neighborhood of East Harlem, as well as a small portion of Central Harlem and the Upper East Side. This district also contains Randalls and Wards Islands.

The district (partially) overlaps with New York's 12th and 13th congressional districts, as well as the 28th, 29th and 30th districts of the New York State Senate, and the 5th, 6th, 8th and 9th districts of the New York City Council.

== Recent election results ==
=== 2026 ===
2026 New York State Assembly election, District 68
Primary election
| Party | Candidate | Votes | % |
|---|---|---|---|
| Democratic | Diana Ayala | 5,759 | 51.9 |
| Democratic | Eddie Gibbs (incumbent) | 3,453 | 31.1 |
| Democratic | Tamika Mapp | 1,273 | 11.5 |
| Democratic | William Smith | 564 | 5.1 |
| Write-in | | 40 | 0.4 |
| Total votes | | 11,089 | 100.0 |
General election
| Democratic | Diana Ayala | | |
| Working Families | Diana Ayala | | |
| Total | Diana Ayala | | |
| Write-in | | | |
| Total votes | | | 100.0 |

=== 2024 ===
2024 New York State Assembly election, District 68
Primary election
| Party | Candidate | Votes | % |
|---|---|---|---|
| Democratic | Eddie Gibbs (incumbent) | 2,450 | 42.4 |
| Democratic | Xavier Santiago | 1,932 | 33.4 |
| Democratic | Tamika Mapp | 989 | 17.1 |
| Democratic | William Smith | 375 | 6.5 |
| Write-in | | 34 | 0.6 |
| Total votes | | 5,780 | |
General election
| Democratic | Eddie Gibbs (incumbent) | 34,635 | 98.8 |
| Write-in | | 418 | 1.2 |
| Total votes | | 35,053 | 100.0 |
| Democratic hold | | | |

=== 2022 general ===
2022 New York State Assembly election, District 68
Primary election
| Party | Candidate | Votes | % |
|---|---|---|---|
| Democratic | Eddie Gibbs (incumbent) | 3,002 | 36.9 |
| Democratic | John Ruiz Miranda | 2,049 | 25.2 |
| Democratic | Tamika Mapp | 1,566 | 19.3 |
| Democratic | Wilfredo Lopez | 1,484 | 18.3 |
| Write-in | | 28 | 0.3 |
| Total votes | | 8,129 | 100.0 |
General election
| Democratic | Eddie Gibbs | 20,278 | |
| Working Families | Eddie Gibbs | 1,909 | |
| Total | Eddie Gibbs (incumbent) | 22,187 | 86.6 |
| Republican | Daby Carreras | 3,369 | 13.1 |
| Write-in | | 65 | 0.3 |
| Total votes | | 25,621 | 100.0 |
| Democratic hold | | | |

=== 2022 special ===
Incumbent Robert Rodriguez resigned on November 1, 2021 to serve as New York Secretary of State, triggering a special election. In special elections for state legislative offices, primaries are usually not held – county committee members for each party select nominees.

2022 New York State Assembly special election, District 68
| Party | Candidate | Votes | % |
|---|---|---|---|
| Democratic | Eddie Gibbs | 1,076 | 81.4 |
| Republican | Daby Carreras | 133 | 10.1 |
| Write-in | Tamika Mapp | 40 | 3.0 |
| Write-in | Wilfredo Lopez | 37 | 2.8 |
| Write-in | Others | 36 | 2.7 |
| Total votes | | 1,322 | 100.0 |
| Democratic hold | | | |

=== 2020 ===
2020 New York State Assembly election, District 68
Primary election
| Party | Candidate | Votes | % |
|---|---|---|---|
| Democratic | Robert J. Rodriguez (incumbent) | 7,041 | 55.8 |
| Democratic | Tamika Mapp | 5,541 | 44.0 |
| Write-in | | 111 | 0.2 |
| Total votes | | 12,624 | 100.0 |
General election
| Democratic | Robert J. Rodriguez (incumbent) | 41,238 | 89.8 |
| Republican | Daby Carreras | 4,608 | 10.0 |
| Write-in | | 55 | 0.2 |
| Total votes | | 45,901 | 100.0 |
| Democratic hold | | | |

=== 2018 ===
2018 New York State Assembly election, District 68
Primary election
| Party | Candidate | Votes | % |
|---|---|---|---|
| Democratic | Robert J. Rodriguez (incumbent) | 10,814 | 74.6 |
| Democratic | John Ruiz | 3,612 | 24.9 |
| Write-in | | 75 | 0.5 |
| Total votes | | 14,501 | 100.0 |
General election
| Democratic | Robert J. Rodriguez (incumbent) | 32,140 | 93.1 |
| Republican | Daby Carreras | 2,168 | |
| Reform | Daby Carreras | 178 | |
| Total | Daby Carreras | 2,346 | 6.8 |
| Write-in | | 46 | 0.1 |
| Total votes | | 34,532 | 100.0 |
| Democratic hold | | | |

=== 2016 ===
2016 New York State Assembly election, District 68
| Party | Candidate | Votes | % |
|---|---|---|---|
| Democratic | Robert J. Rodriguez | 38,151 | |
| Women's Equality | Robert J. Rodriguez | 608 | |
| Total | Robert J. Rodriguez (incumbent) | 38,759 | 90.7 |
| Republican | Daby Carreras | 3,125 | |
| Independence | Daby Carreras | 342 | |
| Stop De Blasio | Daby Carreras | 237 | |
| Reform | Daby Carreras | 216 | |
| Total | Daby Carreras | 3,920 | 9.2 |
| Write-in | | 31 | 0.1 |
| Total votes | | 42,710 | 100.0 |
| Democratic hold | | | |

=== 2014 ===
2014 New York State Assembly election, District 68
| Party | Candidate | Votes | % |
|---|---|---|---|
| Democratic | Robert J. Rodriguez | 12,414 | |
| Working Families | Robert J. Rodriguez | 1,118 | |
| Total | Robert J. Rodriguez (incumbent) | 13,532 | 90.9 |
| Republican | Ted Jones | 1,292 | 8.7 |
| Write-in | | 60 | 0.4 |
| Total votes | | 14,884 | 100.0 |
| Democratic hold | | | |

=== 2012 ===
2012 New York State Assembly election, District 68
| Party | Candidate | Votes | % |
|---|---|---|---|
| Democratic | Robert J. Rodriguez | 30,512 | |
| Working Families | Robert J. Rodriguez | 1,033 | |
| Total | Robert J. Rodriguez (incumbent) | 31,545 | 99.9 |
| Write-in | | 30 | 0.1 |
| Total votes | | 31,575 | 100.0 |
| Democratic win (new boundaries) | | | |

=== 2010 ===
2010 New York State Assembly election, District 68
Primary election
| Party | Candidate | Votes | % |
|---|---|---|---|
| Democratic | Robert J. Rodriguez | 2,676 | 35.7 |
| Democratic | John Ruiz | 2,220 | 29.6 |
| Democratic | Marion Bell | 699 | 9.3 |
| Democratic | Alvin Johnson | 560 | 7.5 |
| Democratic | Eddie Gibbs | 548 | 7.3 |
| Democratic | Evette Zayas | 382 | 5.1 |
| Democratic | Felix Rosado | 374 | 5.0 |
| Write-in | | 32 | 0.5 |
| Total votes | | 7,491 | 100.0 |
General election
| Democratic | Robert J. Rodriguez | 15,771 | 88.9 |
| Working Families | John Ruiz | 1,491 | 8.4 |
| 100 People for Chuck | Carlton Berkley | 465 | 2.6 |
| Write-in | | 22 | 0.1 |
| Total votes | | 17,749 | 100.0 |
| Democratic hold | | | |

=== 2008 ===
2008 New York State Assembly election, District 68
| Party | Candidate | Votes | % |
|---|---|---|---|
| Democratic | Adam Clayton Powell IV (incumbent) | 30,161 | 91.6 |
| Republican | Norma Soriano | 2,122 | 6.5 |
| Independence | George Espada Sr. | 627 | 1.9 |
| Write-in | | 1 | 0.0 |
| Total votes | | 32,911 | 100.0 |
| Democratic hold | | | |

=== 2006 ===
2006 New York State Assembly election, District 68
Primary election
| Party | Candidate | Votes | % |
|---|---|---|---|
| Democratic | Adam Clayton Powell IV (incumbent) | 3,551 | 49.0 |
| Democratic | John Ruiz | 2,357 | 32.6 |
| Democratic | Eddie Gibbs | 1,331 | 18.4 |
| Write-in | | 1 | 0.0 |
| Total votes | | 7,240 | 100.0 |
General election
| Democratic | Adam Clayton Powell IV | 14,751 | |
| Working Families | Adam Clayton Powell IV | 878 | |
| Total | Adam Clayton Powell IV (incumbent) | 15,629 | 90.8 |
| Republican | Dean Loren Velazco | 1,170 | |
| Independence | Dean Loren Velazco | 306 | |
| Conservative | Dean Loren Velazco | 111 | |
| Total | Dean Loren Velazco | 1,587 | 9.2 |
| Write-in | | 4 | 0.0 |
| Total votes | | 17,220 | 100.0 |
| Democratic hold | | | |

=== 2004 ===
2004 New York State Assembly election, District 68
Primary election
| Party | Candidate | Votes | % |
|---|---|---|---|
| Democratic | Adam Clayton Powell IV (incumbent) | 3,727 | 51.8 |
| Democratic | John Ruiz | 2,523 | 34.9 |
| Democratic | Eddie Baca | 950 | 13.2 |
| Write-in | | 5 | 0.1 |
| Total votes | | 7,215 | 100.0 |
General election
| Democratic | Adam Clayton Powell IV (incumbent) | 26,407 | 100.0 |
| Write-in | | 0 | 0.0 |
| Total votes | | 26,407 | 100.0 |
| Democratic hold | | | |

=== 2002 ===
2002 New York State Assembly election, District 68
Primary election
| Party | Candidate | Votes | % |
|---|---|---|---|
| Democratic | Adam Clayton Powell IV (incumbent) | 4,777 | 60.1 |
| Democratic | John Ruiz | 1,870 | 23.6 |
| Democratic | Carmen Quinones | 1,295 | 16.3 |
| Write-in | | 2 | 0.0 |
| Total votes | | 7,944 | 100.0 |
General election
| Democratic | Adam Clayton Powell IV | 12,191 | |
| Working Families | Adam Clayton Powell IV | 601 | |
| Liberal | Adam Clayton Powell IV | 228 | |
| Total | Adam Clayton Powell IV | 13,020 | 86.3 |
| Republican | Emma Jackson | 1,566 | |
| Independence | Emma Jackson | 275 | |
| Total | Emma Jackson | 1,841 | 12.2 |
| Green | William Gerena-Roche | 220 | 1.5 |
| Write-in | | 0 | 0.0 |
| Total votes | | 15,081 | 100.0 |
| Democratic win (new boundaries) | | | |
