= Boutique firm =

A boutique firm is a small firm offering specialized services, such as:

- Boutique investment bank
- Boutique law firm
