= Eddie Gibbs (politician) =

American politician

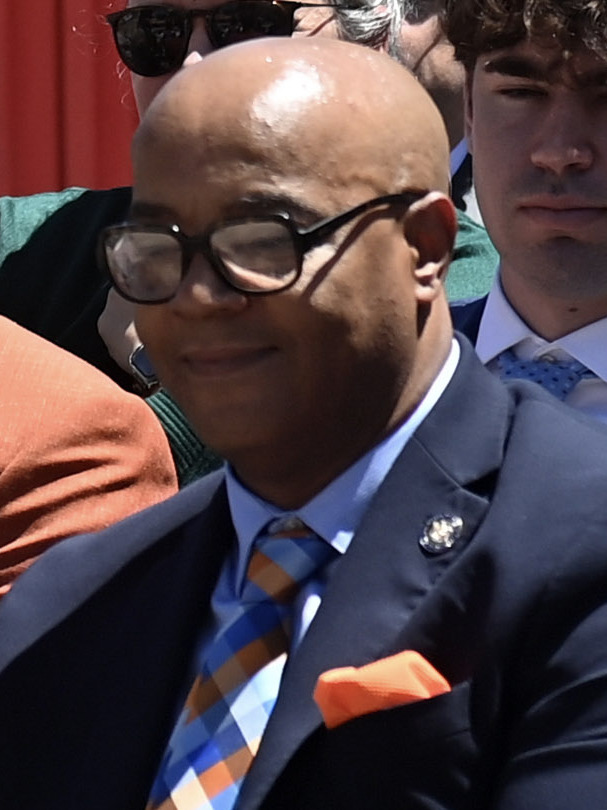
- Gibbs in 2026

Member of the New York State Assembly from the 68th district
- Incumbent
- Assumed office January 26, 2022
- Preceded by: Robert Rodriguez

Personal details
- Born: October 28, 1968 (age 58) New York City, New York, U.S.
- Party: Democratic
- Education: Cayuga Community College

Edward L. Gibbs (born October 28, 1968) is an American politician who has represented the 68th district in the New York State Assembly since 2022. He is the first formerly incarcerated New York Assembly member.

== Early life and incarceration ==
Born the second-eldest of four, Gibbs was raised in public housing in East Harlem by a single mother. His family lived off of welfare. As a teenager, Gibbs sold crack cocaine to support his family.

At 17 years old, Gibbs was stabbed in the leg in an attempted robbery. In what he later said was an act of self defense, Gibbs shot and killed his attacker before turning himself in at a local police station. He spent 17 months on Rikers Island before accepting a plea deal and pleaded guilty to manslaughter. Gibbs then served time at the Elmira, Cayuga, and Mid-State Correctional Facilities. In prison, he received his GED and associate degree.

== 2024 arrest ==
On October 3, 2024, Gibbs was arrested and taken into custody following a confrontation with police which occurred after his brother was pulled over for having an unregistered vehicle. The incident, which started out as a heated conversation before escalating, later resulted in a dozen police cars responding. Gibbs was not immediately released and still remained in custody during the afternoon. Though the reason for the arrest was not immediately specified, it was not believed to be connected to the ongoing criminal investigation against New York Mayor Eric Adams, whom Gibbs is an ally of.

Later in the day, while speaking outside his precinct office, Gibbs apologized to "officer Fibbs" and "officer Peter," stating that the arrest was justified and that he had interfered with a police investigation. Despite this, the exact charges he is facing remain unknown.
