= Transwestern =

Real estate firm

- Founded: 1978
- Headquarters: Houston, Texas
- Key people: Robert Duncan, Chairman; Larry Heard, CEO; Steve Harding, COO; Adam Altsuler, CFO, Allison Allen, Chief Human Resources Officer; Frances Thomson, Chief Marketing Officer; Bruce Ford President, East Region; Chip Clarke, President, Americas, Greg Munson, President TRS, Carleton Riser, President TDC, Charles Hazen President TIG
- Number of employees: More than 2,100
- Subsidiaries: Ridge Development; Delta Associates; Transwestern Realty Finance Partners, L.L.C.
- Website: transwestern.com

Transwestern is a privately held real estate firm providing Agency Leasing, Tenant Advisory, Capital Markets, Asset Services and Research to owners of commercial real estate. Additionally, they have expertise in development and investment management.

== Services ==
- Advisory Groups
- Agency Leasing
- Asset Services
- Capital Markets
- Consulting Services
- Technology
- Tenant Advisory + Workplace Solutions

== History ==
In 1978, the company was founded as a real estate development company by Robert Duncan.

During the recession of the late 1980s and early 1990s, the company converted into a services business.

Beginning in 1994, the company expanded into the West, Southwest and Midwest regions of the United States.

In 1995, the company acquired Delta Associates, a provider of market research.

In 1998, the company acquired Carey Winston, the largest commercial real estate broker in the Washington, D.C. metropolitan area. That year, Transwestern Commercial co-founder and chairman Randall K. Rowe was elected chairman of the National Realty Committee.

In the early 2000s, Transwestern Real Estate Services expanded into 30 markets.

In January 2001, the company brokered a $113 million, 15-year lease for Oblon in Arlington, Virginia.

In January 2011, Transwestern acquired Fort Worth-based NAI Huff Partners.

In 2013, Transwestern Development Company was established to develop speculative and build-to-suit projects.

In September 2013, Transwestern acquired the Boston firm of Richards Barry Joyce & Partners LLC.

In January 2014, the company acquired Epic Realty Partners LLC, based in Chicago, Illinois, to grow its industrial business.

In March 2014, the company formed a joint venture with the principals of Chicago-based Ridge Property Trust called Ridge Development to expand its industrial development platform.

In February 2015, Transwestern Strategic Partners, the discretionary investment management arm of the company, acquired a property in Scottsdale, Arizona for $58.5 million.

In March 2017, the company acquired Chicago-based tenant advisory firm Tru Office Advisors.

In May 2022, Transwestern expanded its North American presence through alliance with Canada-based ENCOR Advisors.

In 2022, Transwestern Hospitality Group was created to focus on hospitality, investment, development and operations.

In January 2023, Transwestern acquired MB Real Estate in Chicago and boutique firms in Washington D.C.
