= Troutman Pepper Locke =

American law firm

Troutman Pepper Locke LLP
- Headquarters: Bank of America Plaza; Atlanta, Georgia, US
- No. of offices: 33
- No. of attorneys: 1,600
- Major practice areas: General practice, construction, energy/renewable energy, financial services, health care, insurance, and private equity.
- Key people: Thomas J. Cole, Jr., Chair; David Taylor, Vice Chair; Ashley L. Taylor, Jr., Vice Chair; Amie V. Colby, Managing Partner.
- Date founded: January 1, 2025
- Company type: Limited liability partnership
- Website: www.troutman.com

Troutman Pepper Locke LLP is an international law firm with more than 1,600 attorneys located across 32 U.S. cities and London. The firm was formed on January 1, 2025, as a merger of Troutman Pepper and Locke Lord.

== History ==
Troutman Pepper Locke's predecessor, Troutman Sanders, was founded in 1897 in Atlanta as the law practice of Walter T. Colquitt. Over the years, it went through many mergers and acquisitions. Before Troutman's merger with Locke Lord, the firm had more than 1,200 attorneys located in 23 U.S. cities. The latest incarnation of the firm was a result of a merger between Troutman Sanders and Pepper Hamilton in 2020. The firm had about $1.08 billion in gross revenue in 2023.

Locke Lord originated in 1891, when Maurice Locke founded its predecessor firm in Dallas. Another predecessor firm was founded in Chicago in 1914 by John Lord. Locke Lord had also gone through several merger and acquisitions. In 2015, the firm merged with Edwards Wildman. Locke Lord had about $497 million in gross revenue in 2023.

In September 2024, it was announced that Troutman Pepper and Locke Lord would be merging effective January 1, 2025. The new law firm took the name Troutman Pepper Locke LLP.

The merger established the combined firm as one of the 50 largest law firms in the United States.
