= Molly Silfen =

American judge (born 1980)

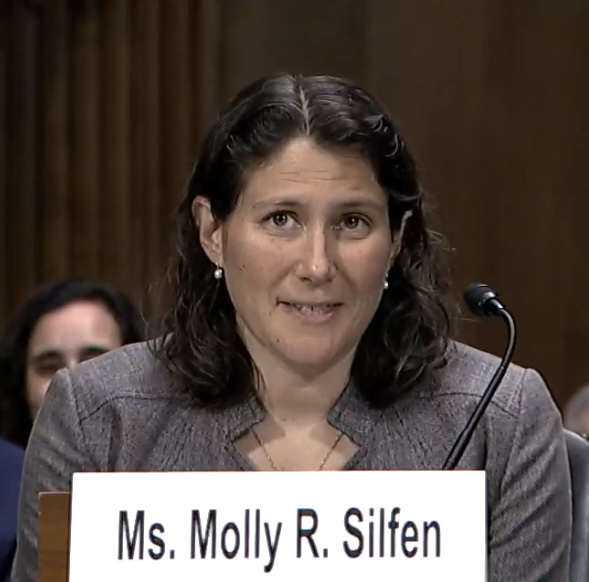

Judge of the United States Court of Federal Claims
- Incumbent
- Assumed office June 13, 2023
- Appointed by: Joe Biden
- Preceded by: Susan G. Braden

Personal details
- Born: 1980 (age 45–46) Philadelphia, Pennsylvania, U.S.
- Education: Yale University (BS); Harvard University (JD)

Molly Rebecca Silfen (born 1980) is an American lawyer who serves as a judge of the United States Court of Federal Claims.

== Education ==
Silfen received a Bachelor of Science from Yale University in 2002 and a Juris Doctor from Harvard Law School in 2006. She taught a class on the practice of law before the Federal Circuit at George Mason Law School.

== Career ==
She served as a law clerk to Judge Alan David Lourie of the United States Court of Appeals for the Federal Circuit from 2008 to 2010. From 2006 to 2008 and again from 2010 to 2013, she was an associate at Finnegan, Henderson, Farabow, Garrett & Dunner LLP in Washington, D.C. She previously served as an appellate attorney in the appellate section of the Civil Division at the United States Department of Justice from 2015 to 2016. From 2013 to 2023, she served as an associate solicitor in the United States Patent and Trademark Office. From 2021 to January 2023, she was detailed to serve as a counsel on the United States Senate Judiciary Subcommittee on Intellectual Property. Silfen serves as Chair of the PTO committee for the Federal Circuit Bar Association.

=== Claims court service ===
On February 22, 2023, President Joe Biden announced his intent to nominate Silfen to serve as a judge of the United States Court of Federal Claims. On February 27, 2023, her nomination was sent to the Senate. President Biden nominated Silfen to the seat vacated by Judge Susan G. Braden, who assumed senior status on July 13, 2018. On March 22, 2023, a hearing on her nomination was held before the Senate Judiciary Committee. On May 4, 2023, her nomination was reported out of committee by a 14–7 vote. On June 8, 2023, the United States Senate invoked cloture on her nomination by a 55–41 vote. Later that day, her nomination was confirmed by a 55–39 vote. She received her judicial commission on June 13, 2023. She took the oath of office on June 15, 2023.

Legal offices
| Preceded by Susan G. Braden | Judge of the United States Court of Federal Claims; 2023–present | Incumbent |
