= Francis M. Shea =

American lawyer

Francis M. Shea (June 16, 1905 – August 8, 1989) was an American lawyer, law professor and United States government official.

== Early life and education ==
Born in Manchester, New Hampshire, Francis Michael Shea (also known as Frank Shea) was a son of New Hampshire state senator and attorney Michael Shea and Margaret (Muldoon) Shea. He attended and graduated from Dartmouth College (A.B., 1925) and Harvard Law School (LL.B., 1928).

== Career ==
Following law school, Shea obtained, through a referral from his law school professor Felix Frankfurter, a position practicing law with a prominent attorney, John Lord O'Brian, in Buffalo, New York. From 1929-1933, Shea lived in Buffalo and practiced with the law firm of Slee, O'Brian, Hellings and Ulsh.

In 1933, Shea moved to Washington to join the New Deal. He became a lawyer in the Agriculture Adjustment Administration. During 1935-1936, he was general counsel to the Puerto Rico Reconstruction Administration.

In 1936, Shea returned to Buffalo and became dean of the University of Buffalo School of Law. Implementing the University Council's order to upgrade the school, Shea hired fellow Harvard graduates Louis L. Jaffe, Mark DeWolfe Howe, David Reisman Jr. and others to join the faculty. Shea also expanded the school's library, intensified the moot court program and emphasized the casebook/Socratic, rather than the textbook/lecture, method of teaching. In 1936, the law school was admitted to the Association of American Law Schools (AALS). In 1937, the school received American Bar Association (ABA) accreditation. During Shea's tenure as dean, some began to call Buffalo Law School "Little Harvard."

In 1939, Shea was recruited by his friend from western New York State, then Solicitor General of the United States (and later U.S. Attorney General and then U.S. Supreme Court justice) Robert H. Jackson, to join the administration of President Franklin D. Roosevelt. Shea was nominated by Roosevelt and confirmed by the Senate to serve as Assistant Attorney General heading the Claims Division (today the Civil Division) in the U.S. Department of Justice (DOJ). He served for six years, running the Division and personally arguing over 50 cases in the U.S. Supreme Court and other federal appellate courts. His Supreme Court cases included Marconi Wireless Telegraph Company v. United States (1943), regarding patents in radio broadcasting, and Federal Power Commission v. Hope Natural Gas (1944), a landmark regarding government rate-setting.

In spring 1945, Shea joined the staff of his friend Justice Robert H. Jackson, who President Truman had appointed to prosecute captured Nazi leaders for committing war crimes. During summer 1945, Shea worked as one of Justice Jackson's chief assistants in Washington and then in London, where the U.S. and allied nations negotiated the creation of the International Military Tribunal (IMT). That fall, Shea and all of the Jackson staff relocated to Nuremberg in the U.S. military occupation zone of the surrendered former Nazi Germany. Shea and staff assembled evidence and prepared cases, primarily regarding Nazi economic measures that had supported the Nazi Party and state, for trial before the IMT. In October, Shea was the United States representative who presented to the IMT in Berlin the indictment of the defendants who then were prosecuted in Nuremberg. Shea left Jackson's staff before the international Nuremberg trial began in November 1945. In fall 1946, Shea returned to Nuremberg and was present with Jackson when the IMT rendered its judgments on September 30 and October 1.

In 1947, Shea and Warner W. Gardner, a fellow lawyer in DOJ during the 1930s and early 1940s, founded what became a leading Washington law firm, Shea & Gardner. Shea had an active litigation and regulatory practice there until his death in 1989, of lung cancer, in Alexandria, Virginia.

== Personal life ==
Francis Shea was married to attorney Hilda Droshnicopp Shea (June 22, 1910 – January 13, 2009). They were parents of a son, Richard.
