= Jenkens & Gilchrist =

Law firm in Dallas

- Headquarters: (United States) Dallas, TX
- No. of offices: ?
- No. of attorneys: 600+
- Major practice areas: General practice
- Revenue: —
- Date founded: 1951 (Dallas, TX)
- Company type: DEFUNCT

Jenkens & Gilchrist, P.C. was a Dallas-based law firm, founded in 1951 as Jenkens & Bowens to service the various businesses controlled by Clint Murchison Jr. The Dallas Morning News was an early client. As a result of the extent of Murchison family holdings, the firm soon developed expertise in corporate transactions.

In the 1980s, the firm faced liability and financial difficulties resulting from involvement in the Savings and Loan Crisis. Jenkens settled a number of malpractice lawsuits in 1987 for $18 million. In the 1990s, Jenkens saw intense growth and added offices outside Texas for the first time to expand from a regional into a national law firm.

Opening a Chicago office with a tax attorney team from Altheimer & Gray in 1998 would become the most fateful act for the firm. In 2000, the firm merged with Parker Chapin Flattau & Klimpl to launch in New York City. By 2001, the firm employed more than 600 attorneys, reaching its peak in size. In 2004, the firm advised Fossil, Inc. in its $173 million secondary securities offering managed jointly by J.P. Morgan, Jefferies & Company, and CIBC World Markets.

== Firm's demise ==
In the 1990s, the Chicago office began a lucrative practice of offering tax shelter advice to a variety of wealthy corporate and individual clients, primarily by drafting opinion letters stating that certain tax schemes were compliant with the Internal Revenue Code. The Chicago tax group earned $267 million from 1998 to 2003. The group worked in coordination with tax advisers at Ernst & Young.

The Internal Revenue Service (IRS) began investigating Ernst & Young and several taxpayers in 2002. Eventually, it audited many Jenkens clients, who subsequently filed malpractice suits against the firm. In 2003, the IRS itself sued Jenkens & Gilchrist. Facing a substantial potential liability, the firm began to unravel.

As negotiations about settling with the government and other plaintiffs dragged on, partners with portable business began to depart. In 2005, the 90-attorney New York City office from legacy Parker Chapin defected to Troutman Sanders. In 2007, the Los Angeles office decamped to Baker & Hostetler. The remaining partners in the Chicago office switched to Nixon Peabody. Some 100 attorneys in Dallas, Austin and Houston found a new home at Hunton & Williams. The majority of the San Antonio office moved to Texas firm Jackson Walker, LP while Partner Phillip D. Freeman and Associate Nicole Betters, along with many from the Austin office, moved to Winstead.

Finally, the firm agreed to settle its liabilities with the IRS, pay a $76 million fine, and to cease practicing law effective March 31, 2007.

On May 24, 2011, four lawyers with the firm were found guilty of tax evasion, conspiracy, and related charges stemming from a ten-year tax shelter scheme that prosecutors said generated more than $1 billion in fictive losses. As of 2012, the defendants were seeking a new trial after learning one of the jurors lied about her background in order to be selected.

Former Jenkens & Gilchrist attorney, Paul M. Daugerdas, 63, a tax attorney and certified public accountant, was later sentenced in Manhattan federal court to serve 15 years in prison for orchestrating a massive fraudulent tax shelter scheme in which he and his co-conspirators designed, marketed and implemented fraudulent tax shelters used by wealthy individuals to evade over $1.6 billion in taxes owed to the Internal Revenue Service (IRS).
