= Donovan, Leisure, Newton & Irvine =

American law firm

Donovan Leisure Newton & Irvine
- Date founded: 1929
- Founder: William J. Donovan
- Dissolved: 1998

Donovan Leisure Newton & Irvine was an American white-shoe law firm, located in New York. It was founded in 1929 by General William "Wild Bill" Donovan, who was often referenced as the Father of the CIA. The firm dissolved in 1998. Its notable antitrust cases include a series of lawsuits involving American Cyanamid in the 1960s and Kodak. The firm wrote a practice book on ADR. The firm closed its doors after in 1998 when about 40 of its 60 lawyers were hired by Orrick, Herrington & Sutcliffe, a "large California law firm that [was] expanding aggressively in Manhattan."

== Notable alumni ==
- William J. Donovan, the founder of the firm, who during World War II was the head of the Office of Strategic Services, the forerunner of the Central Intelligence Agency.
- J. Edward Lumbard, one of the founders of the firm in 1933, prosecutor in the office of the United States Attorney for the Southern District of New York, and judge for the United States Court of Appeals for the Second Circuit.
- Lloyd Blankfein, former CEO and Chairman of Goldman Sachs.
- William Egan Colby, Director of Central Intelligence (1973–1976).
- Paul A. Crotty, a federal judge for the United States District Court for the Southern District of New York.
- Nelson Denis, attorney, former member of the New York State Assembly.
- Roderick M. Hills, a former chairman of the Securities and Exchange Commission.
- Theodore S. Hope Jr., professor and co-author of many corporate law theories.
- Edward F. Cox, chairman of the New York Republican State Committee.
- Clarence Otis Jr., former CEO and chairman of Darden Restaurants.
- Walton C. Ament, vice president and general manager at Pathé News, one of the leaders in driving the newsreel artform that became a staple of movie theaters from the 1910s to the 1970s. Newsreels were particularly important during the 1930s and 1940s, when they engaged viewers in a more intimate understanding of the conditions of the Great Depression and World War II.
- Whitman Knapp, who joined the firm after working as an assistant district attorney in Manhattan under Thomas E. Dewey.
- Laurence Tosi, managing partner of WestCap Group.
- David Pitofsky, general counsel for Newscorp.
- Bill Brown, co-inventor of Allam power cycle and founder and CEO of NET Power and 8 Rivers.

== See also ==
- List of defunct law firms
