= Shea & Gardner =

American law firm

Shea & Gardner was a Washington, D.C.–based law firm, formed in 1947 and acquired by Boston-based Goodwin Procter in 2004.

== Founding and clients ==
The firm was founded by two Franklin Delano Roosevelt administration officials, Francis M. Shea and Warner W. Gardner. After World War II, Shea and Gardner decided to form a firm with an unusual emphasis on the brilliance of the individual attorneys.

Shea & Gardner was founded by two former members of the administration of Franklin D. Roosevelt in 1947. One of the founders, Warner W. Gardner, began practicing at the firm that year, before retiring in 1999. Francis M. Shea died in 1989, after arguing over 50 cases in the Fedearl appellate courts, including Hope v. Natural Gas, and United States V. Marconi.

Shea and Gardner is known for its litigation, lobbying and regulatory expertise. The firm was old fashioned in that many lawyers were generalists more than specialists. And although there were adjustments, compensation was largely tied to seniority.

Its client list included many regulated industries, including railways, insurance companies, mutual funds, maritime companies, mining companies and airlines. Notable clients included Prudential, American President Lines, Cassiar Mining, Fidelity Investments, Peadody Coal, Freeport-McMoRan, U.S. Gypsum, Newmont Mining, and the National Railway Labor Conference. The firm also represented the Iraqi National Congress, a U.S.-supported opposition group. The firm registered as a foreign agent in order to represent the Iraqi exiles. Another notable representation was a successful challenge to the FDIC's brokered deposit regulations.

During the late 1980s the firm handled major bank failure cases including First Republic (then the largest bank failure in US history) and Bank of New England.

The firm did take on diverse and big projects, like emergency boards in railway labor disputes, cleanup of superfund sites, compliance programs to remediate legacy computer systems, and national asbestos-related litigation and claims.

The firm prided itself on its pro bono work and generally left the selection of pro bono up to individual partners. One partner, William Sheehan, for example, was allowed to represent a Georgia inmate on death row. Another partner, Jeff Martin, was diagnosed with early onset Parkinson's. The firm encouraged Martin 's advocacy for patients and Martin became Chairman of the Board of the Parkinson Action Network and a member of the NIH's National Advisory Council on Neurological Disorders and Stroke. Martin also litigated to uphold embryonic stem cell research and became a leading advocate for increased funding of medical research. The 2003 book Merchants of Immortality, by science writer Stephen Hall, describes Martin's activity in great detail. The firm supported those activities.

Around 2003, despite strong financial performance, Shea & Gardner began to look for a merger partner in light of the changing marketplace for legal services and the challenges facing mid-sized firms. The partners settled on Goodwin Procter because that firm had a small Washington, D.C. office of only 12 attorneys and the legacy Shea partners could play a large role in shaping and growing the profile of the combined firm in the nation's capital. In October 2004, the two firms merged, with Shea & Garnder and its 70 lawyers to be known as Goodwin Procter under chairwoman and managing partner Regina Pisa.

Shea and Gardner for many years hosted the offices of the Washington Legal Clinic for the Homeless.

== Warner Gardner ==
Warner Gardner's memoir, Pebbles From the Path behind, discloses that the ill-fated FDR court-packing scheme was a brainchild of his. During Gardner's last Supreme Court argument—which he won—Lockheed v. Thomas, Chief Justice Burger allowed Gardner to continue speaking a full five minutes after the red light went on, a gesture of respect virtually unprecedented.

== Frances Shea ==
Shea was born in Manchester, New Hampshire, He was a son of New Hampshire state senator and attorney Michael Shea and Margaret (Muldoon) Shea. He attended and graduated from Dartmouth College (A.B., 1925) and Harvard Law School (LL.B., 1928). Following law school, Shea obtained, through a referral from his law school professor Felix Frankfurter, a position practicing law with a prominent attorney, John Lord O'Brian, in Buffalo, New York. From 1929 to 1933, Shea lived in Buffalo and practiced with the law firm of Slee, O'Brian, Hellings and Ulsh. During the Great Depression Shea served in many government posts.

== Notable alumni ==
The firm is notable for its alumni who went on to teach at leading law schools or to serve in high government positions.

- Lisa Brown, staff secretary under President Barack Obama
- William N. Eskridge Jr., professor at Yale Law School
- Stephen Hadley, U.S. Assistant to the President for National Security Affairs under President George W. Bush
- R. James Woolsey, Jr., former director of the CIA

== See also ==
- List of defunct law firms
