= Robert J. Rodriguez =

American politician

Robert Rodriguez

President and Chief Executive Officer of the New York State Dormitory Authority
- Incumbent
- Assumed office May 8, 2024; Acting: May 8, 2024 – May 22, 2024
- Governor: Kathy Hochul
- Preceded by: Reuben McDaniel

67th Secretary of State of New York
- In office December 9, 2021 – May 8, 2024; Acting: December 9, 2021 – March 2, 2022
- Governor: Kathy Hochul
- Preceded by: Brendan Hughes (acting)
- Succeeded by: Brendan Hughes (acting)

Member of the New York State Assembly from the 68th district
- In office January 1, 2011 – November 4, 2021
- Preceded by: Adam Powell
- Succeeded by: Eddie Gibbs

Personal details
- Born: April 11, 1976 (age 50) New York City, New York, U.S.
- Party: Democratic
- Education: Yale University (BA); New York University (MBA)

Robert J. Rodriguez (born April 11, 1976) is the president and chief executive officer of the New York State Dormitory Authority. He was the Secretary of State of New York from December 2021 to May 2024. He also served as a Democratic member of the New York State Assembly, representing the 68th Assembly District from 2011 to 2021.

== Early life and education ==
The son of former New York City Councilmember Robert Rodriguez, Robert J. Rodriguez was born and raised in East Harlem. He attended P.S. 112, River East Elementary School, Isaac Newton Middle School, and Cardinal Hayes High School. He holds a B.A. in history and political science from Yale University, and received his M.B.A. from New York University.

== Career in politics and government ==
Rodriguez was a member of the Assembly from 2011 to 2021. He represented Assembly District 68. He was Chair of the Mitchell-Lama Subcommittee, working to provide affordable housing.

On November 4, 2021, Governor Kathy Hochul nominated Rodriguez for appointment as Secretary of State of New York. Rodriguez assumed an acting role as secretary in December 2021, and was confirmed by the New York State Senate on March 2, 2022.

Rodriguez left his position as secretary of state in May 2024 to become president and chief executive officer of the Dormitory Authority of the State of New York. Upon Senate confirmation, he was succeeded by Walter T. Mosley.

== Personal life ==
Rodriguez was charged with driving while intoxicated in 2013.

Political offices
Preceded by Brendan Hughes; Acting	Secretary of State of New York; 2021–2024; Acting: 2021–2022	Succeeded by Brendan Hughes; Acting
