= Pennie & Edmonds =

- Headquarters: Palo Alto
- Website: Official website

Pennie & Edmonds was a New York City-based boutique law firm that focused on all aspects of intellectual property law. The firm practiced from 1883 until December 31, 2003, when it dissolved.

== History ==
The firm's dissolution came in the wake of boutique IP firms losing ground to general practice firms – and, perhaps more acutely, the loss of key rainmakers. These were mostly patent litigation partners who took their clients to full-service firms (see book of business).

The departure of rainmaker Jonathan A. Marshall did not bode well for the firm. Marshall, a litigator with clients such as Hewlett-Packard, joined Weil Gotshal & Manges in 2002. With the firm's lease up for renewal and its partners unwilling to personally guarantee it, Pennie & Edmonds began exploring the possibility of a merger with other firms. However, a pending lawsuit for legal malpractice against the firm may have dissuaded other firms from such a merger. In the end, the firm's partners voted to dissolve the law firm.

The Palo Alto office joined Philadelphia's Morgan, Lewis & Bockius, while much of the New York office joined Jones Day, a national firm.

Marshall later rejoined another IP boutique firm, Fish & Richardson, which has been rapidly expanding into the General Practice arena.
