= Clarence Otis Jr. =

American businessman

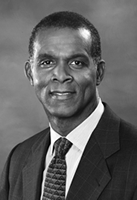
- Otis in 2012
- Born: 11 April 1956 (age 70); Vicksburg, Mississippi
- Education: Stanford Law School
- Occupations: CEO, chairman
- Known for: Darden Restaurants
- Spouse: Jacqueline Bradley (m. 1983)
- Children: 3

Clarence Otis Jr. (born April 11, 1956) is an American businessman and former CEO and chairman of Darden Restaurants. Otis was named the 11th most powerful person in Central Florida by the Orlando Sentinel in 2010.

== Early life ==
Otis was born in Vicksburg, Mississippi, on April 11, 1956, to Clarence Otis, a janitor and Calanthus Hall Otis, a homemaker. He moved with his family to Los Angeles where he grew up in Watts, at the height of the civil unrest of the 1960s.

== Education ==
He gained a scholarship into Williams College in Massachusetts, where he majored in Economics and Political Science. He graduated magna cum laude in 1977, receiving the school's Political Science writing prize and Phi Beta Kappa recognition in his senior year. Otis then moved on to Stanford Law School in California, earning his J.D. degree in 1980.

== Career ==
He worked in the field of corporate law, specializing in the fields of securities law and mergers and acquisitions. He started out with the firm Donovan, Leisure, Newton & Irvine and moved on to Gordon, Hurwitz, Butowsky, Weitzen, Shalov & Wein. From the start he ran with a high-flying crowd; one of his clients was famed financier Carl Icahn. He later on remarked, "I thought the finance side was more exciting than the law, so I moved to an investment banking firm"—Kidder, Peabody & Co. The barely 30-year-old Otis became a vice president at First Boston Corporation in 1987. In this job he got his first exposure to Florida's booming economy as he worked on real estate deals there. He became interested in public and government finance, serving as managing director of Giebert Municipal Capital in 1990 and 1991, and as a vice president and later managing director in Chemical Bank's securities arm between 1991 and 1995. He played a key part in turning around the bank's struggling public finance division, shepherding funding of $2.6 billion for tax-exempt pollution-control projects and participating a $208 million New York City bond issue that was named deal of the year by Institutional Investor magazine.

In 1995, Otis was recruited by Darden Restaurants in Orlando for the post of treasurer, overseeing finance activities for the 1,200-restaurant chain. He correctly assessed Darden as a company on the rise as its "casual dining" market niche—high-volume sit-down restaurants a step above fast food in terms of quality—was growing rapidly. Otis came to the company in the final stages of its spin-off from food giant General Mills.

While Otis supervised a staff of six, his decisions had company wide ramifications as Darden acquired new sites and financed new buildings all over the country; the chain owns its restaurants rather than franchising them to independent entrepreneurs. He ascended the corporate ladder at Darden, becoming senior vice president of finance in 1997 and chief financial officer in 1999. As the chain shuttered its struggling China Coast restaurants and opened new ventures such as the casual sports-bar barbecue Smokey Bones and the Caribbean-themed Bahama Breeze,

As longtime Darden CEO Joe L. Lee, who opened the first Red Lobster restaurant in Florida in 1967, approached retirement, Otis was widely regarded as a protégé of Lee, and after one of his top rivals left for a top position with Burger King, his way was clear. Otis was named Lee's successor as CEO in 2004. He stepped down in 2014.

=== Compensation ===
While CEO of Darden Restaurants in 2010, Otis earned a total compensation of $7,656,703, which included a base salary of $946,800, a cash bonus of $1,673,900, stocks granted of $1,783,697, options granted of $2,879,930, and other compensation totaling $372,376.

== Politics ==
According to Matthew Yglesias, Otis "seems to be a Democrat" and has donated to Democratic Congressman Ron Klein of Florida.

== Personal life ==
Otis and his wife Jacqueline Bradley (b. 1958) were married in 1983 and have raised three children; Calvin, Randall and Allison.

== See also ==
- List of Georgetown University business alumni
