= Addleshaw Goddard =

Law firm in the UK

Addleshaw Goddard LLP
- Headquarters: 41 Lothbury, London EC2R 7HG, United Kingdom
- No. of offices: 21
- Offices: Aberdeen, Abu Dhabi, Berlin, Doha, Dubaï, Dublin, Edinburgh, Frankfurt, Glasgow, Hamburg, Leeds, London, Luxembourg, Madrid, Manchester, Muscat, Munich, Paris, Riyadh,Singapore and Warsaw.
- No. of lawyers: 2,000 +
- No. of employees: 3,000 +
- Major practice areas: Corporate and commercial, real estate, construction and engineering, financial services, investment management, dispute resolution, criminal law, competition and regulation, restructuring, infrastructure projects and energy, tax, employment and intellectual property,
- Key people: Aster Crawshaw (Senior Partner) – Andrew Johnston (Managing Partner)
- Revenue: ▲£551m (€638m - $745 m) in 2025
- Profit per equity partner: ▲£1m (in 2025)
- Date founded: 1775
- Founder: Samuel Booth – John Addleshaw – Theodore Goddard
- Company type: Limited liability partnership
- Website: addleshawgoddard.com

Addleshaw Goddard LLP (informally AG) is an international law firm headquartered in London, the United Kingdom. It is structured as a fully integrated LLP and has more than 2,000 lawyers including 444 partners in 21 offices located in Aberdeen, Abu Dhabi, Berlin, Doha, Dubai, Dublin, Edinburgh, Frankfurt, Glasgow, Hamburg, Leeds, London, Luxembourg, Madrid, Manchester, Munich, Muscat, Paris, Riyadh, Singapore and Warsaw and an affiliated office in Tokyo. The firm advises FTSE 100 and other major companies across corporate, commercial, finance and project, real estate and litigation business divisions with specialist fields such as private capital; energy, financial services, health and life sciences, real estate, retail and consumer, construction and transport sectors; and has a strong interest in tech.

Addleshaw Goddard was formed on 1 May 2003 by the merger of Addleshaw Booth & Co with Theodore Goddard. In 2017, the firm merged with the Scottish law firm HBJ. In 2022, the firm merged with the Irish law Firm Eugene F. Collins. With £551m (€638m - $745m) (+11%) gross revenue in 2025, the firm is the 19th largest law firm in the United Kingdom and ranked 97th largest worldwide law firm by revenue in the 2025 Global 200 worldwide law firms ranking.

== History ==
Addleshaw Goddard traces its roots back to the very first public record of solicitors in the UK – the Law List – published in 1775.

=== Addleshaw Booth & Co ===
In 1775, Nicholas Smith founds a firm in Leeds, and Samuel Lister Booth is admitted as a solicitor in 1823. The successors of these practices combined over the years to become Booth, Clough & Booth in 1869. Further amalgamations lead to the firm becoming Booth & Co. In c.1936. John William Addleshaw begins legal practice in 1857 in Manchester and enters partnership with William Warburton in 1873. The firm becomes Addleshaw & Sons in 1904, and then Addleshaw Sons & Latham in 1917. In 1997, Addleshaw Sons & Latham merges with Booth & Co to become the national firm Addleshaw Booth & Co.

=== Theodore Goddard ===
In 1902, John Theodore Goddard founds blue chip, City of London firm, Theodore Goddard, which grows through amalgamation with other city practices, such as Rhys Roberts & Co (founded in 1883 by future Prime Minister David Lloyd George). The firm developed as a balanced general practice, with an emphasis on high-profile private client work. Goddard was appointed by Wallis Simpson as an adviser to her during divorce proceedings and in relation to her involvement during the United Kingdom abdication Crisis of 1936. Theodore Goddard retained a strong media and entertainment law practice with clients such as The Rolling Stones, David Bowie, Michael Jackson and others; and high-profile cases involving celebrities such as the Hello! magazine dispute over photographs of Catherine Zeta-Jones's wedding to Michael Douglas.

=== Addleshaw Goddard ===
In 2003, Addleshaw Booth & Co and Theodore Goddard merged to become Addleshaw Goddard.

In 2012, Addleshaw Goddard opened offices in Singapore, Dubai, Hong Kong (which has now been shuttered), Oman and Qatar.

In 2017, the firm expanded into Scotland by merging with HBJ and adding offices in Aberdeen, Edinburgh, and Glasgow.

In 2019, the firm opened its first office in continental Europe, welcoming partners in Hamburg. In 2021, the firm opened an office in Paris. In March 2022, Addleshaw Goddard merged with Top 15 Irish law firm Eugene F. Collins and extended its footprint in Continental Europe by opening 3 offices in Luxembourg, Frankfurt and Munich.

In January 2024, the firm opened its 4th German office in Berlin and an office in Riyadh. In May 2024, the firm took over the Spanish office of King Wood & Mallesons and opened an office in Madrid.

In May 2025, the firm took over the Polish office of Linklaters and opened an office in Warsaw. In June 2025, the firm opened an office in Abu Dhabi its fifth office in the Middle East.

== Offices ==
As of June 2025, Addleshaw Goddard has 21 offices in Asia, Europe and the Middle East located in Aberdeen, Abu Dhabi, Berlin, Doha, Dubai, Dublin, Edinburgh, Frankfurt, Glasgow, Hamburg, Leeds, London, Luxembourg, Madrid, Manchester, Munich, Muscat, Paris, Riyadh, Singapore and Warsaw and a network of relationships with chosen firms in North America, Europe and other emerging jurisdictions. The firm provides also legal services in Tokyo, Japan through a formal alliance with Hashidate Law Office.

== Ranking and recent awards ==
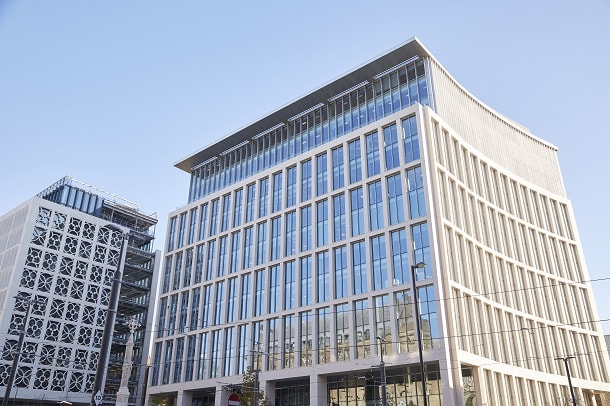
Addleshaw Goddard, Manchester office.

According to The Lawyer, a British legal newspaper, Addleshaw Goddard was ranked 15th largest law firm in the UK by turnover in 2006. It was ranked 91st in the world by the same periodical. Two years later the firm remained ranked 15th nationally (by turnover) in The Lawyer's UK 200 Annual Report. More recently Addleshaw Goddard ranked 19th in The Lawyer's top 200 firms in 2023.

The firm was also placed 91st in The Times newspaper's 'Top 100 Graduate Employers' for 2008. In March 2008 it was placed 40th in the Sunday Times '100 Best Companies to Work For' in the UK. The firm is the only law firm to also be included in the newspaper's Top 50 Places Where Women Want to Work, and the Top 100 Graduate Employers rankings as well as the 100 Best Companies. The ranking rose 43 places since the 2007 survey – one of the biggest improvements by any organisation reviewed and the best in the legal sector.

The firm is an FT Innovative Lawyers Award winner, which recognises its pioneering approach to legal services. In 2020, Addleshaw Goddard won the Real Estate Team of the Year award delivered by Legal Business.

In 2022, Addleshaw Goddard was ranked as a Top 10 law firms by Acritas (now part of Thomson Reuters) in their 2022 UK Law Firm Brand Index. In 2023, Addleshaw Godard were named as the winner of the AllAboutLaw 'Most Popular Law Firm' award.

The Legal 500 (2026) listed ranked 48 Tier 1 rankings across the UK offices and 245 lawyers have been individually recognised, including 194 in the Hall of Fame, Leading Partners, and Next Generation categories, and 34 Leading Associates. The Chambers Guide (2019) ranked 38 Tier 1 rankings across the UK offices and recognised lawyers in the UK, Asia and the Middle East in more than 40 different disciplines.

== Notable alumni ==
- Jonathan Reynolds, Secretary of State for Business and Trade
