= Theodore Goddard =

English solicitor (1878–1952)

- Headquarters: London, United Kingdom
- Major practice areas: General practice
- Date founded: 1902
- Company type: Partnership
- Dissolved: 1 May 2003

John Theodore Goddard (19 May 1878 – 27 November 1952) was an English solicitor and founder of the law firm Theodore Goddard (TG) based in London. The firm merged with Addleshaw Booth & Co on 1 May 2003 to become Addleshaw Goddard. Goddard was appointed by Wallis Simpson as an adviser to her during divorce proceedings and in relation to her involvement during the United Kingdom abdication Crisis of 1936.

== Origins ==
John Theodore Goddard from the photo portrait formerly hanging in the London office of Theodore Goddard

Born Highbury, London in 1878, Goddard lived at 106 Highbury New Park, London in 1901 with his widowed mother and siblings. At the age of 22, he was a solicitor's articled clerk. Later he lived at Hewitt's Farm, now "The Farmhouse" public house in Langshott Lane, Horley.

As a young man of 24, Goddard founded the practice of Theodore Goddard & Co in 1902. For some years, he practised on his own account from offices in Clement's Inn, close by the Law Courts. Working the London court circuit as a litigator, his reputation soon enabled him to attract as a valuable client the newly created office of The Public Trustee. With the growth of the practice, he moved to new offices in Sergeant's Inn in the Temple area of London in 1917.

== Growth of the practice ==
Over the next 30 years, there was further progress and by 1946 the firm of Theodore Goddard & Co had eight partners. John Theodore Goddard become known nationwide when, in 1936, he was instructed by Mrs Wallis Simpson (the late Duchess of Windsor) to act for her in her divorce proceedings. When King Edward VIII's intention to marry Mrs Simpson became known, Goddard became closely involved, at the behest of Prime Minister Stanley Baldwin, in the delicate abdication negotiations.

=== Role in the abdication ===
Following Mrs Simpson's divorce hearing on 27 October 1936, Goddard became concerned that there would be a "patriotic" citizen's intervention (a legal device to block the divorce), and that such an intervention would be successful. The courts could not grant a divorce by consent of both parties, and so the case was being handled as if it were an undefended at-fault divorce brought against Mr Simpson, with Mrs Simpson as the innocent, injured party. The divorce action would fail if the citizen's intervention showed that Mrs Simpson had colluded with her husband by, for example, conniving in or staging the appearance of his adultery so that she could marry someone else. On 7 December 1936, the King heard that Goddard planned to fly to the south of France to see his client. The King summoned him and expressly forbade him to make the journey, fearing the visit might put doubts in Mrs Simpson's mind. Goddard went straight to Downing Street to see Baldwin, as a result of which he was provided with an aeroplane to take him directly to Cannes.

Upon his arrival, Goddard warned his client that a citizen's intervention, should it arise, was likely to succeed. It was, according to Goddard, his duty to advise her to withdraw her divorce petition. Mrs Simpson refused, but they both telephoned the King to inform him that she was willing to give him up so that he could remain King. It was, however, too late; the King had already made up his mind to go even if he could not marry Mrs Simpson. Indeed, as the belief that the abdication was inevitable gathered strength, Goddard stated that: "[his] client was ready to do anything to ease the situation but the other end of the wicket [Edward VIII] was determined".

Goddard had a weak heart and had never flown before and so asked his doctor, William Kirkwood, to accompany him on the trip. As Kirkwood was a resident at a maternity hospital, his presence led to false speculation that Mrs Simpson was pregnant, and even that she was having an abortion. The press excitedly reported that the solicitor had flown to Mrs Simpson accompanied by a gynaecologist and an anaesthetist (who was actually the lawyer's clerk).

=== The practice generally ===
In 1941, the offices suffered a direct hit during a Blitz air raid and were completely destroyed, together with most of the firm's records and clients' papers. The firm then relocated to New Court, immediately behind the Law Courts, which remained its home until its move to the City of London in 1965.

John Theodore Goddard retired as Senior Partner in 1950 and died in 1952. However, the 1950s saw a period of further growth through amalgamation with, in particular, the City firm of Deacons & Pritchard (founded in 1834) and the firm of Rhys Roberts & Co (founded in 1883 by future Prime Minister David Lloyd George, a partner of the firm until his Parliamentary duties grew too burdensome).

The firm developed as a balanced general practice, with an emphasis on private client work. The firm was again caught up in one of the biggest political scandals in Britain in the 20th century (the Profumo affair). In 1963, then senior partner Derek Clogg was instructed by John Profumo. The solicitor was referred to in the Hansard transcripts of the House of Commons as "a solicitor of the highest reputation and widest experience" who "has had great experience in cases dealing with libel, with divorce and all those matters where human frailty and possible lying may come into account". The firm was similarly described as being "a very well known firm of London solicitors". However, in the late 1950s and early 1960s, Theodore Goddard & Co. attracted many company clients and the commercial side of the practice grew rapidly.

This led to the decision in 1965 to concentrate on this work and move to offices in St. Martin's Le Grand in the City of London.

Company, commercial and international work continued to increase during the next 20 years, by which time it had become the predominant part of the practice.

By the end of the 1980s the London office had grown to a total of over 300 staff with over 40 partners. This made it necessary to move offices again in 1990, this time to offices at 150 Aldersgate Street (which continued to form part of the London network of offices operated by the merged firm Addleshaw Goddard see below).

== The 1990s, 2000s and the merger ==
During the expansion of the practice throughout the 1990s, the firm at times experimented with international associate offices in Prague, Warsaw, Brussels and Paris amongst others. For a short time, there was also a small office run out of St. Albans.

Theodore Goddard continued to retain a strong media and entertainment law practice alongside a private client capability (including private tax work for members of The Rolling Stones, David Bowie and others, and defamation lawyers) at a time when many City law firms were divesting themselves of such business areas and concentrating on pure corporate matters. This diversity occasionally gave rise to high-profile cases involving celebrities including the firm's instruction in relation to the Hello! magazine dispute over photographs of Catherine Zeta-Jones's wedding to Michael Douglas and its appointment by Michael Jackson to advise on the controversial Living with Michael Jackson documentary.

Toward the end of the 1990s and the early part of the 21st century, the firm was linked to a succession of potential merger targets including a rejected offer from Eversheds in 1993 and a proposed tri-partite amalgamation in 1998 with Richards Butler and Denton Hall. However, following a third failed merger attempt in 2001, this time with Salans Hertzfeld & Heilbronn, the firm's credibility as a viable partnership was beginning to be called into question in both the legal press and the wider profession.

Consequently, in early 2003 (101 years after the firm was founded) following an approach by North of England firm Addleshaw Booth & Co, the fourth proposed merger was approved with very little resistance from the partnership. Five years on, the merger was described as "the most successful law firm merger since 2000". As of 2010 the merged firm of Addleshaw Goddard continued to operate out of offices in Leeds, Manchester and London.
