= Trevor Law Group =

American law firm

- Type: Private
- Industry: Legal services
- Founder: Trevor M. Law
- Defunct: 2003
- Fate: Dissolved
- Headquarters: Beverly Hills, California, U.S.
- Key people: Trevor M. Law

The Trevor Law Group was a Beverly Hills law firm that became the subject of legal and disciplinary proceedings following the useof California's Unfair Competition Law (Business and Professions Code section 17200) in lawsuits against thousands of small businesses.

In 2003, it was alleged that The Trevor Group engaged in a form of extortion by attempting to sue thousands of businesses for violating a now-defunct provision of the Business & Professions Code, then offering to settle for a few thousand dollars per settlement.

The proceedings surrounding the Trevor Law Group were reported in national and California media and contributed to broader public debate regarding the use of California's unfair competition statutes.

== Extortion allegations and investigation ==
In 2003, California Attorney General Bill Lockyer filed a civil suit that alleged improper use of the statute to obtain settlements from businesses who had been accused of technical violations of the Business & Professions Code.

The firm's activities were also investigated by the State Bar of California, which resulted in disciplinary proceedings against attorneys associated with the firm. The investigation was the largest in the history of the State Bar of California, and three principals of the firm were recommended for disbarment They subsequently resigned from their practice.

=== Legal context ===
At the time of the allegations, California's Unfair Competition Law permitted private entities to seek relief against businesses alleged to be violating state laws and regulations if the private entities were doing so in the public interest. The statute was used by private attorneys and organizations in the late 1990s through the early 2000s to pursue actions involving consumer protection and regulatory compliance.

=== Impact ===
The Trevor Law Group's litigation practices became a debate topic regarding appropriate use of the statute. Some critics suggested that some actions sought settlements from businesses facing minor or technical violations, while supporters of private enforcement maintained that the statute served an important role in supplementing government enforcement efforts.
