= Cayuga Correctional Facility =

Medium-security state prison in Moravia, New York, US

Coordinates: 42°43′19″N 76°23′47″W

- Interactive map of Cayuga Correctional Facility
- Location: 2202 New York 38A Moravia, New York
- Status: medium
- Capacity: 1082
- Managed by: New York State Department of Corrections and Community Supervision

The Cayuga Correctional Facility is a medium-security state prison for men located in Moravia, Cayuga County, New York, owned and operated by the New York State Department of Corrections and Community Supervision. The facility has a working capacity of 1082 inmates held at medium security.
