= Parker Chapin Flattau & Klimpl =

American law firm

- Headquarters: New York City
- Date founded: 1934
- Dissolved: 2001
- Website: www.pcfk.com

Parker Chapin Flattau & Klimpl was a New York City-based law firm that practiced from 1934 to 2001, when it merged with Dallas-based Jenkens & Gilchrist. It was a prominent mid-sized New York firm, often called a corporate and securities boutique because of its highly regarded middle market securities practice which also embraced securities litigation and arbitration. Its securities clients, according to electronic filings with the Securities and Exchange Commission, included Sbarro, Sotheby's and Logitech.

Parker Chapin was also known for its close association with New York City municipal law and real estate developments within the city. In 2007, a New York jury has ordered former Manhattan law firm Parker Chapin Flattau & Klimpl to pay $7 million in damages because one of its partners breached his fiduciary duties and cost his client a lucrative business deal. The firm numbered some 125 attorneys when it merged with Jenkens & Gilchrist to rebrand under the name Jenkens & Gilchrist Parker Chapin. In 2005, the Parker Chapin partners defected to open a New York office for the Atlanta firm Troutman Sanders. All together some 90 attorneys made the move, though the office remained in the same location, in the iconic Chrysler Building. The New York partners had become disenchanted by the massive liabilities that Jenkens was experiencing stemming from its tax shelter practice out of its Chicago office, which eventually led to the collapse of Jenkens.
