= Gunderson Dettmer Stough Villeneuve Franklin & Hachigian =

Law firm based in California

Gunderson Dettmer Stough Villeneuve Franklin & Hachigian LLP
- Headquarters: Redwood City, California
- No. of offices: 12
- No. of attorneys: 400
- Major practice areas: Corporate law, venture capital law, fund formation, M&A, capital markets, executive compensation, employment, privacy, tax, debt financing, and licensing, strategic partnerships and commercial transactions
- Date founded: 1995
- Company type: Limited liability partnership
- Website: gunder.com

Gunderson Dettmer Stough Villeneuve Franklin & Hachigian LLP (Gunderson Dettmer) is an international law firm headquartered in Silicon Valley in California. The firm focuses exclusively on business law and commercial matters for venture-backed and public technology and life science companies and venture capital investors, while performing no litigation work.

In addition to its headquarters in Redwood City, California, Gunderson Dettmer has offices in Ann Arbor, Atlanta, Austin, Boston, Los Angeles, New York, San Diego, San Francisco, Beijing, São Paulo, and Singapore.

== History ==
Gunderson Dettmer was founded in 1995 when a group of partners, led by Bob Gunderson and Scott Dettmer, left Brobeck, Phleger & Harrison's tech startup focused division to create a new firm. Gunderson had also earlier worked for Cooley LLP, where in the 80s he had been one of the first associates sent to Palo Alto to start the firm's Silicon Valley venture practice with partner Lee Benton.

== Growth ==
The firm grew rapidly along with the Dot-com bubble of the late 1990s, and by 1999, Gunderson Dettmer became notable for being the first law firm in the country to raise first-year associate salaries to $125,000. The firm was able to weather the collapse of the dot-com bubble and early 2000s recession to remain a significant player in the tech start-up field, even as Brobeck, Phleger & Harrison collapsed due to its practice of accepting equity as payment from start-ups, many of which wound up going bankrupt in the crash.

== Recognition ==
By the early 2010s, Gunderson Dettmer had become the top global law firm in venture funding by number of deals. In 2011, the Wall Street Journal reported that Gunderson Dettmer had surpassed Wilson Sonsini Goodrich & Rosati as the most active law firm in venture capital. In 2017, Pitchbook ranked Gunderson the most active venture capital law firm in the world, while Chambers and Partners observed that the firm, "displays dominance throughout the North American and Chinese venture capital fund formation markets."

During the 2022 collapse in emerging company valuations, the firm conducted two rounds of layoffs and deferred the start date of its 2022 class of first year associates. About 30 attorneys were affected. In April 2023, Gunderson cut an additional 10% of total headcount in a major layoff.
