= Adam Clayton Powell IV =

Puerto Rican politician (born 1962)

Member of the New York State Assembly from the 68th district
- In office January 1, 2001 – December 31, 2010
- Preceded by: Nelson Antonio Denis
- Succeeded by: Robert J. Rodriguez

Member of the New York City Council from the 8th district
- In office January 1, 1992 – December 31, 1997
- Preceded by: Carolyn Maloney
- Succeeded by: Phil Reed

Personal details
- Born: Adam Clayton Powell Diago; July 1962 (age 64) San Juan, Puerto Rico
- Spouse: Andrea Dial (divorced)
- Parents: Adam Clayton Powell Jr. (father); Yvette Diago Powell (mother)
- Relatives: Adam Clayton Powell III (half-brother)
- Education: Howard University (BA); Fordham University School of Law (JD)

Adam Clayton "A.C." Powell IV (born Adam Clayton Powell Diago; in 1962) is an American politician from the state of New York. He was a member of the New York State Assembly from 2001 to 2010. From 1992 to 1997, he served as New York City Council Member representing East Harlem and parts of the Upper West Side and the South Bronx. Beginning in 2001, Powell represented the 68th Assembly District, which includes parts of Harlem and East Harlem. He was defeated by Charles Rangel in the 2010 Democratic Primary for the seat of the 15th Congressional District.

== Early years ==
Powell was born to civil rights leader and former congressman Adam Clayton Powell Jr. and his third wife Yvette Diago in San Juan, Puerto Rico. He was named Adam Clayton Powell Diago, as is the Spanish naming custom of using the mother's surname as part of his official name. Powell's maternal grandfather Gonzalo Diago was a mayor of San Juan, Puerto Rico and served as such from 1941 to 1945. When his parents separated, Powell's mother was granted custody, and he was raised and educated in Puerto Rico.

In 1980, Powell moved to the mainland United States to study at Howard University in Washington, D.C.. He changed his surname by dropping his mother's surname "Diago". He then continued to use the name Adam Clayton Powell IV. This has caused confusion as his half-nephew, 8 years younger than he, was also named Adam Clayton Powell IV. He later earned a Juris Doctor degree from Fordham University School of Law in New York.

== Political career ==
Powell ran successfully for the New York City Council in 1991.

Powell actually lost the Democratic primary vote by 34 votes to William (Bill) Del Toro in a seven-person field. Del Toro and his brother Assemblyman Angelo Del Toro, were powerful players in East Harlem politics for two decades with Angelo as a powerful Assembly committee chairman. Powell sued for a new election. His Campaign Manager Geoffrey L. Garfield, spent a month at the Board of Elections combing through every registered voter card (“buff card”) to ascertain whether non-Democrats voted in the primary. They found over 1,000 voters whom did not properly check the “party affiliation” box on the form. Del Toro sued to stop the effort by declaring “defective service” of legal documents to Del Toro’s home. Powell was successful in a hearing with an Elections Department Referee; on appeal the lower Supreme Court reversed the decision. Powell appealed to the state’s Appellate division where a five-judge panel ruled in Powell’s favor and mandated a Special Election the following week. Powell won 73-27 percent of the vote. (Source: Geoffrey L. Garfield, Campaign Manager) In 1994, Powell challenged Representative Charles B. Rangel for his seat in the United States House of Representatives, but lost. In 1997, he ran for Manhattan borough president, but lost to C. Virginia Fields.

Powell worked for the Federal Emergency Management Agency (FEMA). In 2001, he participated and was arrested in the Vieques protests, which demanded the departure of the U.S. Navy from that island.

When Rangel retired in 2016, Powell ran again for the House seat. He lost to state Senator Adriano Espaillat.

== Family life ==
Powell married Andrea Dial, a former Ebony Fashion Fair model. They had a son, Adam Clayton Powell V, before divorcing in the mid-1990s.

Powell was a Co-Producer of “Keep the Faith, Baby!”, a Showtime/Paramount Television feature film on the life and career of his father Congressman Adam Clayton Powell Jr.

== Controversies ==
=== Fundraising ===
When Powell ran for Congress in 1994, he raised $64,000, 10% of which came from residents of his state, while the remainder were donated by contributors from Miami and New Jersey, including $5,000 from Free Cuba PAC, Inc., headed by leading Cuban-exile community figure Jorge Mas Canosa who made a $1000 personal donation to Powell.

=== Campaign funds ===
Powell spent $1,200 of his campaign funds traveling to Ireland. Powell said he accompanied several lawmakers on the Ireland trip, which was sponsored by the New York American-Irish Legislators Society as a means to raise awareness of the issues that affect the Irish community.

=== Vehicular charges ===
In 2008, Powell was arrested and charged for allegedly driving while intoxicated (DWI) on the Henry Hudson Parkway in New York City. He was acquitted of driving while intoxicated and found guilty of the lesser charge of driving while impaired. This charge is considered a traffic violation rather than a criminal conviction. One juror commented, "the whole thing is we didn't think he was drunk."

== Congressional race, 2010 ==
Powell lost to Charles Rangel in the 2010 primary for the 15th district.

== See also ==
- List of Puerto Ricans
- List of people from Harlem

Political offices
Preceded by Carolyn Maloney	New York City Council, 8th district 1992–1997	Succeeded by Philip Reed
New York State Assembly
Preceded by Nelson Antonio Denis	New York State Assembly, 68th District; 2001–2010	Succeeded by Robert J. Rodriguez
