= Locke Lord =

American law firm

Locke Lord LLP
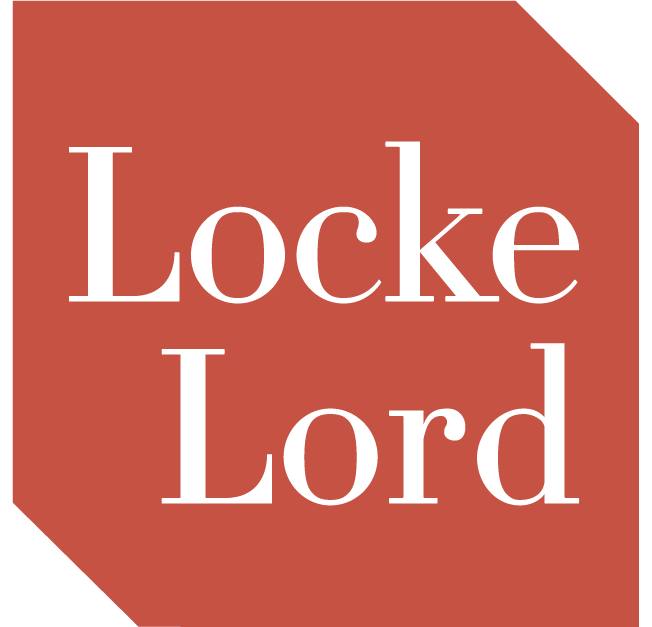
- Headquarters: Dallas, Texas
- No. of offices: 20
- No. of attorneys: 641
- Major practice areas: General Practice
- Key people: David Taylor (Chair); Jerry K. Clements (Chair emeritus)
- Date founded: October 2, 2007 (predecessor firms date from late 19th Century)
- Company type: Limited liability partnership
- Dissolved: January 1, 2025 (merged with Troutman Pepper Hamilton Sanders LLP)
- Website: www.lockelord.com

Locke Lord LLP was an American law firm formed on October 2, 2007, after the combination of Texas-based Locke Liddell & Sapp PLLC and Lord Bissell & Brook LLP. Locke Lord's earliest predecessor firms date from 1891 and 1914. The firm was headquartered in Dallas, Texas and changed its name to Locke Lord LLP on September 27, 2011.

In January 2025, they merged with Troutman Pepper Hamilton Sanders LLP, also known as Troutman Pepper, to become Troutman Pepper Locke.

== History ==
Locke Lord's origin traced back to a firm founded in Dallas by Maurice Locke in 1891. The firm became Locke & Locke when Maurice Locke's sons ran the practice, and his grandsons renamed it Locke Purnell. The predecessor of the Lord Bissell & Brook firm was founded in 1914, when John Lord started its predecessor in Chicago.

In 1999, Locke Liddell & Sapp was formed from the merger of two predecessor firms in Dallas and Houston. In May 2007, the management of both Locke Liddell & Sapp and Lord Bissell & Brook proposed a corporate merger. On September 12, 2007, the partnership of each firm approved the merger, effective October 2, 2007.

On January 10, 2015, the merger between Locke Lord and Edwards Wildman Palmer was completed. The deal combined roughly 1,600 lawyers across 33 U.S. offices, plus London and Brussels. The merged firm adopted the name Locke Lord, although legacy offices of Edwards Wildman Palmer used the name Locke Lord Edwards for a transition period. The firm employed 641 attorneys as of 2018.

On January 1, 2025, Locke Lord merged with Troutman Pepper Hamilton Sanders LLP to become Troutman Pepper Locke in a $1.6 billion merger.
