= Oppenhoff & Partner =

German commercial law firm

- Headquarters: Cologne, Germany
- No. of offices: Two
- No. of attorneys: 50
- Major practice areas: Legal advice
- Date founded: 1908 (Cologne)
- Company type: German partnership
- Website: www.oppenhoff.eu

Oppenhoff & Partner is a German commercial law firm specialised in the provision of legal advice to entrepreneurs and enterprises operating internationally. It has its seat in Cologne, is an independent partnership and is not affiliated to any network or other alliance.

== History ==
The office Oppenhoff & Partner was founded in 1908 in Cologne under the name Becker, Ströhmer and Lang. Walter Oppenhoff joined the firm in 1930 as named partner, led it through the World War II, inter alia as the alien property custodian of Coca-Cola, and expanded the firm in the post-war years.

The following office partners Boden, Oppenhoff and Schneider have exerted a considerable influence on the German laws governing the legal profession. In 1989, they successfully fought for the right to set up nationwide partnerships before the Federal Court of Justice of Germany, resulting in the establishment of the partnership Oppenhoff & Rädler in the mid 1990s.

In the year 2001, the firm merged with the English commercial law firm Linklaters. Since January 2008 Oppenhoff & Partner has returned to being an independent partnership situated in Cologne, with about 150 employees, including 65 lawyers. In 2013, the firm expands to a second office in Frankfurt. Partners of the preceding partnership Oppenhoff & Rädler set up the Walter Oppenhoff Foundation in honour of its founding member of the same name.

== Main practice areas ==
Oppenhoff & Partner's main practice areas are:

- Corporate Law / Mergers & Acquisitions
- Tax Law
- Employment Law
- Corporate Insurance
- Real Estate Law
- Intellectual Property Law
- Information, Technology & Communications (IT&C)
- Public Law / Regulatory
- Litigation and Arbitration
- Antitrust law
- Compliance Group

== Notable mandates ==
- Advised US Automotive Group Johnson Controls on the acquisition of Westfalia Profiltechnik in Germany (July 2008).
- Advised international engineering and construction group Balfour Beatty on the acquisition of the German rail construction Schreck-Mieves group (June 2008).
- Advising M. DuMont Schauberg, the fourth largest German newspaper publisher, on the takeover of Berliner Zeitung, the highest-circulated daily newspaper in the capital (January 2009).
- Frowein & Co. Beteiligungs AG, a company specialised in company holdings in small and medium-sized businesses, has taken over the S.I.M.E.O.N. Group in Tuttlingen. S.I.M.E.O.N., a medical engineering company supported by Oppenhoff & Partner (December 2008).
- A partner of the firm advised Schaeffler Group during their takeover attempt of Continental AG.
