= Troutman Pepper =

American law firm

Troutman Pepper Hamilton Sanders LLP
- Headquarters: Bank of America Plaza; Atlanta, Georgia, US
- No. of offices: 23
- No. of attorneys: 1,200
- Major practice areas: General practice, construction, energy/renewable energy, financial services, health care, insurance, and private equity.
- Key people: Tom Cole (Chairman), Amie Colby (Managing Partner)
- Revenue: ▲$1,029,503,000 (2022)
- Date founded: 1897 (as Walter T. Colquitt Esq., later Troutman Sanders); July 1, 2020 (merger with Pepper Hamilton and adoption of current name)
- Founder: Walter T. Colquitt
- Company type: Limited liability partnership
- Website: troutman.com

Troutman Pepper Hamilton Sanders LLP, known as Troutman Pepper, was an American law firm with more than 1,200 attorneys located in 23 U.S. cities as of 2024. In terms of revenue, Troutman Pepper placed 47th on The American Lawyer's 2022 AmLaw 100 rankings of U.S. law firms, with $1,029,503,000 in gross revenue in 2021.

In January 2025, Troutman Pepper merged with Locke Lord to become Troutman Pepper Locke.

== History ==
On July 1, 2020, Troutman Sanders merged with Pepper Hamilton to become Troutman Pepper. Stephen E. Lewis of Troutman Sanders was the firm's managing partner and became chair of Troutman Pepper after the merger.

=== Troutman Sanders ===
Troutman Sanders was founded in 1897 in Atlanta as the law practice of Walter T. Colquitt. Colquitt was well known in Atlanta near the end of the 19th century for his representation of the Georgia Railway and Electric Company, which would later become the Georgia Power Company.

In 1930, Colquitt formed a partnership with two brothers, Henry and Robert Troutman, both lawyers with clients such as Gulf Refining Company, the Georgia Real Estate Commission and the National Surety Company. Additionally, Colquitt had two other attorneys, Robert S. Parker and Preston Stanley Arkwright Jr., join the firm creating Colquitt, Parker, Troutman and Arkwright. For the next 30 years, the firm grew in size, reputation, and client base, and went through a few name changes as partnerships were formed and broken. By the late 1960s, the firm was known as Troutman Sams Schroder & Lockerman.

In 1971, then-president of Georgia Power, Ed Hatch, suggested the merger of Troutman Sams Schroder & Lockerman with former Governor Carl Sanders' firm, Sanders Ashmore & Boozer. Hatch believed the merger would keep intact the decades of utility expertise of the Troutman firm, while merging the fresh talent and energy of Sanders’ young firm. The new firm would operate as Troutman Sanders Lockerman & Ashmore, until shortened to Troutman Sanders in 1992 when the firm moved from downtown Atlanta's Candler Building to Midtown Atlanta's new 55-story Bank of America Plaza.

From 1993 to 2015, Robert W. Webb Jr. served as managing partner, while the firm experienced growth in the United States and internationally. In 2001, Troutman Sanders merged with Mays & Valentine LLP, which added 150 attorneys to the firm and offices in Richmond, Tysons Corner, and Virginia Beach, Virginia. This spurred further growth and the subsequent opening of offices in Raleigh, NC (2003) and New York City with the acquisition of the New York office of Jenkens & Gilchrist Parker Chapin LLP in 2005.

In 2006, Carl Sanders retired and Webb became the firm's chairman and managing partner while Sanders served as chairman emeritus until his death in 2014. In 2009, the firm merged with D.C.-based Ross Dixon & Bell. Troutman Sanders grew to 15 offices after the merger, adding Chicago, Orange County, San Diego, and doubling its D.C. presence. This brought the total number of attorneys to over 650.

In 2011, Stephen E. Lewis became the managing partner. In 2015, Webb retired and Lewis became chairman as well. The firm continued to expand, with offices opened in 2014 in Charlotte and in 2015 in San Francisco.

Before merging with Pepper Hamilton in 2020, Troutman Sanders was organized into 17 areas of legal practice within five departments: Corporate, Real Estate & Finance, Business Litigation, Specialized Litigation, and Energy and Regulatory.

A number of notable lawyers and alumni were associated with the firm.

- Mark Howard Cohen, judge for the United States District Court for the Northern District of Georgia
- Frank Hanna III, Catholic entrepreneur and philanthropist
- Harold Melton, former Chief Justice of the Georgia Supreme Court
- Carl E. Sanders, former Governor of Georgia
- Charles Peeler, former United States Attorney
- Patty Shwartz, judge for the United States Court of Appeals for the Third Circuit

During its history, Troutman Sanders was known by a number of names:

- Walter T. Colquitt, Esq. (1897)
- Colquitt and Lumpkin (1897–1904)
- Colquitt and Conyers (1904–1917)
- Colquitt, Conyers and Latimer (1918–1930)
- Colquitt, Parker, Troutman and Arkwright (1930–1935)
- Colquitt, MacDougald, Troutman and Arkwright (1935–1937)
- MacDougald, Troutman and Arkwright (1937–1947)
- MacDougald, Troutman, Sams and Branch (1947–1949)
- MacDougald, Troutman, Sams and Schroder (1949–1953)
- Troutman, Sams, Schroder and Lockerman (1953–1971)
- Troutman, Sanders, Lockerman and Ashmore (1971–1992)
- Troutman Sanders LLP (1992–July 2020)

=== Pepper Hamilton ===
Pepper Hamilton dates its founding to 1890 when former U.S. Senator George Wharton Pepper began his legal practice in Philadelphia. Pepper's essays on conflicts of laws were cited by Justice Brandeis in the landmark ruling Erie Railroad v. Tompkins (1938). Pepper was also instrumental in Supreme Court arguments that led to many New Deal provisions being struck down as beyond the Federal Government's commerce power.

In 1954, the Pepper firm and another Philadelphia law firm — Evans, Bayard & Frick — merged as Pepper, Bodine, Frick, Scheetz & Hamilton creating a 35-lawyer entity. This merger brought in some aspects of the legacy of John G. Johnson (ob. 1917), a solo practitioner, and an eminent antitrust lawyer who had represented Standard Oil and U.S. Steel, argued 168 cases before the U.S. Supreme Court, and was called the greatest lawyer in the English speaking world in his New York Times obituary. In 1955, shortly after the merger of the Pepper and Evans firms, George Wharton Pepper retired from practice because of failing health. He was succeeded as chairman of the firm by John D. M. Hamilton, who was chairman of the Republican National Committee in 1940. In 1960, another merger brought in the firm of Moffett, Frye & Leopold. The firm grew significantly in the 1980s, 1990s and 2000s.

In 2007, the partnership elected Nina M. Gussack as chairwoman of Pepper's Executive Committee, the first woman to be elected to that position. Pepper partner A. Michael Pratt became the Philadelphia Bar Association’s 81st Chancellor in 2008. He was the third African-American to serve in that office since the Association’s founding in 1802.

== Events since Pepper Hamilton merger ==
In 2021, the firm partnered with the University of Richmond School of Law as the "innovator-in-residence" for the university's Legal Business Design Challenge, a course that allows law students to identify business opportunities or improve client services for law firms.

On December 20, 2021, its attorneys successfully overturned the wrongful conviction of Devonia Inman, who spent 23 years in prison for a murder in South Georgia.

On February 9, 2023 it was reported the organization was a target of a cyberattack: “We can confirm that on Feb. 8 Troutman Pepper was a target of a cyberattack,” the firm said in a statement. “Following our established protocols, we took immediate action to contain the threat and inspect thoroughly before we restore systems access.”

In 2024, Troutman Pepper was named a recipient of a HIAS Pennsylvania Golden Door Award, in recognition of activities that include the provision of pro bono services to low-income immigrants, refugees, and asylum seekers.

In September 2024, it was announced that Troutman Pepper and Locke Lord would be merging effective January 1, 2025. The new law firm took the name Troutman Pepper Locke LLP.

== See also ==
- List of largest law firms by profits per partner
