= Addleshaw Booth & Co =

English law firm

- Headquarters: Manchester, United Kingdom
- Major practice areas: General practice
- Date founded: 1997
- Company type: Partnership
- Dissolved: 1 May 2003

Addleshaw Booth & Co was an English law firm which merged with Theodore Goddard in May 2003 to form Addleshaw Goddard.

== History ==
Addleshaw Booth & Co traces its roots back to the very first public record of solicitors in the UK – the Law List – published in 1775.

Nicholas Smith founds the firm in 1775, and Samuel Lister Booth is admitted as a solicitor in 1823. The successors of these practices combined over the years to become Booth, Clough & Booth in 1869. Further amalgamations lead to the firm becoming Booth & Co based in Leeds. in c.1936. John William Addleshaw begins legal practice in 1857 and enters partnership with William Warburton in 1873. The firm becomes Addleshaw & Sons in 1904, and then Addleshaw Sons & Latham in 1917 based in Manchester.

Addleshaw Booth & Co was formed in 1997 by a merger between the Leeds-based Booth & Co. and the Manchester-based Addleshaw Sons & Latham. Addleshaw Booth was a 'heavyweight' in the North of England legal sector, with offices in Leeds and Manchester. Its local standing, amongst other things, led to the firm's high-profile appointment as the official lawyers to the 2002 Commonwealth Games.

Addleshaw Booth was the employer of Sally Clark (and also her husband), the solicitor wrongly convicted of murdering her two sons in 1999.

It was a member of the Norton Rose M5 alliance, which disbanded in 1998.

However, the firm's small office in London, and its failure to garner City-based clients, led to the tie-up with Theodore Goddard in the spring of 2003 to become Addleshaw Goddard. Seen by many commentators in the legal sector as a takeover, the majority of the management board of the new firm were made up of Addleshaw Booth & Co's partners.
