= Cooley LLP =

American international law firm

- Headquarters: Palo Alto, California
- No. of offices: 17
- No. of attorneys: 1,072 (2020)
- Major practice areas: Corporate, Litigation, Intellectual Property, Regulatory
- Key people: Rachel Proffitt (CEO)
- Revenue: ▲$2 billion (2022)
- Date founded: 1920 in San Francisco
- Company type: Limited liability partnership
- Website: cooley.com

Cooley LLP is an American international law firm, headquartered in Palo Alto, California, with offices worldwide. The firm's practice areas include corporate, litigation, intellectual property, fund formation, public markets, employment, life sciences, clean technology, real estate, financial services, retail, regulatory and energy.

Cooley is particularly known for its technology and life sciences practices as well as its experience with marquee initial public offerings (IPOs) and deep-rooted venture capital connections & financing.

== History ==
Cooley was founded by Arthur Cooley and Louis Crowley in 1920 in San Francisco. In 1958, Cooley formed Draper, Gaither and Anderson, the first venture capital partnership organized on the West Coast. In the 1950s, Cooley formed Raychem and National Semiconductor. In 1971 the firm (then Cooley, Crowley, Gaither, Godward, Castro & Huddleson) began representing Disney in the copyright and trademark infringement case Walt Disney Productions v. Air Pirates. In the early 1980s, the firm took both Genentech and Amgen public. In the late 1980s, the firm relocated its offices from San Francisco to Palo Alto. In 1989, the firm (then Cooley, Godward, Castro, Huddleson & Tatum) facilitated the IPO of Qualcomm. The firm incorporated NVIDIA in 1993 and later took the company public in 1999. In 1995, two former partners of the firm, Robert Gunderson and Scott Dettmer, formed the law firm of Gunderson Dettmer.

On October 31, 2006, the firm (then Cooley Godward) merged with Kronish Lieb Weiner & Hellman, which resulted in the firm growing from 440 lawyers to 550. In the announcement of the merger, The New York Times referred to Cooley as a "Leading Silicon Valley law firm".

Like many other law firms, Cooley laid off 114 people in 2009 from its offices, citing "the uncertain economy". After aggressive hiring to meet "soaring demand" in 2020 and 2021, Cooley concluded that several of its practices were "substantially overbuilt" as demand for the firm's services did not grow as much in 2022. Cooley responded by laying off 150 employees in late 2022, instituting a hiring freeze, and delaying the start date for incoming associates from November 2023 to January 2024. Cooley then offered incoming associate hires for its corporate practice the option to start in January 2024, or to delay their start date by another year in exchange for a $100,000 stipend.

== Offices ==
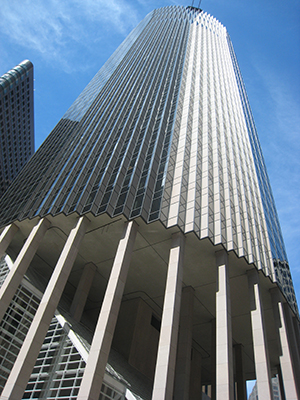
Cooley's San Francisco office at 101 California Street

Cooley has offices in thirteen U.S. cities, London, Shanghai, Beijing, Hong Kong, Brussels, and Singapore.

Cooley launched in London in January 2015, creating a 55-lawyer practice and the firm's first office in Europe. Its lawyers were hired from the London offices of Morrison & Foerster and Edwards Wildman Palmer, raiding the latter's entire office. The office is run by Justin Stock who headed the corporate department of Morrison & Foerster's London office before joining Cooley.

The firm launched its Beijing office in 2018.

== Recognition ==
Cooley was recognized in 2017 as the highest ranking of the five law firms then listed on Fortune's 100 Best Companies to Work For.

In 2018, Crain's New York recognized Cooley on its 100 Best Places to Work in New York City list as the #4 best large company and the #1 law firm. In the same year, Fortune recognized Cooley on its Best Workplaces in New York list, designating the firm in the top 10 of all large companies in the state.

In 2024, the firm placed 25th among U.S. firms in the National Law Journal NLJ 500, 19th in The American Lawyer's AM Law 200, and 25th globally in the Global 200 survey of the world's highest grossing law firms.

In 2025, China Business Law Journal (CBLJ) honored Cooley in its China Business Law Awards 2025, which recognize the best Chinese and international law firms in various practice area categories for the Chinese market.

The American Lawyer jointly named Cooley Law Firm of the Year in 2025, among eight firms, four of which were honored for successful challenges to executive orders, and four others for legal representations of those firms.

== See also ==
- List of largest United States-based law firms by profits per partner
