= Oblon =

Law firm in Virginia, United States

Oblon, McClelland, Maier & Neustadt, L.L.P.
- Headquarters: Alexandria, Virginia, United States
- Offices: Alexandria, Virginia; Tokyo, Japan
- Major practice areas: Intellectual property law (patent prosecution, trademark prosecution, litigation, Post-Grant Proceedings)
- Key people: Philippe Signore (Managing Partner)
- Date founded: 1968
- Founders: Norman F. Oblon
- Website: www.oblon.com

Oblon, McClelland, Maier & Neustadt, L.L.P. (often abbreviated to Oblon) is an intellectual property law firm in Alexandria, Virginia. Founded in 1968 by Norman F. Oblon, Oblon is one of the largest law firms in the United States focusing exclusively on intellectual property law. The law firm performs trademark and patent prosecution, as well as litigation and Post-Grant Proceedings before the Patent Trial and Appeal Board (PTAB). The firm has been ranked first among law firms based on the number of utility patent applications filed per annum for 27 years.

Attorneys at Oblon include Arthur Neustadt, who argued successfully before the Supreme Court of the United States on behalf of respondent Shoketsu Kinzoku K.K. in the case of Festo Corp. v. Shoketsu Kinzoku Kogyo Kabushiki Co., as well as Charles "Chico" Gholz, in the field of patent interference practice. One of the attorneys at Oblon was Scott McKeown, who represented eBay, PayPal, and Square in cases before the PTAB.

Philippe Signore is the firm's Managing Partner and a patent attorney.
