= Waesche, Sheinbaum & O'Regan =

- Headquarters: New York City
- Key people: Donald M. Waesche, Jr., Louis P. Sheinbaum and Francis M. O'Regan (founders)
- Date founded: 1979
- Dissolved: 2011
- Website: www.waeschelaw.com

Waesche, Sheinbaum & O'Regan was a New York-based law firm focusing on international litigation and arbitration. It was co-founded in 1979 by Donald M. Waesche, Jr., Louis P. Sheinbaum and Francis M. O'Regan, partners from the Wall Street firm of Bigham, Englar, Jones & Houston.

The firm litigated cases involving the carriage of goods by sea and air, insurance, reinsurance, international personal jurisdiction, the doctrine of forum non conveniens, the Federal Arbitration Act, the Foreign Sovereign Immunities Act, and the application of international treaties. It ceased operations in 2011.

== Cases ==
Trans World Air Lines, Inc. v. Franklin Mint Corp., 466 U.S. 243 (1984)

Anglo-Iberia Underwriting Mgmt. Co. v. PT Jamsostek (Persero), 235 Fed.Appx. 776 (2d Cir. 2007), subsequent appeal at 600 F.3d 171 (2d Cir. 2010)

Mobil Shipping & Transportation Co. v. Wonsild Liquid Carriers Ltd., 190 F.3d 64 (2d Cir. 1999)

Citrus Marketing Board of Israel v. J. Lauritzen A/S, 943 F.2d 220 (2d Cir. 1991)

Lerakoli, Inc. v. Pan American World Airways, Inc., 783 F.2d 33 (2d Cir. 1986)

Irish National Ins. Co., Ltd. v. Aer Lingus Teoranta, 739 F.2d 90 (2d Cir. 1984)

Amoco Egypt Oil Co. v. Leonis Navigation Co., 1 F.3d 848 (9th Cir. 1993)

American Home Assurance Co. v. Masters' Ships Management S.A., 423 F.Supp.2d 193 (S.D.N.Y. 2006)

Alvenus Shipping Co., Ltd. v. Delta Petroleum (U.S.A.) Ltd., 876 F.Supp. 482 (S.D.N.Y. 1994)

Application of Technostroyexport, 853 F.Supp. 695 (S.D.N.Y. 1994)

Eaglet Corp., Ltd. v. Banco Central de Nicaragua, 839 F.Supp. 232 (S.D.N.Y. 1993)

Matter of Exportkhleb, 790 F.Supp. 70 (S.D.N.Y. 1992)

Arbitration between Keystone Shipping Co and Texport Oil Co., 782 F.Supp. 28 (S.D.N.Y. 1992)

Misr Ins. Co. v. M/V Har Sinai, 480 F.Supp. 398 (S.D.N.Y. 1979)
