= Finnegan, Henderson, Farabow, Garrett & Dunner =

American international intellectual property firm

Finnegan, Henderson, Farabow, Garrett & Dunner, LLP
- Headquarters: Washington, D.C.
- No. of offices: 13
- Offices: Atlanta; Boston; Dallas; Herzliya; London; Munich; Palo Alto; Reston, Virginia; Seoul; Shanghai; Taipei; Tokyo; Washington, D.C.
- No. of attorneys: ~300
- Major practice areas: Intellectual property
- Key people: James Barney, Managing Partner
- Revenue: $349,205,000 (2021)
- Date founded: March 1, 1965
- Founder: Marc Finnegan and Douglas Henderson
- Company type: Limited Liability Partnership
- Website: www.finnegan.com

Finnegan, Henderson, Farabow, Garrett & Dunner LLP, commonly known as Finnegan, is an American multinational law firm based in Washington, D.C. that specializes in intellectual property law. Finnegan was founded on March 1, 1965, by Marc Finnegan and Douglas Henderson in Washington, DC. It is one of the largest law firms that focuses exclusively on the practice of intellectual property law, practicing all aspects of patent, trademark, copyright, and trade secret law, including counseling, prosecution, licensing, and litigation. Finnegan (known as Finnegan Europe LLP in the United Kingdom and the Fei Han Foreign Affairs Law Firm in Taiwan), also represents clients on IP issues related to U.S. and European patents and trademarks, international trade, portfolio management, the Internet, e-commerce, government contracts, antitrust, and unfair competition.

== Recognition ==
Finnegan has been consistently ranked one of the most prestigious law firms for intellectual property in the world. As such, Finnegan is among the most competitive firms for incoming associates, who usually possess advanced degrees in engineering and science in addition to a Juris Doctor degree. In 2019, the firm employed more than 40 former U.S. Federal Circuit clerks.

- Named “Intellectual Property Firm of the Year” (Benchmark Litigation, 2026)
- Placed top 100 by Working Mother magazine since 2011.
- Chosen as “U.S. Specialty Firm of the Year,” 2016, 2018, 2020 (Managing Intellectual Property Americas IP Awards)
- Awarded “U.S. Post-Grant Firm of the Year,” 2020 (Law Business Research Global IP Awards)
- Ranked #1 in six out of seven IP categories, more than any other law firm. (The Legal 500, 2019)
- Ranked as a Tier 1 law firm in more than a dozen U.S. and international IP categories. (IAM Patent 1000, 2019)
- Named “D.C. Intellectual Property Litigation Department of the Year” (The National Law Journal, 2018, 2019)
- Named "U.S. PTAB Firm of the Year" (Managing Intellectual Property, 2019)
- Named “Intellectual Property Boutique Firm of the Year” (LMG Life Sciences Awards, 2019)
- Named “Practice Group of the Year” in Intellectual Property (Law360, 2017, 2019)
- “Law Firm of the Year—Trademark,” 2019 (U.S. News—Best Lawyers Best Law Firms)
