= Fish & Richardson =

Law firm

- No. of offices: 13
- No. of attorneys: 400+
- Major practice areas: IP Litigation, Commercial Litigation, Patent, Post-Grant, Trademark, Copyright, Regulatory
- Key people: John Adkisson (President)
- Revenue: $400.87 million (2012)
- Date founded: 1878
- Company type: Professional Corporation
- Website: www.fr.com

Fish & Richardson P.C. is a global patent, intellectual property, and commercial litigation law firm with more than 400 attorneys and technology specialists across the US and Europe. Fish is active in both patent litigation and patent prosecution services among Fortune 100 companies. Fish has been named the U.S. Firm of the Year in three categories: Patent Contentious, Life Sciences IP Litigation, and PTAB by Managing Intellectual Property (MIP) magazine.

Founded in Boston in 1878, Fish represented numerous American inventors of the late 19th and early 20th centuries, including Alexander Graham Bell, Thomas Edison, and the Wright Brothers. The firm now has 14 offices in the United States, Germany, and China.

In February 2020, the company named John Adkisson as president and CEO.

== Recognition ==
- Band 1 US Rankings for IP and ITC, Chambers Global, 2015-2021
- IP Practice Group of the Year, Law360, 2012 – 2016, 2018 2020 – 2021
- Top National Ranking – Patent Litigation, IAM Patent 1000, 2012 – 2021
- Top 10 Firm, Associate Career Development, Chambers USA, 2021
- IP Boutique Firm of the Year, Managing Intellectual Property, 2021
- Top Trademark Firm, World Trademark Review, 2011-2021
- ITC Firm of the Year, Managing Intellectual Property, 2019-2021
- Number 1 Law Firm at the PTAB, Managing Intellectual Property, 2018–2021
- One of America's Top Trusted Corporate Law Firms – IP, Forbes, 2019
- Hall of Fame, Corporate Counsel, 2019
- US Patent Litigation Firm of the Year, IAM & WTR Global IP Awards, 2019
- Appellate Hot List, The National Law Journal, 2011–2019
- IP Firm of the Year, National Impact Case of the Year, Benchmark Litigation, 2019

== Notable alumni ==
- Bainbridge Wadleigh, partner from 1878 to 1885.
- Frederick Perry Fish, Founder of the firm and president of American Telephone & Telegraph Corporation from 1901 to 1907.
- James J. Storrow, partner from 1890 to 1900, during which time the firm was known as Fish, Richardson & Storrow.
