= Winstead PC =

American law firm

- Headquarters: Dallas, Texas
- No. of offices: 9
- No. of attorneys: 307 (2025)
- Date founded: 1973; 53 years ago
- Company type: Professional corporation
- Website: winstead.com

Winstead PC is an American corporate law firm headquartered in Dallas, Texas. Other offices exist in cities across Texas, Tennessee New York, and North Carolina. As of 2025, the firm had 307 attorneys who advise and provide legal services to industries such as real estate, financial services, investment management and private funds, higher education and P3, airlines, healthcare and life sciences, sports business, and wealth management.

== History ==
Winstead was established in 1973 by three attorneys from Dallas, including the current name partner, the late Pete Winstead (1945–2023). During the late 1980s, the firm expanded its Dallas-based operations to encompass over 170 attorneys, established additional offices in both Houston and Austin, and increased the number of services offered. Winstead also acquired existing firms in Fort Worth and The Woodlands, Texas.
