= Edwards Wildman Palmer =

American law firm

Edwards Wildman Palmer LLP
- Headquarters: Providence, Rhode Island, United States
- Number of locations: 15
- Website: www.edwardswildman.com

Edwards Wildman was a law firm based in Providence, Rhode Island. It was formed from the 2011 merger of Edwards Angell Palmer & Dodge and Wildman, Harrold, Allen & Dixon.

Edwards Angell Palmer & Dodge had been formed by the 2005 merger of Edwards & Angell LLP and Palmer & Dodge LLP. In 2008, Boston-based Edwards Angell Palmer & Dodge also merged with London-based Kendall Freeman, a 40-attorney firm with specialties in dispute resolution, litigation, and both contentious and regulatory insurance and reinsurance.

Edwards Wildman had 15 offices in the U.S., Europe, and Asia.

On January 10, 2015, the merger between Locke Lord and Edwards Wildman Palmer became official and the merged firm is now known as Locke Lord LLP.

== Practice areas ==
Edwards Wildman attorneys practiced in the areas of antitrust/competition, business law, cross border, debt finance and capital markets, environmental, insurance and reinsurance, intellectual property, labor and employment, litigation, privacy and data protection, private client, public finance, public policy and government relations, real estate, restructuring and insolvency, tax, benefits and compensation, and technology, media, and telecommunications.

The attorneys at Edwards Wildman focus on corporate and financial transactions, complex litigation, intellectual property, and insurance and reinsurance. Particular areas of strength include venture capital and private equity. Edwards Wildman has over 125 years of experience, working with Fortune 500, FTSE 250 clients and start-up companies.

== Representative Matters ==
In August 2012, Edwards Wildman acted as legal adviser to Thomson Reuters in Connecticut's first captive insurer. The firm's role in the establishment of the first captive insurance company in Connecticut sparked widespread media coverage. Edwards Wildman also advised Stanley Black & Decker when it moved its captive insurer to Connecticut from Vermont, becoming Connecticut's second licensed captive.

Shawn Elliot Atkinson, a partner at Edwards Wildman and co-chair of cross border, led a cross border team on the sale of GTS Central Europe to Deutsche Telekom, for approximately $900 million.

Al Sokol, a partner at Edwards Wildman, advised two start-up biotech companies on an innovative approach to structuring, converting them from C corporations to limited liability companies. Sokol gave a presentation on this new structure.

Edwards Wildman had a debt finance and capital markets practice that represents global financial institutions, banks, finance companies, insurance companies, hedge funds, and other institutional lenders.

Stephen Huggard, partner and chair of Edwards Wildman's white collar and government enforcement practice group, represented Mark Philip, the former president of Hopkinton, Mass.-based Stryker Biotech, following two indictments; charges were dropped as of February 2, 2012. Edwards Wildman was commended in the Financial Times 2012 survey of most innovative law firms in recognition of the firm's defense of Mark Philip, the former president of Stryker Biotech, against Federal Drug Administration charges that included wire fraud.

Darlene Alt and Robert DiUbaldo, two attorneys in Edwards Wildman's Insurance and Reinsurance Department, discussed critical business questions in the aftermath of Superstorm Sandy in Insurance Journal. Alt and DiUbaldo analyzed the business impact of Sandy and how corporations and small- to medium-sized businesses are recovering.

David Bogan, a partner in Edwards Wildman's Hartford office, explained the details of Ct. Gov. Dannel Malloy's new Comprehensive Energy Strategy for Connecticut and what steps need to be taken for it to be successful. David Bogan's practice focuses on utility and energy regulatory issues.

Attorneys in Edwards Wildman's Private Client Group examined trends in charitable giving and whether it would be preferable to make a substantial gift in 2012 or wait until 2013 with potential tax law changes around the corner. TheStreet cited Edwards Wildman's analysis in a December 2012 article.

Edwards Wildman partner Becket McGrath analyzes planned changes to the criminal cartel offense in the UK. McGrath also explains why US companies active in the UK should be paying attention to the recent changes of the criminal cartel offense.

Edwards Wildman is a sponsor of several startup contests and organizations including the MIT $100K Entrepreneurship Competition. The firm is also a sponsor of TiE Boston. Alden Zecha, CFO & Strategist of Sproxil, Inc., explained how the Edwards Wildman HIT Program has helped his company thrive. Boris Revsin, Founder and CEO of Dailybreak, commented on how the Edwards Wildman HIT Program assisted the growth of Dailybreak (formerly known as CampusLIVE). Richard Kimball, co-chair of Edwards Wildman's Technology practice and founder of the firm's HIT program, was honored as an Outstanding Partner to TiE-Boston Programs for his contributions to the organization's bootcamps and conference planning in 2012. Edwards Wildman's Helping Innovators Thrive (HIT) program was lauded for providing top-level legal counsel to entrepreneurs in Dr. David Greenwald's lecture on entrepreneurship at Tufts University.

== Recognition ==
The Financial Times announced on November 28, 2012, that Edwards Wildman had earned a spot on the "commended" list of litigation practices in its 2012 list of "most innovative law firms" in recognition of the firm's defense of Mark Philip, the former president of Stryker Biotech, against Federal Drug Administration charges that included wire fraud.

Reactions magazine, a leading insurance publication, named Edwards Wildman "Best Global Law Firm of the Year" at its Global Awards in September 2012. The firm was also recognized as first in the US for overall law firm and in the areas of regulation and insolvency in the US, as well as in litigation in the London market; second in reinsurance in the US and in the London market; and third in litigation in the US and in regulation in Bermuda.

Edwards Wildman received the award of "London Office of the Year" at the British Legal Awards 2012, which are organized by Legal Week. The firm was selected for successfully executing strategic mergers, hiring key lateral partners to significantly expand the office, providing entrepreneurs with the opportunity to grow through Edwards Wildman's "Helping Innovators Thrive" program, and maintaining its long-standing commitment to pro bono and corporate responsibility. Edwards Wildman's London office has doubled its client base and revenue since 2008 and has expanded from 60 fee earners in 2008 to more than 90 today.

In February 2012, Legal Business UK shortlisted Edwards Wildman in the category of "US Law Firm of the Year." In May 2012, The Lawyer shortlisted Edwards Wildman in the category of "International Law Firm of the Year."

Chambers USA ranked Edwards Wildman attorneys or practices in the following categories in its 2012 edition: insurance, corporate/M&A, antitrust, bankruptcy/restructuring, private equity, environment, intellectual property, litigation, technology, banking & finance, public finance, healthcare, real estate, tax, privacy & data security and labor & employment.

In 2013, Chambers UK ranked Edwards Wildman Palmer UK LLP attorneys or practices in the following categories: insurance, competition/European law, dispute resolution, employment, intellectual property, private equity: venture capital investment, public international law and restructuring/insolvency.

Edwards Wildman was named to BTI's Client Service A-Team for 2013, a ranking which identifies top law firms for client service through a national survey of corporate counsel.

US News/Best Lawyers recognized Edwards Wildman in 62 practice areas in its 2013 survey of "Best Law Firms", including litigation, intellectual property, insurance, tax, banking and finance, public finance, education law, trusts and estates law, mergers & acquisitions, private equity and corporate governance, among others.

Edwards Wildman earned a perfect score in the 2013 Corporate Equality Index and Best Places to Work Survey from the Human Rights Campaign for the fifth consecutive year.

The Legal 500 UK recommended Edwards Wildman's London office in 17 categories in its 2012 edition, including in corporate and commercial, dispute resolution, finance, insurance, technology, media and telecoms, and transportation.

== Diversity ==
Paulette Brown served as the firm's Chief diversity officer; she is a Madison, N.J.-based partner in Edwards Wildman's labor and employment practice group. Brown spoke on an ABA panel about implicit bias in August 2012. Brown was elected the president of the American Bar Association and served August 2015 to August 2016. Brown was the first woman of color to lead the American Bar Association. A longtime advocate for diversity, Brown will be the ABA's sixth woman president since its inception in 1878 and the third African-American.

Emily Yu, an associate in Edwards Wildman's Real Estate Department, was named a 2013 "Up & Coming Lawyer" by Massachusetts Lawyers Weekly.
