= Lyon & Lyon =

Lyon & Lyon LLP
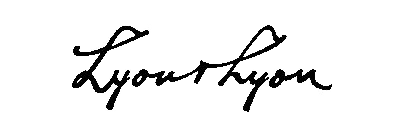
- No. of offices: 6
- No. of attorneys: 100+
- No. of employees: 250 (est.)
- Major practice areas: Intellectual property
- Date founded: 1919
- Founder: Frederick Saxton Lyon
- Company type: Limited liability partnership
- Dissolved: August 31, 2002 (bankruptcy)

Lyon & Lyon LLP was a Los Angeles–based law firm that specialized in domestic and international intellectual property law matters, with over 100 patent lawyers in six offices in California, New York City, and Washington D.C.

== History ==
The firm was founded in 1901 when Frederick Saxton Lyon began practicing patent law in Los Angeles. The firm acquired its full name in 1919, when Frederick's son, Leonard, became his partner.

In its heyday, Lyon & Lyon LLP was one of the largest, oldest and most pre-eminent intellectual property firms in the nation, and had expertise in patents, trademarks, copyrights and trade secrets, in all principal areas of technology, in prosecution (both domestic and international), in licensing and in litigation. The firm obtained thousands upon thousands of patents, trademark registrations and copyright registrations and compiled an exceptional winning record in both jury and non-jury trials.

== Clients ==
The firm handled a number of large intellectual property portfolios worldwide, and had long-established relationships with intellectual property firms in every part of the world. The firm represented clients ranging from individual inventors to large, multi-national companies.

Among the notable patents written by Lyon & Lyon was Philo T. Farnsworth's patent on electronic television. The firm's clients included Disney, Honda, Gucci, K-Mart, Taco Bell and Mitsubishi.

== Dissolution ==
In 2002, Lyon & Lyon filed for bankruptcy and dissolved.
