= Jean Bazin =

Canadian politician and lawyer (1940–2019)

The Honourable Jean Bazin QC AdE

Senator for De la Durantaye, Quebec
- In office December 29, 1986 – December 8, 1989
- Appointed by: Brian Mulroney
- Preceded by: Louis Giguère
- Succeeded by: Mario Beaulieu

59th President of the Canadian Bar Association
- In office 1987–1988
- Preceded by: Bryan Williams
- Succeeded by: J. Patrick Peacock

Personal details
- Born: January 31, 1940 Quebec City, Quebec, Canada
- Died: December 12, 2019 (aged 79) Montreal, Quebec, Canada
- Party: Progressive Conservative Party of Canada
- Education: Université Laval (BComm, LL.B)
- Profession: Lawyer

Jean Bazin QC AdE (January 31, 1940 – December 12, 2019) was a Canadian lawyer and former senator.

== Early life and education ==
Crest of the Université Laval

Born in Quebec City, Bazin earned a Bachelor of Commerce degree and a Licentiate of Laws from Université Laval in 1964. He was elected president of the Canadian Union of Students for the 1964-65 school year.

While at Laval, Bazin became a close friend of another law student, Brian Mulroney, and was part of Mulroney's close circle of friends, including Bernard Roy, Lucien Bouchard, Michel Cogger, Michael Meighen and Peter White. Mulroney would go on to be Prime Minister of Canada; Bouchard would be Premier of Quebec; and Bazin, Cogger and Meighen would all become senators. While they were students, Roy was apparently the driving force to get them to study hard for their law degrees, as he did not think any of them had a future in politics. He ended up as Mulroney's chief of staff.

== Legal career ==
Bazin was called to the Barreau du Québec in 1965, starting with the law firm of Byers Casgrain. He worked there for twenty-two years until he was called to the Senate.

In 1970-71, Bazin was president of the Association du Jeune Barreau de Montréal (Young Lawyers Bar of Montreal). In that capacity, he was involved in the creation of the Bureau de l’assistance judiciaire du Barreau de Montréal, a forerunner to the provincial Aide juridique (Legal Aid) program. Bazin was also on the executives of the Barreau du Québec et the Barreau de Montréal (1972-1973).

From 1987 to 1988, he was the national president of the Canadian Bar Association.

Bazin was appointed Queen's Counsel in 1984 by the federal government. In 2011, the Barreau awarded him the distinction of Avocat émérite, in recognition of his excellence as a lawyer, his service to the profession, and his long-standing interest in alternative dispute resolution and plain language.

== Political career ==
Bazin was active in the Progressive Conservative Party of Canada, and initially supported Joe Clark. However, after becoming disenchanted with Clark's leadership, he joined in the group which was pushing for Mulroney to replace Clark as party leader. In 1983, Mulroney was elected party leader. The following year, Mulroney led the Progressive Conservatives to a landslide victory in the 1984 general election.

In 1986, the Mulroney government appointed Bazin to the Senate of Canada representing the senatorial division of De la Durantaye, Quebec. He sat as a Progressive Conservative and had the position of Vice-Chair of the Senate Standing Committee on Foreign Affairs.

In 1987, there was a major political scandal when a piece of land in Quebec was sold at inflated price to the Swiss company OC Oerlikon, which needed the land to fulfill a federal defence contract. Concerns arose that information had leaked to speculators from inside the government about the upcoming defence contract. Bazin's firm, Byers Casgrain, was acting for Oerlikon and Bazin was one of the people who alerted the Prime Minister to concerns about the transaction. Mulroney dismissed a junior Cabinet minister and requested that the Royal Canadian Mounted Police investigate the matter. Bazin declined to comment publicly on the matter, citing his duty to respect solicitor–client privilege.

Bazin resigned from the Senate in 1989.

== Career post-politics ==
Bazin worked as counsel with the Canadian branch of Dentons, a multinational law firm. Following his time as senator, Bazin returned to the practice of law with his old firm, Byers Casgrain. When that firm merged with Fraser Milner, Bazin continued as a partner in the new firm, Fraser Milner Casgrain. In turn, Dentons was formed in 2013 when Fraser Milner Casgrain merged with two other large law firms, the Anglo-American SNR Denton and the French Salans. He acts as commercial arbitrator and mediator in a number of fields.

In 2004, there was a serious leadership dispute in the Mohawk community of Kanesatake, triggered by disagreements between the Grand Chief and other chiefs on the Kanesatake council. At one point, the Grand Chief's house burnt down and he left the community. The provincial government of Premier Jean Charest appointed Bazin as mediator, to help resolve the dispute.

Bazin has been on the board of directors of a number of bodies. He was the chair of the Société générale de financement du Québec. He has also been on the boards of the Canadian Unity Council, the Laurentian Bank, and Miranda Technologies Inc. Bazin also has sat on the boards of non-profit organizations, such as the Théâtre de Quat’Sous inc. and the Montreal Symphony Orchestra.

Jean Bazin died at the Maisonneuve-Rosemont Hospital, on December 12, 2019.
