= Elliott Portnoy =

American lawyer

- Born: Morgantown, West Virginia
- Spouse: Estee Portnoy

Elliott I. Portnoy (born November 1, 1965) is an American attorney and the global chief executive officer of Dentons—a law firm that launched March 28, 2013 with the combination of US/UKMEA firm SNR Denton, Canada's Fraser Milner Casgrain and France's Salans.

Portnoy was previously the chief executive of SNR Denton, a combination between Sonnenschein Nath & Rosenthal LLP and Denton Wilde Sapte. At 41, he took over as chairman of Sonnenschein, making him the youngest partner to serve in the role and the first outside Chicago, where that firm was founded in 1906.

== Early life and education ==
Harvard Law School, J.D., cum laude, 1992
Oxford University, Rhodes Scholar, Ph.D., 1986-1989
Syracuse University, B.A., summa cum laude, 1986

== Career ==
=== Sonnenschein Nath & Rosenthal ===
Prior to assuming the Sonnenschein chairmanship, Portnoy was chair of the firm's Public Law & Policy Strategies Group, which he founded in 2002. This public policy practice has received national recognition by Chambers USA: America's Leading Lawyers for Business as one of the nation's leading government relations practices and The National Law Journal magazine ranked the group No. 8 on its annual “Influence 50” list of the nation's highest-grossing lobbying practices for 2009.

=== Dentons ===
In line with Portnoy's business vision, the combination of Dentons and Chinese law firm 大成 was announced in January 2015, which created the world's largest law firm upon completion.

In 2015, there were several major regional expansions for the firm. In April 2015, Dentons US agreed to a merger with Atlanta-based law firm McKenna Long & Aldridge, which was completed in June of that year. In November 2015, Dentons completed its combination with 大成, which created the world's largest law firm upon completion, and also announced combinations with offices in Hungary, Luxembourg, and South Africa during 2015.

In December 2023, Elliott announced his intention to stand down as Global CEO in November 2024.

== Awards and honors ==
In 2009, Portnoy was named the top D.C. lawyer in the category of "Lobbying Law" by the Washington Business Journal. He was also recognized as one of the nation's top lobbyists by Washingtonian magazine, which also credited him for the growth of Sonnenschein's lobbying practice.

He has been selected for the past three years as a prominent government relations specialist by Super Lawyers and as one of Washington's “Legal Elite” by Washington CEO magazine. Lawdragon named him one of its “100 Managing Partners You Need to Know” in 2008. In its 2010 edition, Chambers USA calls him “a tremendously respected attorney.”

Portnoy was recognized by Best Lawyers in America 2022 edition and was named “Lawyer of the Year”, Government Relations Practice.

== Community service ==
In 1988, while studying at Oxford University as a Rhodes Scholar, Portnoy founded the organization Kids Enjoy Exercise Now (KEEN) with his wife, Estee Portnoy, and expanded it to Washington, D.C., in 1992. KEEN is a nonprofit organization that provides sports opportunities to children with severe and profound disabilities. Since 2006, the organization has expanded beyond Washington, D.C. to eight U.S. cities. Portnoy also serves on the board of directors of several non-profit foundations including the MetaCancer Foundation.

In 1999, Washingtonian magazine named him "Washingtonian of the Year" for his work with Kids Enjoy Exercise Now.

In April 2019, Portnoy joined the Board of Directors of Catalyst, a global non-profit working with some of the world's most influential business leaders and companies committed to advancing and progressing women in the workplace.

== Personal life ==
Portnoy is married to Estee Portnoy, an attorney. The couple met as teenagers at a BBYO event in their hometown. Portnoy lives outside of Washington, DC. He has three children.
