= Zachary D. Kaufman =

American legal academic (born 1979)

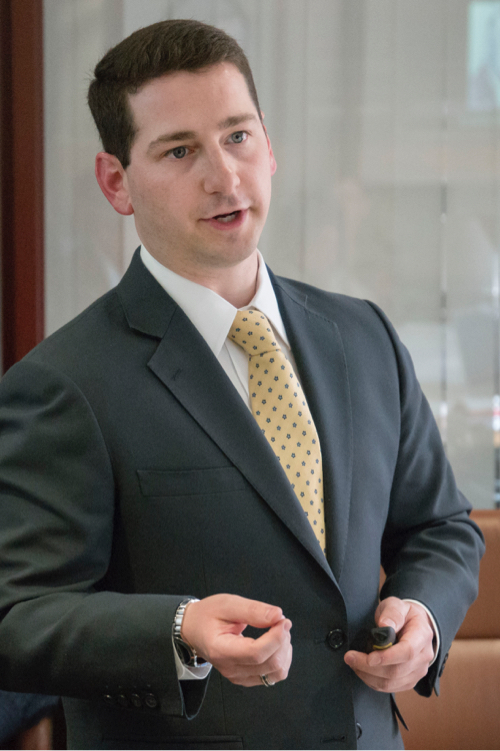
- Born: Zachary Daniel Coleman Kaufman; February 17, 1979 (age 47); Houston, Texas, U.S.
- Education: Yale University (B.A.) University of Oxford (M.Phil., D.Phil. / Ph.D.) Yale Law School (J.D.)
- Height: 4 ft 11 in (150 cm)
- Spouse: Elizabeth Katz (m. 2015)
- Children: 1
- Website: www.zacharykaufman.com (personal)

Zachary Daniel Coleman Kaufman (born February 17, 1979) is a law professor, political scientist, author, and social entrepreneur. He is currently associate professor of Law and Political Science at the University of Florida Levin College of Law, where he teaches Criminal Law, International Law, and International and Transitional Justice. He also holds appointments at the university's Department of Political Science, Hobby School of Public Affairs, and Elizabeth D. Rockwell Center on Ethics and Leadership. Kaufman specializes in criminal law, international law, international and transitional justice, international courts and tribunals, human rights, atrocity crimes (including genocide, war crimes, and crimes against humanity), atrocity prevention and response, legislation (including Bad Samaritan laws), bystanders and upstanders, U.S. foreign policy and national security, the United Nations, social entrepreneurship, and Africa (particularly Rwanda).

== Positions, affiliations, and fellowships ==
=== Current ===
- Since 2021, Kaufman has served on the Yale Law School Executive Committee.
- Since 2020, Kaufman has served on the Marshall Scholarship Regional Selection Committee for Texas, Colorado, New Mexico, Oklahoma, Arkansas, and Louisiana.
- Since 2020, Kaufman has served as co-chair of the American Society of International Law’s Human Rights Interest Group.
- Since 2020, Kaufman has served as an officer of the Association of American Law Schools' International Human Rights Section.
- Since 2016, Kaufman has been a Fellow of the Truman National Security Project.
- Since 2014, Kaufman has served on the executive committee of the Board of Directors of the Association of Marshall Scholars.
- Since 2013, Kaufman has served on the Board of Advisors of Genocide Watch.
- Since 1999, Kaufman has served as a Senior Fellow and member of the American Planning Board of Humanity in Action.

=== Previous ===
- From 2016 to 2019, Kaufman was a Senior Fellow at Harvard University's John F. Kennedy School of Government.
- From 2017 to 2019, Kaufman was a Fellow and Lecturer in Law at Stanford Law School.
- From 2016 to 2017, Kaufman served as a Council on Foreign Relations International Affairs Fellow at the U.S. Senate Foreign Relations Committee.
- From 2015 to 2016, Kaufman served as a Fellow at Harvard University's John F. Kennedy School of Government.
- From 2014 to 2015, Kaufman served as a Fellow at the United States Supreme Court.
- From 2013 to 2018, Kaufman was a Term Member of the Council on Foreign Relations.
- From 2014 to 2016, Kaufman served on the Board of Directors of Indego Africa.
- From 2011 to 2020, Kaufman served on the Board of Advisors of Indego Africa, and was the Board's Chair from 2013 to 2016.
- From 2005 to 2006, Kaufman served as a Fellow at Stanford University, in the Freeman Spogli Institute for International Studies (FSI) Center on Democracy, Development, and the Rule of Law (CDDRL).

== Awards ==
Kaufman has received recognition for his academic and public service work, including:

- being named "A Leader of Our Generation" at Dartmouth College's Tuck School of Business
- being named as one of the “Top 99 Under 33 Foreign Policy Leaders” by Young Professionals in Foreign Policy (YPFP) and The Diplomatic Courier
- receiving the Dr. Louis Rabineau Award “for outstanding leadership” from Humanity in Action

== Education ==
Kaufman is a graduate of Suncrest Middle School, Shady Side Academy, Yale University, the University of Oxford (where he was a Marshall Scholar), and Yale Law School.

In 2000, Kaufman received his Bachelor of Arts (B.A.) degree in political science from Yale University, where he was the student body president, co-captain of the Yale Wrestling Team, and an All-American and Runner-up National Champion in the National Collegiate Wrestling Association.

In 2004, Kaufman received his M.Phil. (Master's) degree in International Relations from the University of Oxford, where he served on the executive committee of the Magdalen College Trust, his residential college's grant-making charity.

In 2009, Kaufman received his Juris Doctor (JD) degree from Yale Law School, where he served as Editor-in-Chief of the Yale Law & Policy Review.

In 2012, Kaufman received his D.Phil. (PhD) degree in International Relations from the University of Oxford.

== Scholarship ==
Kaufman is an author and lecturer.

To date, Kaufman has published three books. He is the author of United States Law and Policy on Transitional Justice: Principles, Politics, and Pragmatics. He is the co-editor (with Dr. Phil Clark) and co-author of After Genocide: Transitional Justice, Post-Conflict Reconstruction, and Reconciliation in Rwanda and Beyond. He is also the editor and co-author of Social Entrepreneurship in the Age of Atrocities: Changing Our World.

Kaufman's research has been published by a variety of scholarly journals, including:

- the Yale Law & Policy Review,
- the Yale Journal of International Law,
- the Yale Human Rights & Development Law Journal,
- the Harvard International Law Journal,
- the Harvard Journal on Legislation,
- the Stanford Law & Policy Review,
- the Boston College Law Review,
- the Southern California Law Review,
- the Emory International Law Review,
- the Journal of International Criminal Justice, and
- others.

Kaufman's commentary has been published by a variety of popular outlets, including:

- the New York Times,
- the Washington Post,
- the Boston Globe,
- the Houston Chronicle,
- the San Francisco Chronicle,
- the New York Daily News,
- Foreign Policy,
- Forbes,
- Just Security,
- Corporate Counsel, and
- others.

Kaufman has delivered speeches and lectures at a variety of institutions around the world, including at law schools, political science departments, public policy schools, and business schools in the United States (e.g., Harvard University, Yale University, Stanford University, Columbia University, New York University, Georgetown University, George Washington University, Dartmouth College, University of Michigan, Johns Hopkins University, United States Naval Academy, American University) and abroad (e.g., University of Oxford, University of Cambridge, London School of Economics and Political Science, King's College London, University of London's School of Oriental and African Studies).

== Founding of the Kigali Public Library ==
Kaufman was instrumental in the founding of the Kigali Public Library (also known as Rwanda Library Services), which is Rwanda’s first public library. The library became operational in April 2012, offering 12,000 books. Kaufman is the founder, president, and chairman of the Board of Directors of the American Friends of the Kigali Public Library and an Honorary Member of the Rotary Club of Kigali-Virunga, Rwanda.

== Representative publications ==
=== Books ===
- Kaufman, Zachary D. United States Law and Policy on Transitional Justice: Principles, Politics, and Pragmatics. Oxford University Press, 2016.
- Kaufman, Zachary D., ed. Social Entrepreneurship in the Age of Atrocities: Changing Our World. Edward Elgar Publishing, Inc., 2012.
- Clark, Phil, and Zachary D. Kaufman, eds. After Genocide: Transitional Justice, Post-Conflict Reconstruction, and Reconciliation in Rwanda and Beyond. Oxford University Press, 2009.

==== Chapters ====
- "Transitional Justice Delayed Is Not Transitional Justice Denied: Contemporary Confrontation of Japanese Human Experimentation During World War II Through a People’s Tribunal." People’s Tribunals, Human Rights, and the Law 163 (Regina Paulose ed., 2020).
- "United Nations International Criminal Tribunal for Rwanda." Encyclopedia of Transitional Justice. Eds. Nadya Nedelsky & Lavinia Stan. (2d ed. forthcoming 2019).
- With Phil Clark. "Rwanda: Recent History." Africa South of the Sahara 2016. Ed. Iain Frame. London, UK: Routledge, 2015. 969-77
- With Phil Clark. "Rwanda: Recent History." Africa South of the Sahara 2015. Ed. Iain Frame. London, UK: Routledge, 2014. 971–79.
- "Transitional Justice as Genocide Prevention: From a Culture of Impunity to a Culture of Accountability." Confronting Genocide in Rwanda: Dehumanization, Denial, and Strategies for Prevention. Eds. Jean-Damascene Gasanabo, David J. Simon & Margee M. Ensign. Kigali, Rwanda: The National Commission for the Fight Against Genocide, 2014. 363–84.
- With Phil Clark. "Rwanda: Recent History." Africa South of the Sahara 2014. Ed. Iain Frame. London, UK: Routledge, 2013. 980–88.
- International Criminal Tribunal for Rwanda." Encyclopedia of Transitional Justice. Eds. Lavinia Stan and Nadya Nedelsky. New York, NY: Cambridge University Press, 2012. 233–37.
- "With Phil Clark. "Rwanda: Recent History." Africa South of the Sahara 2013. Ed. Iain Frame. London, UK: Routledge, 2012. 984–92.
- "Social Entrepreneurship in the Age of Atrocities: Introduction." Social Entrepreneurship in the Age of Atrocities: Changing Our World. Ed. Zachary D. Kaufman. Edward Elgar Publishing, Inc., 2012. 1–19.
- "Social Entrepreneurship in a Post-Genocide Society: Building Rwanda's First Public Library, the Kigali Public Library." Social Entrepreneurship in the Age of Atrocities: Changing Our World. Ed. Zachary D. Kaufman. Edward Elgar Publishing, Inc., 2012. 58–82.
- "Social Entrepreneurship in the Age of Atrocities: Lessons Learned and Conclusion." Social Entrepreneurship in the Age of Atrocities: Changing Our World. Ed. Zachary D. Kaufman. Edward Elgar Publishing, Inc., 2012. 189–221.
- "Appendix: Social Entrepreneurship Resources and Institutions." Social Entrepreneurship in the Age of Atrocities: Changing Our World. Ed. Zachary D. Kaufman. Edward Elgar Publishing, Inc., 2012. 225–45.
- With Phil Clark. "Rwanda: Recent History." Africa South of the Sahara 2012. Ed. Iain Frame. London, UK: Routledge, 2011. 993–1001.
- With Phil Clark. "Rwanda: Recent History." Africa South of the Sahara 2011. Ed. Iain Frame. London, UK: Routledge, 2010. 977–85.
- With Phil Clark. "Rwanda: Recent History." Africa South of the Sahara 2010. Ed. Iain Frame. London, UK: Routledge, 2009. 968–76.
- With Phil Clark. "Rwanda: Recent History." Africa South of the Sahara 2009. Ed. Iain Frame. London, UK: Routledge, 2008. 924–31.
- With Phil Clark. "After Genocide." After Genocide: Transitional Justice, Post-Conflict Reconstruction, and Reconciliation in Rwanda and Beyond. Eds. Phil Clark and Zachary D. Kaufman. Oxford University Press, 2016. 1–19.
- "The United States Role in the Establishment of the United Nations International Criminal Tribunal for Rwanda." After Genocide: Transitional Justice, Post-Conflict Reconstruction, and Reconciliation in Rwanda and Beyond. Eds. Phil Clark and Zachary D. Kaufman. Oxford University Press, 2016. 229–60.
- With Phil Clark and Kalypso Nicolaidis. "Tensions in Transitional Justice." After Genocide: Transitional Justice, Post-Conflict Reconstruction, and Reconciliation in Rwanda and Beyond. Eds. Phil Clark and Zachary D. Kaufman. Oxford University Press, 2016. 381–91.
- With Phil Clark. "Rwanda: Recent History." Africa South of the Sahara 2008. Ed. Iain Frame. London, UK: Routledge, 2007. 927–34.
- "Sudan, the United States, and the International Criminal Court: A Tense Triumvirate in Transitional Justice for Darfur." The Criminal Law of Genocide: International, Comparative, and Contextual Aspects. Eds. Ralph Henham and Paul Behrens. Aldershot, UK: Ashgate, 2007. 49–60.
- With Phil Clark. "Rwanda: Recent History." Africa South of the Sahara 2007. Ed. Iain Frame. London, UK: Routledge, 2006. 935–42.
- With Pierre-Richard St. Hilaire. "The Rwandan Experience." Rwanda and South Africa in Dialogue: Addressing the Legacies of Genocide and a Crime Against Humanity. Eds. Charles Villa-Vicencio and Tyrone Savage. Institute of Justice and Reconciliation, 2001. 41–45.

==== Reviews ====
- Review of The Pinochet Effect: Transnational Justice in the Age of Human Rights, by Naomi Roht-Arriaza. Yale Journal of International Law. Vol. 32, Issue 1 (Winter 2007): 297–300.
- Review of Designing Criminal Tribunals: Sovereignty and International Concerns in the Protection of Human Rights, by Steven D. Roper and Lilian A. Barria. Yale Human Rights and Development Law Journal. Volume 10 (2006–07): 209–14.

=== Journal articles ===
==== Academic ====
- "Digital Age Samaritans." Boston College Law Review. Volume 62 (2021). 1117–1192.
- "Legislating Atrocity Prevention." Harvard Journal on Legislation. Volume 57 (2020). 163–218.
- "Protectors of Predators or Prey: Bystanders and Upstanders Amid Sexual Crimes." Southern California Law Review. Volume 92 (2019). 1317–1406.
- "Lessons from Rwanda: Post-Genocide Law and Policy." Stanford Law & Policy Review Online, 2019.
- "The Prospects, Problems, and Proliferation of Recent UN Investigations of International Law Violations." Journal of International Criminal Justice. Volume 16, Issue 1 (2018). 93–112.
- "From the Aztecs to the Kalahari Bushmen - Conservative Justices' Citation of Foreign Sources: Consistency, Inconsistency, or Evolution?" Yale Journal of International Law Online. Volume 41 (2015). 1–8.
- "Transitional Justice for Tojo's Japan: The United States Role in the Establishment of the International Military Tribunal for the Far East and Other Transitional Justice Mechanisms for Japan After World War II." Emory International Law Review. Volume 27, Issue 2 (2013). 755–98.
- "The United States, Syria, and the International Criminal Court: Implications of the Rome Statute’s Aggression Amendment." Harvard International Law Journal Online. Volume 55 (2013). 1–14.
- "Comment" (on "Managing the Rule of Law in the Americas"). Inter-American Law Review. Volume 42, Issue 3 (Spring 2011). 253–60.
- "The Nuremberg Tribunal v. The Tokyo Tribunal: Designs, Staffs, and Operations." John Marshall Law Review. Volume 43, Issue 3 (Fall 2010). 753–68.
- "Transitional Justice Delayed is not Transitional Justice Denied: Contemporary Confrontation of Japanese Human Experimentation During World War II Through a People's Tribunal." Yale Law & Policy Review. Vol. 26, Issue 2 (Spring 2008). 645–59.
- "No Right to Fight: The Modern Implications of Japan's Pacifist Postwar Constitution." Yale Journal of International Law. Vol. 33, Issue 1 (Winter 2008). 266–73.
- "Justice in Jeopardy: Accountability for the Darfur Atrocities." Criminal Law Forum. Volume 16, Issue 4 (April 2006): 343–60.
- "The Future of Transitional Justice." St. Antony’s International Review. Volume 1, Number 1 (March 2005): 58–81.

==== Practitioner ====
- "Making Social and Environmental Impact Through Legal Careers: The Top 10 Roles for Attorneys in Social Entrepreneurship." Law For Change. August 2013. 1–16.
- With Theodore W. Kassinger and Heather L. Traeger. "Democratizing Entrepreneurship: An Overview of the Past, Present, and Future of Crowdfunding." Bloomberg BNA Securities Regulation and Law Report. Volume 45, Number 5 (February 2013). 208–17.
- "Youth and Social Entrepreneurship." Diplomatic Courier. Volume 7, Issue 1 (January / February 2013). 68–69.
- With K. Lee Blalack and David J. Leviss. "Preparing for Aggressive Congressional Investigations in 2013." Corporate Counsel. 6 June 2012.

=== Opinion pieces ===
- Prod Bystanders to be 'Upstanders' like Darnella Frazier, Houston Chronicle (May 6, 2021).
- What Makes People Save Lives? Learning from Upstanders and Bystanders, New York Daily News (Oct. 27, 2020).
- No Cover for Abusers; California Must Close Gap in its Duty-to-Report Law, San Francisco Chronicle (June 23, 2019), at A15.
- When Sexual Abuse is Common Knowledge – But Nobody Speaks Up, Boston Globe (Aug. 3, 2018).
- Jesner v. Arab Bank: U.S. Foreign Policy and National Security Interests, Just Security (Oct. 11, 2017).
- Give the Nobel Peace Prize Posthumously, Foreign Pol’y. (Oct. 5, 2017).
- New UN Team Investigating ISIS Atrocities Raises Questions about Justice in Iraq and Beyond, Just Security (Sept. 28, 2017).
- Islam is (Also) a Religion of Peace, Foreign Pol’y (Aug. 4, 2016).
- Transitions in Transitional Justice, Oxford University Press Blog (July 17, 2016).
- Term Limits at Home and Abroad, Harvard University Kennedy School of Government Blog (June 30, 2016).
- It’ll Take More Than Political Rhetoric to Stop Genocide, Forbes (May 10, 2016).
- Addressing Japanese Atrocities, Oxford University Press Blog (Apr. 11, 2016).
- Social Entrepreneurship, Council on Foreign Relations Blog (Nov. 30, 2012).
