= DeHeng Law Offices =

Chinese law firm

- Headquarters: Beijing, China
- No. of offices: 31
- No. of lawyers: 2,446 (2017)
- Date founded: 1993
- Website: DeHeng Law Offices

DeHeng Law Offices is a Beijing-based Chinese law firm ranked the third largest among domestic firms by number of lawyers. The firm is a private partnership but traces its origins as an offshoot of the China Law Office, a state-owned law office established in 1993.

== History ==
The firm traces back to January 1993 when the Ministry of Justice launched the China Law Office. Big changes had been brewing in the country's legal service market when the firm was founded. Until 1992, all law firms had been state owned.

=== Naming dispute ===
A branch in Qingdao was opened in December 1993 called China Law Office Qingdao DeHeng Law Firm. The branch parted ways with China Law Office in 1995 and went by the name Deheng Law Firm. The Beijing-based head office also changed its name in 1995, becoming DeHeng Law Offices. The similar names caused confusion and led to a long running dispute. While the former Qingdao branch on separating changed one of the Chinese characters in its former parent's name to distinguish itself, the pinyin transliteration of the changed character is still "heng". The resulting name was different when written in Chinese characters but still identical when rendered in pinyin and sounding similar in spoken Chinese to the name of DeHeng Law Offices. As of 2017 the former Qingdao branch brands itself as Beijing DHH Law Firm rather than Deheng Law Firm.

=== Trial of the century ===
Criminal defense lawyers of DeHeng played a key role in the 2013 trial of Bo Xilai, a former paramount leader within the Communist Party, who was tried for bribery, embezzlement and abuse of power in what was dubbed the trial of the century. DeHeng served as defense counsel with Li Guifang, a partner of the firm, appointed as chief defense attorney. The Wall Street Journal described DeHeng's role as acting as an "intermediary" that facilitated between Mr. Bo, his relatives and prosecutors the negotiation of "an outcome acceptable to all sides in the run-up to the trial—and to help ensure that the trial itself goes according to plan".

=== Global growth ===
The firm has considered a "tie-up" with an international law firm. David Chen, a managing partner of the firm and head of cross border transactions, in an interview with legal trade publication Legal Week in February 2015, suggested the firm was considering options for a merger to support outbound investments and mergers. The Chinese legal market had at the time witnessed two mergers between domestic firms and foreign firms with the merger of King & Wood and Mallesons Stephen Jaques to form King & Wood Mallesons in 2012 and the combination of Dacheng Law Offices and Dentons in early 2015.

== Practice areas ==
DeHeng is primarily a corporate law firm advising in capital markets, corporate/M&A, and banking & finance, three corporate practice areas where it receives recognition from Chambers Asia-Pacific 2018, a legal directory ranking law firms by practice areas in jurisdictions. The firm is described in its entry in Chambers Asia-Pacific 2018 for Corporate/M&A as having "a distinguished track record in outbound transactions" particularly in the sectors of tech and mining. In capital markets, DeHeng acted for Agricultural Bank of China in its $22.1 billion IPO in 2010, which was then the largest IPO in history.

The full list of practice areas listed on its website are corporate & securities, financing & insurance, merger & acquisition, venture capital & private equity, international trade, foreign direct investment, construction & real estate, dispute resolution, labor & social security, intellectual property law, taxation, and bankruptcy & restructuring.

== Awards and recognition ==
DeHeng Law Offices, a prominent law firm based in China, has garnered significant accolades for its legal expertise and accomplishments in recent years.

- China Business Law Journal Rankings:
  - In 2022, DeHeng was recognized as one of the top legal advisers for the A-share market by China Business Law Journal.
  - The firm secured eight positions in the 2022 China Business Law Awards (Regional Awards).
  - Several of DeHeng's deals were featured in the Deals of the Year 2022 by China Business Law Journal.
- IFLR1000 2023:
  - DeHeng had 15 lawyers and eight practice areas ranked in the IFLR1000 2023 list, highlighting its strong presence in various legal fields.
- Chambers Global Guide 2022:
  - The firm had nine lawyers and six practice areas named in the Chambers Global Guide 2022, reflecting its global reach and expertise.
- Chambers Greater China Region Guide 2023:
  - In the Chambers Greater China Region Guide 2023, DeHeng was recognized with 28 lawyers and 17 practice areas.
- Legal 500 Asia Pacific 2023:
  - DeHeng had 58 lawyers and 21 practice areas recommended in the 2023 Legal 500 Asia Pacific Guide.
- LEGALBAND 2023:
  - The firm was ranked as a Top Law Firm in 19 areas and secured 22 positions in the Top Ranked Lawyers 2023 by LEGALBAND.
  - DeHeng was also awarded the China Law Awards 2023 by LEGALBAND.

== Offices ==
There are 27 domestic offices including the head office in Beijing and four international offices.

- Domestic (27): Beijing, Shenzhen, Guangzhou, Shanghai, Hangzhou, Zhuhai, Suzhou, Tianjin, Wuhan, Changsha, Jinan, Shenyang, Dalian, Changchun, Xi'an, Chongqing, Zhengzhou, Fuzhou, Urumqi, Nanjing, Taiyuan, Hefei, Chengdu, Kunming, Dongguan, Wenzhou, and Wuxi
- Overseas (5): (Kazakhstan) Nur-Sultan, (France) Paris, (Belgium) Brussels, (United Arab Emirates) Dubai, and (United States) New York City

== See also ==
- List of largest Chinese law firms
