= Dentons =

American law firm

- Headquarters: Decentralised, largest offices in London and New York
- No. of offices: 160
- No. of lawyers: 5,600+
- Key people: Kate Barton (CEO); Nicholas Howon Park (chairman)
- Revenue: ▲$2.899 billion (2019)
- Profit per equity partner: $1.07 million (2018)
- Date founded: Year 1788 (Establishment of City of London law firm Denton Hall by Samuel Denton); 28 March 2013 (Creation of modern Dentons by the three-way merger of SNR Denton, Salans and Fraser Milner Casgrain)
- Company type: Swiss Verein
- Website: dentons.com

Dentons is a multinational law firm based in the United States. It was founded in March 2013 by the merger of SNR Denton, Fraser Milner Casgrain and Salans. The Dentons name originally belonged to Denton Hall, a law firm based in the City of London founded by Samuel Denton in 1788 that merged with fellow City of London firm Wilde Sapte in 2000 to form Denton Wilde Sapte, which subsequently merged with Chicago-based Sonnenschein Nath & Rosenthal to form SNR Denton in 2010. As of November 2024, the London office remains Dentons' largest office by number of lawyers, with the New York office following behind in second place.

As of April 2023, Dentons operated in 80+ countries and had 160+ offices. The firm has no headquarters, although the firm's senior leadership are primarily based in London, New York and Washington, D.C. Dentons is structured as a Swiss verein called the Dentons Group, which does not itself provide legal services. The Swiss verein structure encapsulates multiple cooperating legal entities, namely Dentons Canada LLP, Dentons Europe LLP, Dentons UK and Middle East LLP, and Dentons US LLP, amongst others.

== History ==
In 1785, Thomas Wilde (1758–1821) and Samuel Archer Hussey founded a law firm that became Wilde Sapte. In 1788, Denton Hall Burgin was established by Sam Denton. In 1906, Edward Sonnenschein and partners opened a law firm in Chicago that eventually became Sonnenschein Nath Rosenthal. In 1978, Salans Hertzfeld & Heilbronn was founded by two American lawyers, Carl Salans and Jeffrey Herzfeld, and a French lawyer, Eliane Heilbronn. In 1991, it became the first Western law firm to enter Russia.

In October 1997 Salans Hertzfeld & Heilbronn acquired the London-based law firm Harris Rosenblatt & Kramerhas, becoming the first Continental law firm to practice UK law. In September 1998 Salans Hertzfeld & Heilbronn and the New York-based law firm Christy & Viener agreed to merge. The merger was completed on 1 January 1999. Also in September 1998 Salans Hertzfeld & Heilbronn acquired the Paris-based IT boutique law firm FG Associes. In September 2003 Salans Hertzfeld & Heilbronn, renamed Salans, acquired the Prague, Bucharest, Bratislava, Istanbul and Shanghai offices of the collapsed American law firm Altheimer & Gray's. In January 2006 Salans opened its first office in Germany through the acquisition of the Berlin office of the collapsed German law firm Haarmann Hemmelrath. Salans acquired the Spanish law firm Masons Buxeda Menchén in April 2007, giving it offices in Madrid and Barcelona.

In 2000, the City of London-based law firms Denton Hall and Wilde Sapte merged to form Denton Wilde Sapte. In 2009, 100 lawyers (including 40 partners) joined Sonnenschein from Thacher Proffitt & Wood, doubling the firm's number of lawyers in New York. In May 2010, Denton Wilde Sapte and Sonnenschein Nath & Rosenthal announced their intention to merge. On 30 September 2010, the merger between Denton Wilde Sapte and Sonnenschein Nath & Rosenthal was formally completed, establishing SNR Denton.

On 11 November 2012, SNR Denton, Salans, and the Canada-based Fraser Milner Casgrain announced a three-way merger, forming a new law firm structured as a Swiss Verein and named Dentons. The partners of the three firms ratified the merger on 28 November 2012 and the new firm began operations on 28 March 2013.

In June 2025, Dentons announced a strategic partnership to develop new legal tools with Canadian AI company AXL, co-founded by its CEO, University of Toronto computer science professor Daniel Wigdor.

== Corporate leadership ==
In March 2023, Joseph Andrew stepped down as the Global Chairman of Dentons, which was a position he held since the three-way merger of SNR Denton, Fraser Milner Casgrain and Salans in 2010.

In August 2023, Nicholas Howon Park of Dentons Lee was elected as Non-Executive Chair of the Global Board of Dentons.

In December 2023, Elliott Portnoy, the Global Chief Executive Officer since the three-way merger combination in 2013, announced his intention to stand down as Global CEO. He officially stepped down in November 2024. Kate Barton, who joined the firm as Global CEO-Elect in September 2024, assumed the role of Global Chief Executive Officer in November 2024.

== Acquisitions and mergers ==
On January 26, 2015, Dentons announced that it was combining with a Chinese firm, Dacheng (Chinese: 大成) which was completed in November 2015. The new firm was called 大成 (Dacheng) in Chinese and "Dentons" in other languages, with a logo featuring the Chinese and English names combined as "大成 Dentons." Following the combination, Dentons surpassed Baker & McKenzie and DLA Piper, two of the world's previously largest law firms by headcount, by at least 2,500 lawyers.

In April 2015, Dentons US agreed to a merger with Atlanta-based law firm McKenna Long & Aldridge which was completed in June of that year. The firm also opened new offices in Hungary, Luxembourg and South Africa during 2015 and announced combinations with firms in Australia, Colombia, and Mexico. It also launched Nextlaw Labs, a business accelerator focused on new technologies, in May 2015. Dentons also announced in November 2016 that it would become the first global law firm with a footprint in Central America by combining with Muñoz Global, adding offices in Panama, Nicaragua and Costa Rica operating as Dentons Muñoz was created as the Costa Rican and Central American chapter of Dentons.

In April 2016, Dentons launched in Singapore by combining with the oldest and one of the most prestigious law firms in Singapore, Rodyk & Davidson. In December 2016, Dentons launched in Australia and Papua New Guinea by combining with leading Australian law firm Gadens. The Sydney, Perth and Port Moresby offices of Gadens joined Dentons, while the Adelaide and Brisbane offices became "associate offices" and the Melbourne office remained independent. The Gadens combination resulted in Dentons having approximately 7,600 lawyers serving 57 countries.

In 2017, Dentons merged with Scottish firm Maclay Murray & Spens.

As of April 12 of 2018, Dentons announced partnerships in Kenya, Mauritius, Caribbean, Indonesia and Malaysia.

In 2019, Dentons announced the launch of Dentons Lee in Seoul, becoming the first international law firm to incorporate a Korean legal practice.

In 2021, Dentons combined with a Nigeria-based law firm, ACAS Law.

In 2022, Dentons combined with Zaanouni Law Firm & Associates in Tunisia and LuatViet in Vietnam. In October 2022, the firm announced a combination with Indian law firm Link Legal.

In March 2023, Dentons announced its intention to combine with Philippines-based PJS Law. In February 2024, the combination with PJS Law was officially launched. In May 2023, Dentons launched its combination with Indian law firm Link Legal, making it the first global law firm to combine with a law firm in India.

In August 2023, Dentons ended its combination with Dacheng, and established a "preferred firm" relationship, with Dacheng now operating independently as Beijing Dacheng Law Offices (大成). Dentons continued to hold its position as the largest law firm in the world, even following the conclusion of its combination with Dacheng. Dentons' Hong Kong practice is unaffected by the split and remains part of Dentons. The firm name Dentons is officially translated into Chinese as “德同”。

In October 2024, Dentons announced that it would launch offerings with four firms across Africa: Tamrat Assefa Liban Law Office in Ethiopia, LEGALIX in Senegal, Kouengoua Minou Nkongho (KMN) in Cameroon, and Pathy Liongo & Associates in the Democratic Republic of Congo.

=== 3D Global Affairs ===
In 2017 the firm formed a strategic alliance with Republican opposition research firm Definers Public Affairs, dubbed 3D Global Affairs. In 2018, Dentons disavowed involvement with Definers Public Affairs's opposition research work for Facebook.

=== DGA Group ===
On June 2, 2021, Denton announced the launch of Dentons Global Advisors, composed of founding acquisition Albright Stonebridge Group along with a team of advisory industry leaders, including Ed Reilly, who is chief executive officer (CEO). DGA Group competes with McKinsey, BCG, and other conglomerate consultancies.

On July 27, 2021, Interel, a pan-European public affairs consultancy, was acquired by Dentons Global Advisors, renamed as Dentons Global Advisors Interel. In June 2024, Dentons Global Advisors rebranded to DGA Group.

== Notable lawyers ==
- Nicholas Allard, Dean and President of Brooklyn Law School
- Joseph Andrew, former Global Chair of Dentons and former Chair of the Democratic National Committee
- Ashley Bell, former advisor in the White House Office of American Innovation; partner in Dentons' policy practice
- Jeff Bleich, former U.S. Ambassador to Australia
- Jean Chretien, former Prime Minister of Canada
- George W. Darden, former Member U.S. House of Representatives; presidential appointee to the Board of the Overseas Private Investment Corporation; Advisor on behalf of the National Democratic Institute for International Affairs
- Philip Jeyaretnam SC, Judge of the Supreme Court of Singapore
- Stefan Passantino, attorney, former member Office of White House Counsel
- Elliott Portnoy, attorney, former Global CEO of Dentons
- David Syed, Head of Sovereign Practice
- Scott Turow, author and lawyer
- Joseph Crowley, Former U.S. Congressmen (NY-14)
