= Aicha Mane =

Senegalese lawyer and entrepreneur

- Born: 1984 (age 41–42); Senegal
- Citizenship: Senegal
- Education: American University (Bachelor of Laws); Paris Nanterre University (Master of Laws); Shanghai Jiao Tong University (Master of Business Administration)
- Occupations: Lawyer, entrepreneur and corporate executive
- Known for: Entrepreneurship
- Title: Chief operating officer at The Collective Restaurant and Art Gallery, Nairobi, Kenya

Aicha Mane (born 1984) is a Senegalese lawyer, entrepreneur and corporate executive. She is the chief operating officer of The Collective Restaurant and Art Gallery, in the central business district of Nairobi, the capital and largest city in Kenya, an enterprise that she owns and co-founded.

== Background and education ==
Mane was born in Senegal, West Africa, but migrated to the United States when she was 12 years old. She holds a Bachelor of Laws degree, obtained from American University, in Washington, DC, in 2009. Her Master of Laws degree was obtained from Paris Nanterre University, in Paris, France. She also holds a Master of Business Administration, awarded by Shanghai Jiao Tong University, in Shanghai, China. She is a member of the New York Bar.

== Career ==
In 2010 and 2011, Mane interned at Salans and at Hafez Avocats in Paris. She then returned to Senegal and became an independent investment consultant based in Dakar, Senegal, for nearly two and a half years.

In 2014 Mane relocated to Nairobi, Kenya and worked for several investment firms, including Amana Capital and Lordship Africa. She then served as the Director of Operations at Harbour Capital Limited Kenya for two years, from 2015 until 2017. In August 2017 she founded Ayana Capital, an independent consulting firm, based in Nairobi.

== The Collective ==
According to Mane, her attempt at private law practice was not successful. She closed her law practice and concentrated on exploring her culinary curiosity. Beginning in October 2017, the founders of The Collective began to exchange ideas, culminating in the opening of the business in early 2019. The establishment is a combination restaurant, bar and art gallery.
