= David Syed =

French lawyer

- Born: Karachi, Pakistan
- Education: University of Reims Champagne-Ardenne, University of Exeter
- Occupation: Lawyer
- Employer: Dentons

David Syed is a French lawyer of Irish nationality currently serving as head of the Sovereign Advisory Practice of international law firm Dentons Europe.

== Early life and education ==
Syed was born in Karachi, Pakistan to an Irish mother and a Pakistani father. The family first emigrated to Canada and then Venezuela where he undertook schooling before moving to Monte Dourado, Brazil prior to attending boarding school in the United States and Ireland.

In 1984, Syed received a Bachelor of Laws (LLB) from the University of Reims Champagne-Ardenne and in 1987 received a Master of Laws (LLM) from the University of Exeter. He became a member of the Paris Bar in 1991.

== Career ==
Syed began his professional career in 1986, working as in-house counsel with French automotive company Renault from 1986 until 1990.

From 1992 to 2002, Syed served as a Partner of international law firm Watson Farley & Williams, where he successfully developed cross-border financing for private companies and administrative entities such as French state-owned public transport operator RATP and national state-owned railway company SNCF as the founder of the firm's Paris office. In 2002, Syed negotiated the merger of Watson Farley & Williams’ Paris office with the Californian firm Orrick Herrington & Sutcliffe and in 2005, negotiated the firm's merger with French M&A and corporate law figure Jean-Pierre Martel.

In 2017, Syed joined international law firm Dentons Europe to serve as head of the Sovereign Practice. While at Dentons, Syed has served as counsel to the Bolivarian Republic of Venezuela and the Ministry of Economy and Finance in support of the country's debt restructuring and global reintegration efforts.

Syed is an advocate of Latin American economic integration. Writing in The Law Society Gazette, in 2023 Syed called on the Union of South American Nations (UNASUR) and The Community of Latin American and Caribbean States (CELAC) to leverage the region's civil law tradition to create a unified legal and economic space for enhanced global commerce, regional political stability and economic growth.

== Awards and honours ==
In 2010, Syed was appointed Chevalier (Knight) de la Légion d'Honneur by the French Ministry for Foreign and European Affairs under President Nicolas Sarkozy and in 2018, was inducted as an Officer of the Malagasy National Order.

== Personal life ==
Since 2017, Syed has served as a member of the Board of Advisors of Indego Africa, an NGO that supports women in Africa through economic empowerment and education. Syed has also served as a director and Chairman of Positive Planet UK, an NGO focused on developing sustainable economic, social and environmental global inclusion.

Since 2010, Syed has been a member of the UK Board of Trustees for the cultural event Festival d’Aix en Provence.
