= List of law firms of China =

This is a list of the largest China-based law firms by revenue in 2025, based on The China 45 revenue ranking.

Rank	Firm	Lawyers	Revenue
1	Yingke Law Firm	19,292	$1,490,087,000
2	King & Wood Mallesons	2,940	$1,345,064,000
3	Dacheng Law Offices	9,279	$973,913,000
4	AllBright Law Offices	4,275	$655,861,000
5	Zhong Lun Law Firm	1,683	$555,826,000
6	Grandall Law Firm	3,984	$514,382,000
7	DeHeng Law Offices	5,105	$486,147,000
8	Tahota Law Firm	4,340	$338,365,000
9	Jun He Law Offices	781	$326,033,000
10	W&H Law Firm	5,398	$324,895,000
11	Fangda Partners	800	$301,357,000
12	Jingsh Law Firm	6,781	$297,658,000
13	China Commercial Law Firm	4,473	$278,261,000
14	Han Kun Law Offices	805	$254,609,000
15	Beijing DHH Law Firm	4,119	$252,928,000
16	Jingtian & Gongcheng	1,080	$246,579,000
17	Hui Ye Law Firm	2,852	$233,739,000
18	Zhong Yin Law Firm	3,280	$216,193,000
19	Zhong Wen Law Firm	2,606	$210,000,000
20	JT&N	1,428	$205,357,000
21	Guantao Law Firm	2,075	$190,609,000
22	Beijing Kangda Law Firm	2,302	$179,288,000
23	Tian Yuan Law Firm	979	$169,138,000
24	JunZeJun Law Offices	1,297	$135,537,000
25	Zhong Lun W&D Law Firm	2,678	$128,000,000
26	T&C Law Firm	521	$125,217,000
27	Duan & Duan	1,697	$111,657,000
28	Long An Law Firm	2,316	$103,241,000
29	Commerce & Finance Law Offices	764	$99,512,000
30	Global Law Office	479	$94,210,000
31	Jointide Law Firm	944	$84,484,000
32	V&T Law Firm	844	$80,696,000
33	Hylands Law Firm	1,889	$70,810,000
34	Links Law Offices	225	$63,979,000
35	Haiwen & Partners	470	$62,722,000
36	East & Concord Partners	635	$61,372,000
37	Guanghe	1,819	$60,338,000
38	Grandway Law Offices	405	$58,548,000
39	Jia Yuan Law Offices	505	$51,971,000
40	FenXun Partners	73	$51,490,000
41	Gaopeng & Partners	479	$45,439,000
42	Anli Partners	827	$42,435,000
43	Shanghai Co-effort Law Firm	957	$36,362,000
44	TianTong Law Firm	64	$35,533,000
45	Wintell & Co.	433	$32,242,000

== See also ==
- List of largest law firms by revenue
- List of largest United States-based law firms by profits per partner
- List of largest United Kingdom-based law firms by revenue
- List of largest Canada-based law firms by revenue
- List of largest Europe-based law firms by revenue
- List of law firms of Japan
