= Fabrice Guerrier =

Haitian American writer (born 1991)

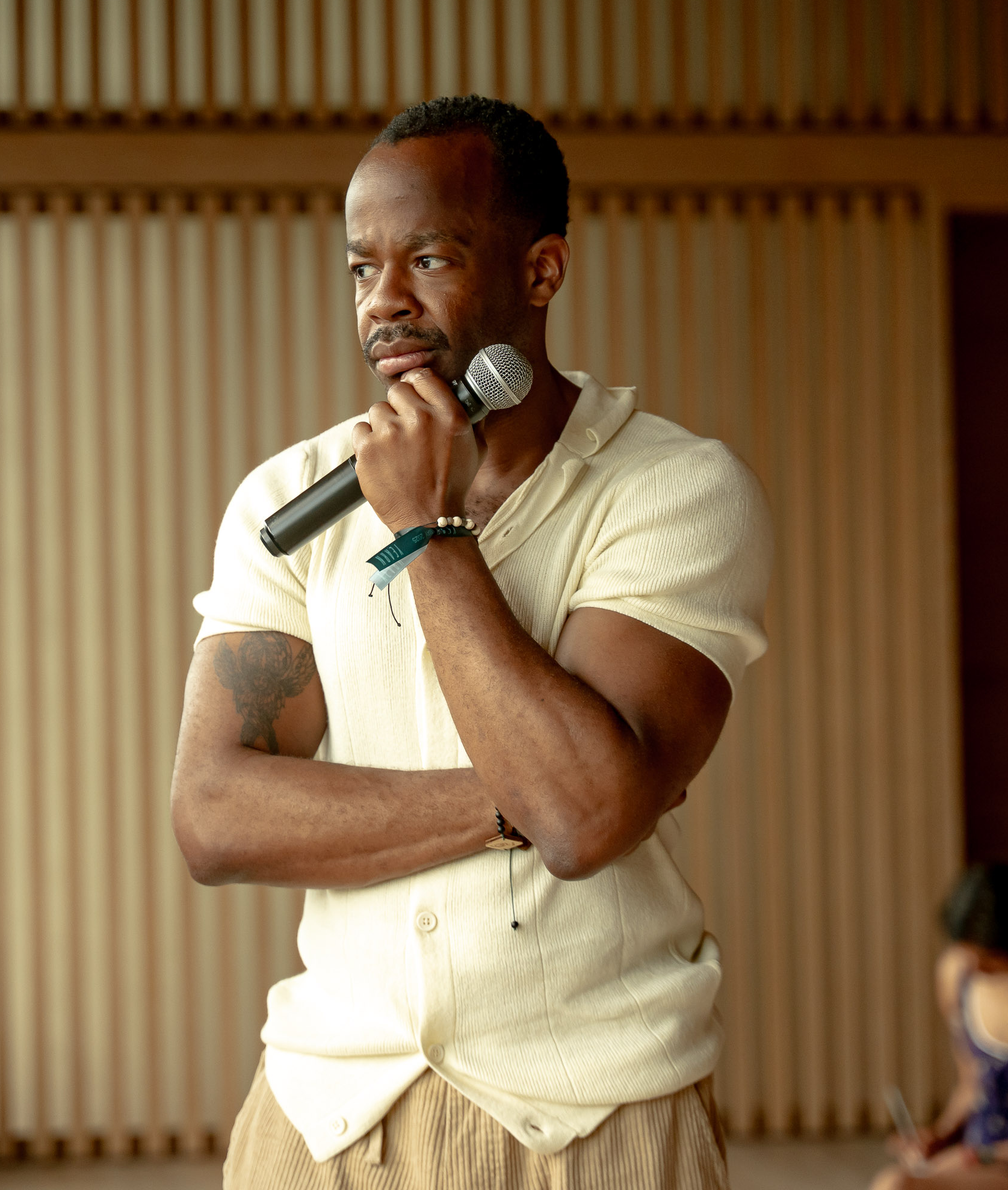
- Guerrier in 2025
- Born: November 14, 1991 (age 34); Port-au-Prince, Haiti
- Education: Florida State University (BA); Eastern Mennonite University (MA)
- Website: fabriceguerrier.com

Fabrice Guerrier (born November 14, 1991) is a Haitian-American fine artist, writer, and futurist whose practice centers on painting, narrative worldbuilding, and speculative fiction as instruments of cultural transformation. Working across acrylic and oil pastel painting, literary fiction, poetry, and what he terms "collaborative worldbuilding"—the structured co-creation of shared fictional universes by writers from underrepresented communities—Guerrier approaches each medium not as a separate discipline but as a surface for the same underlying inquiry: how imagination functions as a social and political force. He is the founder and former chief executive of Syllble Studios (active from 2018 to 2026), widely regarded as the first production house dedicated to collaborative worldbuilding as a formal practice, and has been recognized for developing the field as an interdisciplinary framework at the intersection of speculative fiction, conflict transformation, futures studies, and the visual arts.

== Early life ==
Guerrier was born in Port-au-Prince, Haiti, in 1991. At the age of thirteen, in 2004, he emigrated with his family to Coral Springs, Florida, during the period of the 2004 Haitian coup d'état. Arriving already fluent in French and Haitian Creole, he acquired English as his third language. Guerrier has described the experience of immigration as a formative encounter with cultural dislocation: the more he attempted to assimilate, the more he felt he was eroding a core part of his identity.

He found an early refuge in the Northwest Regional Library, where he worked as a page and a volunteer, engaging with a wide range of materials from manga and comics to encyclopedias, nonfiction, and science fiction. He has credited this period of reading as the seed of what would eventually become Syllble, and has pointed to Jorge Luis Borges' essay "Blindness," from Seven Nights, as a decisive influence on his decision to become a writer—drawn in particular to Borges' description of the library as the closest approximation of heaven.

== Education ==
Guerrier graduated from Florida State University (FSU) with a Bachelor of Science in International Affairs and a certificate in Leadership Studies. While at FSU, he founded the LEEHG Institute, a student-run think tank, and became a member of the Theta Chi fraternity. His leadership work at FSU was included as a case study in James M. Kouzes and Barry Z. Posner's The Student Leadership Challenge: Five Practices for Becoming an Exemplary Leader (2014).

He subsequently earned a Master of Arts in Conflict Transformation from Eastern Mennonite University's (EMU) Center for Justice and Peacebuilding (CJP). His graduate work included field research on Fambul Tok International's reconciliation programs in post-civil-war Sierra Leone and study in the Strategies for Trauma Awareness and Healing (STAR) framework. At CJP, he founded a local chapter of Coming to the Table (CTTT), a racial healing and reconciliation organization founded by descendants of the enslaved and enslavers from the same plantation in the United States. He has described EMU as a place of healing and identified the intertwining of personal and interpersonal work as foundational to his broader practice.

In 2025, EMU named Guerrier its Alumni of the Year, citing his work as a futurist and artist and specifically his development of collaborative worldbuilding as a mechanism for enabling marginalized voices to conceive and publish stories of their shared universes.

== Visual art practice ==
Guerrier's visual art practice operates in close dialogue with his literary and worldbuilding work. Working primarily in acrylic and oil pastels, he develops paintings that he describes as engaging surrealism, pop art, and diasporic mythologies to examine power, identity, and cultural transformation. His recurring figure Frank the Giraffe serves as a vehicle for speculative narratives set against landscapes marked by political division, climate collapse, and artificial intelligence—drawn explicitly from what Guerrier terms "the radical imagination of those on the margins." In 2025, his painting Frank at the Wilshire Public Library was selected by the Friends of the Wilshire Library (FOWL) in Los Angeles as the winning entry in an open design competition among library patrons, and was reproduced on FOWL merchandise to support library fundraising. In his statement accompanying the work, Guerrier described libraries as "liberatory spaces where imagination can save us," and articulated his understanding of the painting as embodying hopeful futures.

Guerrier has exhibited at the Venice Art Crawl at Beyond Baroque Foundation in Los Angeles (2025) and has been selected as guest faculty at the Esalen Institute, alongside researcher Cassandra Vieten, to lead programs on imagination, futurism, and worldbuilding.

== Career ==
=== Early work and civil society ===
Following his graduation from EMU in 2015, Guerrier was named a PEN Haiti Fellow at PEN America, traveling to Port-au-Prince to work with Haitian poets, writers, and journalists at the PEN Haiti Center. The same year he received the Humanity in Action Fellowship, which involved study in Washington D.C., Berlin, and Paris.

In 2017, Guerrier was appointed National President of Coming to the Table, founded by both Black and white descendants of Thomas Jefferson and Sally Hemings. He has also written as a columnist for Haiti Observateur on the subject of Haitian Futurism—the speculative and artistic engagement with Haiti's past and possible futures.

In 2018, Guerrier was named a Global Shaper by the World Economic Forum and a Shafik Gabr Fellow by the Shafik Gabr Foundation.

=== Syllble Studios ===
In 2018, Guerrier founded Syllble Studios (pronounced "syllable"), which he has described as the first collaborative worldbuilding production house for science fiction and fantasy storytelling. The organization was developed out of Guerrier's research into collaborative writing techniques and an initial session in which he convened three writers to build a story together. Syllble operates by connecting underrepresented writers, visual artists, and creators from different countries, cultures, and backgrounds through artist collectives to co-author shared fictional universes. Syllble was peer-selected out of more than one thousand startups at the Street Pitch competition and was recognized by Washington D.C. Mayor Muriel Bowser's 202Creates initiative as part of the District's creative economy.

In October 2020, Syllble partnered with Moko Magazine Caribbean Arts and Letters to establish the Caribbean Sky Islands, a collaborative fictional world created by Black Caribbean speculative fiction writers.

In May 2021, Guerrier collaborated with the Innovation Station: Creative Industry Lab at the U.S. State Department to convene science fiction writers from around the world through the One Humanity Writing Collective, a program designed to address global challenges through speculative fiction.

In February 2022, Syllble partnered with Brittle Paper magazine to establish the Sauútiverse, described as the first collaborative African fantasy universe. The project, which brought together speculative fiction writers from African nations to build a shared interplanetary world, was covered by The Guardian and received attention in the British Fantasy Society journal and the Vector critical journal of the British Science Fiction Association. A 2026 interview in Brittle Paper with the editors of the Sauúti anthology Terrors continued to document the project's development and its significance for African speculative literature. In 2023, Syllble launched the Regenerative Worldbuilding Collective, oriented toward reshaping future narratives through science fiction, and announced a new collaborative project focused on the alternate history genre. Guerrier's Syllble project the Ayitiverse—a science-fantasy shared world drawing from Haitian history, Afrocentric mythology, and diasporic culture—aims, in his framing, to unravel the universal history of Haiti as the world's first modern Black nation.

== Worldbuilding as a field and public intellectual work ==
Guerrier has been instrumental in establishing collaborative worldbuilding as a recognized interdisciplinary field, situating it at the convergence of speculative fiction, futures studies, social practice, and conflict transformation. He has argued consistently that imagination is not ancillary to social and political life but constitutes a form of critical infrastructure: the capacity to envision radically different futures is, in his formulation, a precondition for transforming present conditions. In 2024, Guerrier delivered the Golo Mann Lecture at the Marian Miner Cook Athenaeum at Claremont McKenna College, titled "Worldbuilding as Future: Creolizing the Ruins of Modernity." The lecture explored how the concept of creolization—the blending of diverse cultural, intellectual, and social elements—can generate new and resilient futures, and how worldbuilding in fiction and imagination functions as a mechanism for navigating environmental, social, and cultural challenges.

He has spoken at the UC Berkeley conference "The World As It Could Be: Speculative Fiction from Around the World," at the RADAR Conference (a decentralized collective of over four hundred researchers, futurists, strategists, and innovators), and participated in a pioneering workshop on the Atlas of Imagination at UC San Diego. He has also served as a review panelist for the selection of the 2024–2025 Leonardo Imagination Fellows, a program administered by ASU-Leonardo, the collaboration between Arizona State University and Leonardo/The International Society for the Arts, Sciences and Technology.

Guerrier's TEDx Talk, "Gone are the days of the lone genius," addresses future transformation and the necessity of collective thinking. He has been featured by the Center for Science and the Imagination at Arizona State University in a conversation on how imagination can be used to create better social futures.

== Awards and honors ==
- 2015: "Humanity in Action" Fellowship
- 2016: PEN America's PEN Haiti Fellow
- 2018: "Global Shaper" at World Economic Forum
- 2018: "Shafik Gabr Fellow" at the Shafik Gabr Foundation
- 2021: Forbes "30 Under 30"
- 2021: Named to The Root's 100 Most Influential African Americans in the United States between the ages of 25 and 45 in the "Arts" category.
- 2022: PEN America's "Emerging Voices Fellow Finalist"
- 2025: Eastern Mennonite University's "Alumni of the Year"

== Bibliography ==
=== Fiction books ===
- Golden Veins (September 2019)
- Medusa's Descendants (November 2022)

=== Non-fiction Books ===
- Breaking Free From Mass-Produced Consciousness: A Little Book for Artists, Entrepreneurs, and the Leaders of Tomorrow (September 2021)

=== Poetry ===
- Egypt in a Cup of Tea (February 2019)
- No More Vagabonds, No More Obscure Wars (November 2023)

=== Anthologies ===
- Slavery's Descendants: Shared Legacies of Race and Reconciliation (May 2019)

=== Short fiction ===
- Magic Mangoes (December 2021)
- Dawn of the Sun (December 2021)
- Bionic Man Story (September 2018)
