= Daniel Wigdor =

- Born: Canada
- Occupations: Computer scientist, entrepreneur, investor, expert witness, and an author

Academic background
- Education: University of Toronto

Daniel Wigdor is a Canadian computer scientist, entrepreneur, investor, expert witness and author. He is the associate chair of Industrial Relations as well as a professor in the Department of Computer Science at the University of Toronto.

Wigdor is most known for his work in Human Computer Interaction, including his work sensing technologies, operating system architectures, AI systems, manufacturing methods, haptic feedback devices, development tools, and software systems. His entrepreneurial endeavors include founding companies, including Iota Wireless, Tactual Labs, and Chatham Labs (sold to Facebook in 2020). Among his authored works are his publications in academic journals, including IEEE Transactions on Visualization and Computer Graphics as well as a book titled Brave NUI World: Designing Natural User Interfaces for Touch and Gesture. Moreover, he is the recipient of 2015 Alfred P. Sloan Research Fellowship in Computer Science.

== Education ==
Wigdor completed his B.S. from the University of Toronto in 2002, followed by an M.S. in Computer Science from the University of Toronto in 2004. Later in 2008, he obtained his PhD in computer science from the same institution, while completing a fellowship at Harvard University.

== Career ==
=== Professional career ===
Wigdor co-founded Iota Wireless in 2003, focusing on text-entry techniques for mobile phones, and worked there until 2010. His tenure at Microsoft spanned from 2008 to 2010. During his time at Microsoft, his work focused on creating high-quality user experiences for Natural User Interfaces.

In 2012, Wigdor co-founded Tactual Labs and served as its director and science advisor until 2016. The startup focused on enhancing high-performance user input for interactive computers. The following year, he co-founded Trace, formerly known as Addem Labs, and served as its science advisor and director until 2022. This Toronto-based startup focused on developing rapid prototyping tools for printed circuit boards. Moreover, in 2018, he co-founded Chatham Labs to conduct research on developing operating systems and platforms for ubiquitous computing. There, he held the position of chief scientist until its acquisition by Facebook in September 2020. Following the acquisition, from 2020 to 2023, he served as director of Meta's Reality Labs Research (RLR) Toronto, which was formerly Chatham Labs.

In 2024, Wigdor co-founded AI studio AXL with Tovi Grossman, David Sharma, and Ray Sharma, and investments from mining executive Rob McEwen and Smart Technologies co-founder David Martin. In June 2025, AXL formed a new strategic partnership to develop legal tools with Dentons.

Wigdor holds over 60 patents for projects in human computer interaction.

=== Expert witness ===
Wigdor has served as an expert witness in high-profile tech-related cases. Notably, he served as a testifying expert witness for Quinn Emanuel in the Apple Inc. v. Samsung Electronics Co., Ltd. case in the US District Court for the Northern District of California, where he prepared expert reports and testified on the invalidity and non-infringement of US patent #8,074,172. Moreover, he also served as an expert witness for Qualcomm, providing testimony on Qualcomm's patent portfolio in the ongoing litigation with Apple Inc. represented by Quinn Emanuel Urquhart & Sullivan, LLP.

=== Academic career ===
Wigdor began his academic journey in 1998, joining the University of Toronto as an undergraduate, where he graduated in 2002, before completing his Masters in 2004 and PhD in 2008. Between 2007 and 2008, he was a fellow at the Initiative in Innovative Computing at Harvard University. From 2010 to 2012, he served as an affiliate assistant professor at the University of Washington. In 2011, he joined the University of Toronto as an assistant professor, a position he held until 2016, after which he became an associate professor, serving from 2016 to 2021. He also had a visiting appointment as an associate professor at Cornell University from 2017 to 2018. Since 2020, he has been the associate chair of Industrial Relations in the Department of Computer Science and a professor at the University of Toronto since 2021.

== Books ==
In 2011, Wigdor collaborated with Dennis Wixon to publish the book Brave NUI World: Designing Natural User Interfaces for Touch and Gesture. In addition, he has made contributions to various books, including Tabletops – Horizontal Interactive Displays and Human-Computer Interaction Handbook: Fundamentals, Evolving Technologies, and Emerging Applications.

== Research ==
Wigdor's research spans operating system architectures, sensing methods, AI systems, interaction techniques, and human-AI interaction. In 2003, he introduced TiltText, an innovative, language-independent technique for text entry on mobile phones, offering a potential improvement in typing speed despite its higher error rate, positioning it among the fastest known methods for this purpose. His 2004 work explored interactive 3D visualization and manipulation techniques using volumetric displays, emphasizing direct gestural interaction with virtual objects enabled by finger motion tracking, within a prototype geometric modeling application. Furthermore, he introduced LucidTouch, a mobile device interface solution enabling users to interact with applications by touching the rear of the device. This approach tackled finger occlusion issues and facilitated multi-touch input, with initial study results indicating a user preference for this method due to reduced occlusion, higher precision, and the ability to use multi-finger input. His 2018 joint study with Z Lu and others presented findings from a mixed methods study on live streaming practices in China, including an online survey of 527 users and interviews with 14 active users, revealing insights into content categories, viewer engagement, reward systems, fan group-chat dynamics, and desires for deeper interaction mechanisms among both viewers and streamers. In 2022, he presented an exhaustive examination of existing methodologies for designing gesture vocabularies, identifying 13 crucial factors influencing their design, evaluating associated evaluation methods and interaction techniques, and proposing future research directions for developing a more holistic and user-centered approach to gesture design.

== Awards and honors ==
- 2004 – Best Paper, Association for Computing Machinery
- 2011 – Best Paper: Honorable Mention, Association for Computing Machinery
- 2014 – Best Paper, Association for Computing Machinery
- 2014 – Early Researcher Awards, Ontario Ministry of Research and Innovation
- 2015 – Best Paper: Honorable Mention, Association for Computing Machinery
- 2015 – Alfred P. Sloan Research Fellowship in Computer Science, Sloan Foundation
- 2016 – Best Paper, Association for Computing Machinery
- 2017 – Best Paper: Honorable Mention, Association for Computing Machinery
- 2018 – Best Paper: Honorable Mention, Association for Computing Machinery
- 2019 – Best Paper, Association for Computing Machinery

== Bibliography ==
=== Books ===
- Brave NUI World: Designing Natural User Interfaces for Touch and Gesture (2011) ISBN 9780123822314

=== Selected articles ===
- Wigdor, D., & Balakrishnan, R. (2003, November). TiltText: using tilt for text input to mobile phones. In Proceedings of the 16th annual ACM symposium on User interface software and technology (pp. 81–90).
- Grossman, T., Wigdor, D., & Balakrishnan, R. (2004, October). Multi-finger gestural interaction with 3d volumetric displays. In Proceedings of the 17th annual ACM symposium on User interface software and technology (pp. 61–70).
- Forlines, C., Wigdor, D., Shen, C., & Balakrishnan, R. (2007, April). Direct-touch vs. mouse input for tabletop displays. In Proceedings of the SIGCHI conference on Human factors in computing systems (pp. 647–656).
- Wigdor, D., Forlines, C., Baudisch, P., Barnwell, J., & Shen, C. (2007, October). Lucid touch: a see-through mobile device. In Proceedings of the 20th annual ACM symposium on User interface software and technology (pp. 269–278).
- Lu, Z., Xia, H., Heo, S., & Wigdor, D. (2018, April). You watch, you give, and you engage: a study of live streaming practices in China. In Proceedings of the 2018 CHI conference on human factors in computing systems (pp. 1–13).
