= Syllble =

American science fiction and fantasy production house and publisher

Syllble, Inc.
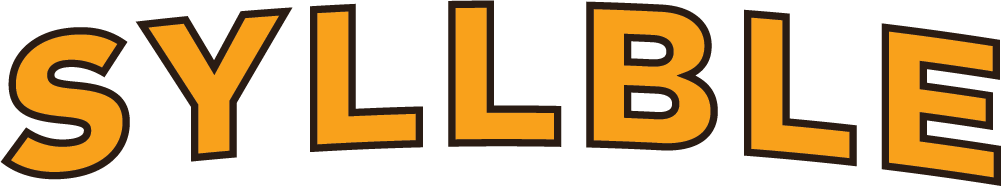
- Type: Private company
- Founded: February 2018; 8 years ago in Washington, DC, U.S.
- Website: syllble.com

Syllble, Inc. is an American science fiction and fantasy production house and publisher. Its aim was to bring more access to underrepresented writers and creative voices from around the world, and in the entertainment business.

In 2020, Syllble's Founder Fabrice Guerrier was highlighted as a Forbes 30 Under 30 in the Art & Style list.

== History ==
In late 2017, Fabrice Guerrier, a Haitian-American science fiction and fantasy writer, gathered three writers at his apartment in Washington D.C. His intention was to foster collaboration among them and collectively produce a short story. This moment sparked the birth of Syllble Studios. Syllble serves as a platform that encourages creative collaboration and facilitates the development of science fiction and fantasy worlds. Its mission is to empower diverse writers to create within artist collectives and fictional worlds.

In October 2020, Syllble partnered with Moko Magazine Caribbean Arts and Letters to establish the Caribbean Sky Islands fictional world and publish stories from Black Caribbean speculative fiction writers.

In May 2021, Guerrier collaborated with The Innovation Station: Creative Industry Lab at the U.S. State Department to bring science fiction writers from around the world to solve some of the world's toughest global challenges through the One Humanity Writing Collective.

In February 2022, Syllble partnered with Brittle Paper magazine to establish the first collaborative African fantasy universe, called Sauúti.

In July 2022, Hollywood executive and film producer Sandy Climan joined Syllble's advisory board.
