= Yingke =

Commercial law firm in Beijing, China

Yingke Law Firm
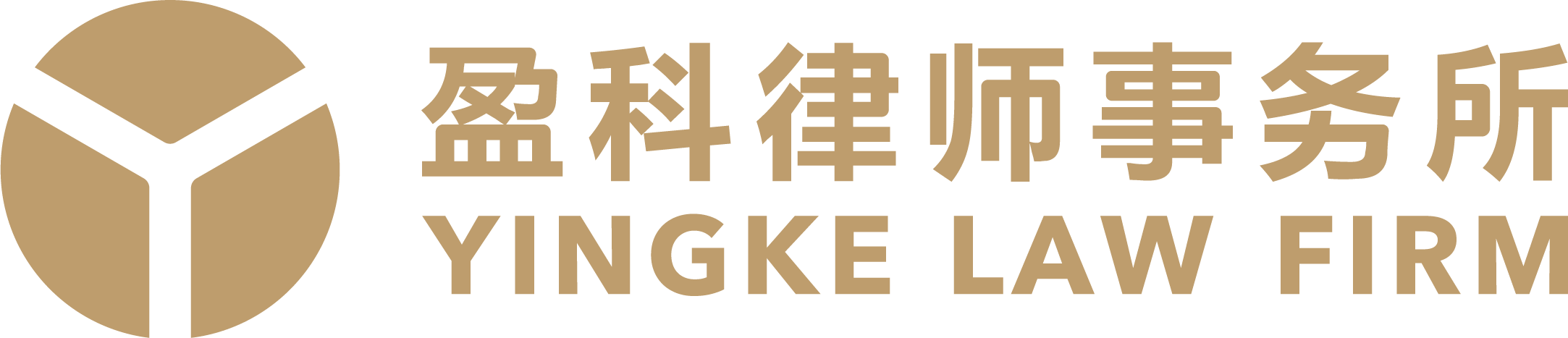
- Headquarters: Beijing, China
- No. of offices: 80
- No. of employees: Over 10,000 lawyers
- Major practice areas: General practice
- Revenue: $624,000,000 gross revenue in 2018 RMB450 million (£48 million) (2012) $445 million (2018)
- Date founded: August 14, 2001 (Beijing)
- Company type: Special general partnership
- Website: www.yingkelawyer.com

Yingke Law Firm (Yingke) is an international commercial law firm headquartered in Beijing, China. It is the largest China-based law firm measured by number of lawyers.

The firm has offices across mainland China and an international legal services network comprising overseas operations and cooperating law firms. In a statement dated 1 January 2026, Yingke reported 127 branches in mainland China and a global network covering 199 cities in 104 countries and territories.

Yingke's practice encompasses corporate and commercial law, international trade and investment, dispute resolution, finance and capital markets, intellectual property, real estate and construction, restructuring and insolvency, employment, and private client matters. Its international work includes advising on overseas investments, commercial transactions and disputes involving multiple jurisdictions.

Some overseas law practices within Yingke's international network operate under the name YK Law. These practices are separately constituted legal entities, established and regulated in their respective jurisdictions, and are legally distinct from Yingke's mainland Chinese practice.

== Origin of the name ==
Yingke (盈科) takes its name from the Confucian classic Mencius. The expression "盈科而后进", found in Li Lou (《离娄》), describes water filling the hollows in its course before continuing towards the sea. The image conveys the idea of advancing step by step, establishing firm foundations through sustained effort.

Traditional commentaries relate it to learning and personal cultivation. Zhu Xi explains the expression as "言其进以渐也", meaning that progress takes place gradually. A related passage in Jin Xin (《尽心》) draws a parallel between water filling the hollows in its path and a person developing the understanding needed to advance in learning. Zhu Xi's further explanation, "足于此而通于彼", emphasises becoming sufficiently accomplished at one stage before progressing to the next. These interpretations associate the expression with patient effort, thoroughness and the steady accumulation of knowledge and abilitiy. Yingke has cited these passages as a source of inspiration for the firm's culture and development.

== Yingke Law Firm — Awards and Rankings ==
As at 30 October 2026. The following recognitions relate to Yingke Law Firm and, where specified, its Chinese regional offices.

1. The Global 200 — Global Lawyer Headcount Ranking (2026)
  According to the firm's September 2026 announcement, Yingke ranked first globally by lawyer headcount in the 2026 edition of The Global 200. This is a ranking by firm size.
2. Asian Legal Business — Asia Top 50 Largest Law Firms (2025)
  Yingke ranked first in the domestic firms category of the ALB Asia Top 50 Largest Law Firms 2025. The ranking measures the number of lawyers based in Asia.
3. Chambers Greater China Region Guide (2026)
  Yingke received 29 department rankings, encompassing practice areas and regional categories. These included:
  - Band 1: Corporate/Commercial: PRC Firms in Gansu, Hainan, Hebei and Inner Mongolia.
  - Band 4: Private Client/ Wealth Management: PRC Firms.
4. The legal 500 — Greater China Rankings (2026)
  Yingke received 10 practice and regional rankings, together with a separate Firms to Watch listing:
  - Tier 1: Regional coverage — Shaanxi Province: Xi'an.
  - Tier 2: Private wealth: PRC firms.
  - Tier 3: Fintech: PRC firms; regional coverage in Guangdong Province, covering Guangzhou and Shenzhen; and regional coverage in Sichuan Province, covering Chengdu and including Chongqing.
  - Tier 4: Dispute resolution: Litigation; contentious intellectual property; labour and employment; real estate and construction; and shipping, each withint the relevant PRC firms category.
  - Firms to Watch: Corporate and M&A: PRC firms.
5. China Business Law Journal — China Business Law Awards (2025-2026)
  Yingke was named among the winning firms in the following categories:
  - 2026: Family wealth management.
  - 2025: Family wealth management; and AI, technology & telecoms.
  These results represent consecutive recognition in family wealth management in 2025 and 2026. The awards recognise multiple firms within each category and do not assign numerical positions to the winners.
6. Asian Legal Business — China Practice and Regional Rankings (2026)
  Yingke's published announcements report the following results:
  - China Dispute Resolution Rankings — Arbitration: Tier 3.
  - China Dispute Resolution Rankings — Litigation: Notable Firms.
  - Intellectual Property Rankings — Copyright/Trademark: Notable Firms.
  - China Regional Ranking — Bohai Rim: Inclusion in the Notable Firm list, covering Liaoning, Hebei, Shandong and Tianjin.
7. LEGALBAND — China Top Ranked Law Firms (2026)
  Yingke received recognition in four practice areas:
  - Band 3: Private wealth management.
  - Rising Law Firm: Cybersecurity and data compliance.
  - Rising Law Firm: Intellectual property litigation.
  - Rising Law Firm: Shipping.
8. Benchmark Litigation — China Rankings (2026)
  Yingke received the following national and regional rankigns:
  - China — National: Other Notable Firms in construction and insolvency.
  - Jiangsu: Recommended for construction and real estate; Other Notable Firms for commercial disputes.
  - Shaanxi: Tier 3 for commercial disputes.
  - Fujian: Other Notable Firms for commercial disputes.

== Timeline of International Practice ==
| Jurisdiction | Timeline |
|---|---|
| Hungary | September 2010 Yingke and Rupert Várnai established Yingke Várnai, a joint practice in Budapest. |
| Italy | March 2011 Yingke and its Italian partners established a joint practice in Verona. |
| Poland | 13 February 2012 Yingke held its Warsaw office opening. |
| Türkiye | 16 February 2012 Yingke held its Istanbul office opening. |
| United States | 23 February 2012 Yingke held its New York office opening. 2019 Jesse Weiner and Henry Li established YK Law LLP in New York and opened its Los Angeles office. |
| Brazil | By March 2012 The lawyer had reported the opening of Yingke's São Paulo office. |
| Isreal | April 2013 Local firm Eyal Khayat Zolty, Neiger & Co adopted the name Yingke Israel under a cooperation agreement. |
| Germany | September 2015 Yingke inaugurated its German office and the Yingke Koehler China Center in Berlin. |
| Czechia | October 2015 Yingke established its Czech practice in Prague. |
| Slovakia | October 2015 Yingke established its Slovak practice in Bratislava. |
| Kazakhstan | 31 May 2016 Colibri signed an agreement to join the Yingke network. |
| Kyrgyzstan | 31 May 2016 Kalikova & Associates signed an agreement to join the Yingke network. |
| Thailand | 2017 - 2021 Yingke partnered with regional law firm DFDL in Thailand. July 2023 Yingke opened its own office in Bangkok. |
| Australia | June 2020 Yingke Australia established its Sydney practice. November 2023 YK Law Melbourne was established as a local practice in Victoria. |
| Tanzania | May 2023 Yingke established its Tanzanian office in Dar es Salaam. |
| Argentina | 2023 YK Law Abogado S.A. was established in Argentina. By February 2024 The firm had opened its Buenos Aires office. |
| Malaysia | 24 June 2024 Yingke held its Kuala Lumpur office opening. July 2026 The IN GLOBAL Legal & Business Alliance, whose launch Yingke Malaysia Consulting co-organised, designated Kuala Lumpur as its overseas operations centre. |
| Japan | 29 July 2024 Yingke held its Tokyo office opening. |
| France | 20 September 2024 Yingke inaugurated its Paris office and its France service centre. |
| England and Wales(United Kingdom) | 23 September 2024 Yingke opened its London office. By March 2026 the office had closed. |
| Indonesia | 2024 Yingke Indonesia was established in Jakarta. 18 December 2025 The Chongqing RCEP Investment and Trade Service Centre opened its Indonesian branch at Yingke's Jakarta office. |

== Main practice areas ==
Yingke's main practice areas include:

- capital markets
- mergers and acquisitions
- dispute resolution
- commercial litigation
- employment and industrial relations
- entertainment
- financial services regulation
- insurance
- intellectual property
- real estate
- restructuring and insolvency
- taxations

== See also ==
- List of largest Chinese law firms
- Legal history of China
- Chinese law
