= Estee Portnoy =

American business executive

- Born: Estee Mermelstein; New Castle, Pennsylvania
- Education: University of Michigan
- Occupation: Business Executive
- Spouse: Elliott Portnoy
- Parents: Martin Portnoy (father); Yaffa Weichleder (mother)

Estee Portnoy (née Estee Mermelstein) is an American business executive. She is business manager and spokesperson for National Basketball Association Hall of Fame basketball player Michael Jordan.

== Early life and education ==
Portnoy was born in New Castle, Pennsylvania. She worked at the New Castle Public Library while in high school appr. 1982. Portnoy attended the University of Michigan in Ann Arbor where she was an honors graduate in Marketing. She also received an MBA in Marketing from the University of Maryland.

== Career ==
Portnoy began her career in sports marketing at the University of Michigan in the Athletic Public Relations Office and as a member of the Board in Control of Inter-Collegiate Athletics.

As business manager to Michael Jordan, Portnoy has been part of his inner circle for more than two decades.

She also serves on the Executive Team of the NBA’s Charlotte Hornets, of which Jordan is majority owner.

== Executive producer ==
Portnoy is an executive producer of The Last Dance, a 10-part documentary series on Michael Jordan and the Chicago Bulls dynasty.

== Boards and recognition ==
Portnoy serves on the Sport Management Advisory Board for the Sport Management Program at the University of Michigan School of Kinesiology.

Portnoy was on the B'nai B'rith Youth Organization (BBYO) International Board of Directors in 2006 and one of its past chairs.

Together with her husband, Portnoy is founder of KEEN USA, a nonprofit organization that provides sports and recreation activities to children with disabilities in Chicago, Los Angeles, New York, Phoenix, San Francisco, St. Louis and Washington DC.

She was also part of the National Advisory Council for the Make-A-Wish Foundation, and is currently on the Executive Committee of Hillel International’s Board of Directors.

In 2021, Portnoy joined a group making an investment in Washington Spirit soccer club.

== Awards ==
- Outstanding Service to Youth Award from the Montgomery County Commission on Children & Youth (1999)
- S. Robert Cohen Award from the Jewish Foundation for Group Homes (2006)
- Jewish Women International’s “Woman to Watch” (2009)
- BBYO’s Kol Echad Award (2014)

== Personal life ==
Portnoy is married to Elliott Portnoy, an attorney. The couple met as teenagers at a BBYO event. They reside outside of Washington, DC. They have three children.
