= Patrick Peacock =

Canadian lawyer (1943–2022)

J. Patrick Peacock KC

60th President of the Canadian Bar Association
- In office 1988–1989
- Preceded by: The Hon. Jean Bazin, Q.C. Ad.E.
- Succeeded by: The Hon. John R.R. Jennings

President of the Alberta Branch of the Canadian Bar Association
- In office 1983–1984

President of the Calgary Bar Association
- In office 1978–1978

President of the Calgary Stampeder Football Club
- In office 1985–1986

Personal details
- Born: 2 July 1943 Calgary, Alberta, Canada
- Died: 4 December 2022 (aged 79) Vancouver, British Columbia, Canada
- Education: University of Alberta: B.A., LL.B.
- Profession: Lawyer

J. Patrick Peacock KC (2 July 1943 – 4 December 2022) was a Canadian lawyer in Calgary, Alberta. He specialized in litigation and was very active in the legal profession. He was the national president of the Canadian Bar Association from 1988 to 1989. He was also the president of the Calgary Stampeders in the Canadian Football League from 1985 to 1986.

== Early life and education ==
Peacock was born in Calgary on 2 July 1943. He attended the University of Alberta earning a Bachelor of Arts degree in 1964, followed by a Bachelor of Laws degree with distinction in 1967.

== Legal career ==
Peacock was admitted to the Alberta Bar in 1968. Practising in Calgary, he specialized in civil litigation and appeals. In 1994, he was the founding partner in the firm of Peacock, Linder, Halt and Mack, a boutique law firm specializing in civil litigation. The firm has been recognized as one of the best boutique law firms specializing in civil litigation in Canada.

Peacock received a large number of recognitions of his abilities from legal professional organizations. In 1984, he was appointed Queen's Counsel. In 2011, he received the Distinguished Service Award from the Law Society of Alberta and the Alberta Branch of the CBA for his service to the profession. He was also an honorary life member of the Law Society of Saskatchewan. Peacock was recognized several times by the "Best Lawyers" peer review organization, an international group centred in the United States.

== Canadian Bar Association ==
Peacock was highly active in the Canadian Bar Association, serving as president of the Alberta Branch of the CBA from 1983 to 1984, and as national president from 1988 to 1989. He was also on a range of CBA committees and the national council (from 1972).

Peacock also served as president of the Calgary Bar Association in 1978.

== Calgary Stampeders ==
Peacock was a long-time supporter of the Calgary Stampeders in the CFL. He was an associate director of the Calgary Stampeders Football Club from 1973 to 1979; a Director from 1979 to 1985; and President 1985–1986. As President of the Stampeders, he also served as Vice Chairman of the Board of Governors of the Canadian Football League in 1985.

Peacock was also a member of the Calgary Booster Club.

== Personal life and death ==
Peacock died in Vancouver on 4 December 2022, at the age of 79.

== Honours ==
- 1984 – appointed Queen's Counsel
- 2011 – Distinguished Service Award, Alberta Branch of the Canadian Bar Association
- honorary life membership in the Law Society of Saskatchewan
