= 225 Liberty Street =

Office skyscraper in Manhattan, New York

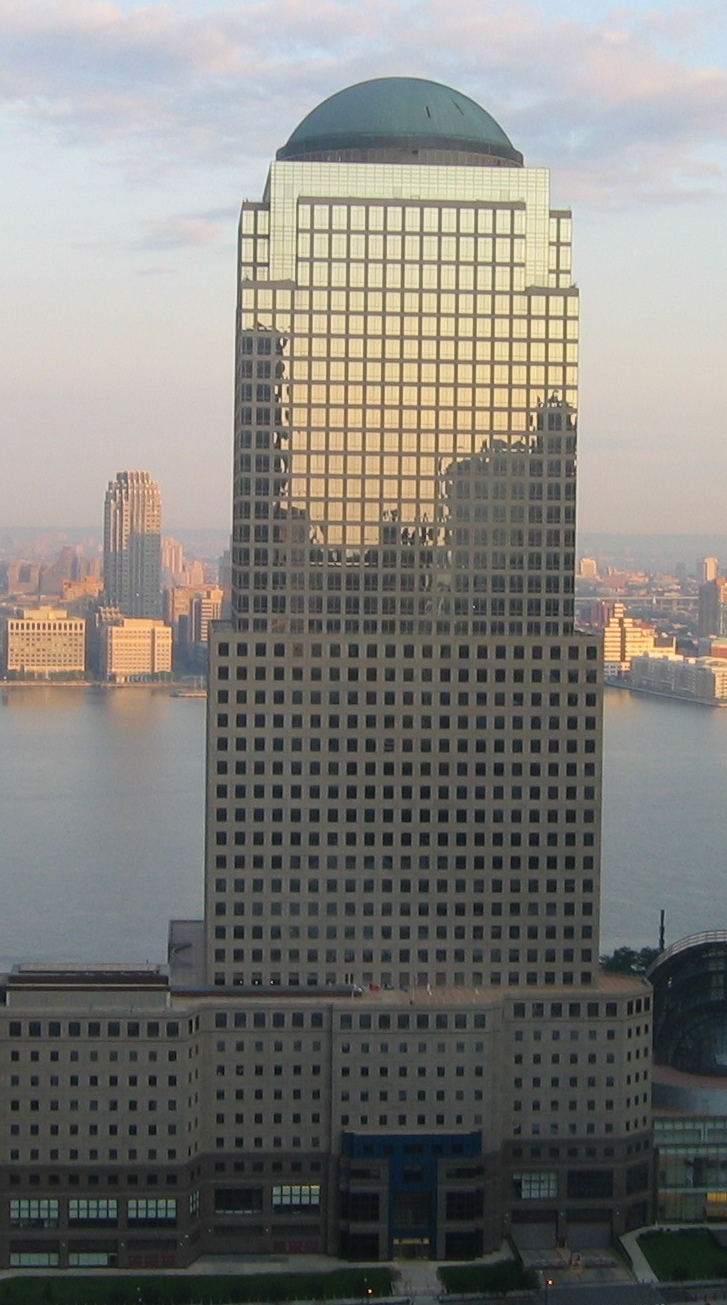
- Interactive map of the 225 Liberty Street area

General information
- Location: West Street between Liberty Street and Vesey Streets; New York, NY 10007, United States
- Coordinates: 40°42′45″N 74°00′55″W
- Construction started: 1985
- Completed: 1987
- Cost: US$800 million
- Owner: Brookfield Properties

Height
- Roof: 645 ft (197 m)

Technical details
- Floor count: 44
- Floor area: 2,667,222 sq ft (247,793.0 m^{2})

Design and construction
- Architects: Haines Lundberg Waehler, Cesar Pelli & Associates
- Structural engineer: Thornton-Tomasetti Engineers

225 Liberty Street, formerly known as Two World Financial Center, is one of four towers that comprise the Brookfield Place complex in the Battery Park City, directly adjacent to the Financial District of Lower Manhattan in New York City. Rising 44 floors and 645 feet (197 m), it is situated between the Hudson River and the World Trade Center. Though the building has a nominal address on Liberty Street, its most prominent facade is on West Street between Liberty and Vesey Streets. The building opened in 1987 as part of the World Financial Center and was designed by Haines Lundberg Waehler and Cesar Pelli & Associates.

The building is home to Dotdash Meredith, College Board, BNY Mellon, Hudson's Bay Company, Commerzbank, Fiserv, Oppenheimer Funds, Inc., State Street Corporation, McElroy, Deutsch, Virtusa, Mulvaney & Carpenter, LLP, Thacher Proffitt & Wood, LLP, and several divisions of Orange Group, among other companies. It is an example of postmodern architecture, as designed by Cesar Pelli & Associates, and contains over 2,491,000 square feet (231,400 m^{2}) of rentable office area. It connects to the rest of the World Financial Center complex through a courtyard leading to the Winter Garden, a dramatic glass-and-steel public space with a 120-foot vaulted ceiling under which there is an assortment of trees and plants, including sixteen 12-meter palm trees from the Mojave Desert.

The building was renamed from Two World Financial Center when the rest of the complex was renamed Brookfield Place in 2014.

225 Liberty Street and its neighbors had been severely damaged by the falling debris when the World Trade Center towers collapsed due to the September 11 attacks. The building had to be closed for repairs until May 2002 as a result of damage sustained in the terrorist attacks.

== See also ==
- World Trade Center
- Brookfield Place (New York City)
- List of tallest buildings in New York City
