= Judith Goldstein =

American author, historian and human rights leader

Judith S. Goldstein is an American author, historian and human rights leader. Her work has focused primarily on diversity, immigration and postwar history concerning Europe and the United States. She founded Humanity in Action, an international educational organization, in 1997 and serves as its executive director. As an author, she has largely been collected by libraries worldwide.

Goldstein authored the book Crossing Lines: Histories of Jews and Gentiles in Three Communities, published in 1992 by William Morrow and Inventing Great Neck: Jewish Identity and the American Dream, published in 2006 by Rutgers University Press.

Goldstein is also the president of the Somes Pond Center, dedicated to landscape history and preservation on Mt. Desert Island, Maine. She sits on the board of the Center for Artistic Activism and the Francis Perkins Center. She is also a member of The Council on Foreign Relations.

== Work in immigration and diversity ==
Following her doctoral studies, Goldstein began her career in immigration and diversity issues in Europe and the United States. At the Columbia Center for Oral History at Columbia University, she pursued a project on Ethnic Groups and American Foreign Policy. In the 1980s, after ten years working on this project, Goldstein began working on her book Crossing Lines: Histories of Jews and Gentiles in Three Communities. The book, published in 1992 by William Morrow, chronicles the integration of Jewish immigrants in Maine. Goldstein then served as the executive director of Thanks to Scandinavia, a non-profit organization.

== Humanity in Action ==
In 1997, Goldstein founded Humanity in Action, an international nonprofit organization that educates and connects young people who seek to become leaders on issues related to human and minority rights. As executive director and founder, Goldstein has expanded the organization to include offices in Bosnia and Herzegovina, Denmark, The Netherlands, Poland, Germany and France. Fellowship programs send undergraduate and graduate students abroad to study human rights, immigration and diversity in Europe and the United States. Goldstein serves a Humanity in Action's executive director.

== Publications ==
- The Politics of Ethnic Pressure: The American Jewish Committee Fight Against Immigration Restriction: 1906-1917, New York (Garland Publishing, 1990)
- Crossing Lines: Histories of Jews and Gentiles in Three Communities (William Morrow; March 20, 1992)
- "Alone with Charlotte Salomon," Partisan Review, vol. 1, 2002
- "Anne Frank: the Redemptive Myth," Partisan Review, vol. 1, 2003
- Inventing Great Neck: Jewish Identity and American Dreams (Rutgers University Press, October, 2006)
- Humanity in Action: Collected Essays and Talks (2014)

== Interviews and lectures ==
In an August 2021 Podcast Interview, Goldstein discussed the fragility of democracy and the need for vigilance against totalitarianism. She outlined the mission of Humanity in Action to promote dialogue on diversity and democratic values through its international fellowship programs, which have engaged over 2,500 participants since 1997. Goldstein also emphasized the role of challenging questions in fostering critical thinking and described “friendship and trust” as central to her work.
