= SNR Denton =

Law firms of the United Kingdom

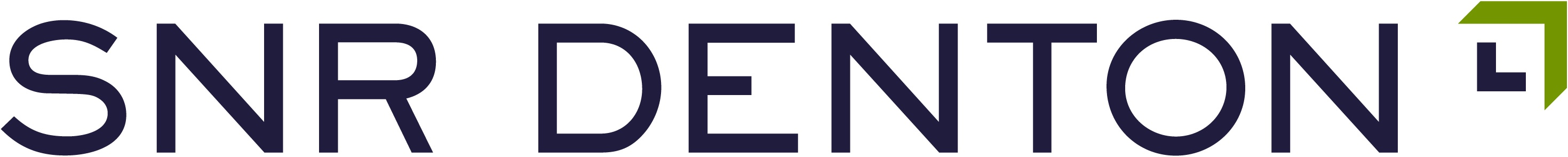
- Headquarters: London, United Kingdom, Washington, D.C., United States
- No. of offices: 60
- No. of attorneys: Approximately 1,250
- Key people: Elliott Portnoy (Chief executive); Joseph Andrew (Chairman)
- Revenue: £450 million (2011/12)
- Profit per equity partner: £438,000 (2011/12)
- Date founded: 2010 (by merger)
- Company type: Swiss Verein
- Dissolved: 28 March 2013 (merged with Salans and Fraser Milner Casgrain to form Dentons)
- Website: SNR Denton

SNR Denton was a multinational law firm co-headquartered in London and Washington, D.C. The firm operated in 60 locations across 43 countries and had around 1,250 lawyers. It was one of the 25-largest law firms in the world, with revenues of around $750 million in 2011/12.

SNR Denton was formed through the merger of the UK-based Denton Wilde Sapte LLP and the US-based Sonnenschein Nath & Rosenthal LLP in September 2010. The firm was structured as a Swiss Verein and had a single management board but the partnerships of the predecessor firms were not financially integrated. In March 2013, SNR Denton merged with the international law firm Salans and the Canada-based law firm Fraser Milner Casgrain, forming Dentons.

The American Lawyer estimated SNR Denton to be the 29th largest law firm in the world by number of lawyers and 43rd by annual revenue in 2012, its last full year of operation.

== History ==
In 1785, Thomas Wilde (1758-1821) and Samuel Archer Hussey founded a law firm that became Wilde Sapte. In 1788, Denton Hall Burgin was established by Sam Denton. In 1906, Edward Sonnenschein and partners opened a law firm in Chicago that eventually became Sonnenschein Nath Rosenthal.

In 2000, the City of London-based law firms Denton Hall and Wilde Sapte merged to form Denton Wilde Sapte. In 2009, 100 lawyers (including 40 partners) joined Sonnenschein from Thacher Proffitt & Wood, doubling the firm's number of lawyers in New York. In May 2010, Denton Wilde Sapte and Sonnenschein Nath & Rosenthal announced their intention to merge. On 30 September 2010, the merger between Denton Wilde Sapte and Sonnenschein Nath & Rosenthal was formally completed, establishing SNR Denton.

On 11 November 2012, SNR Denton, Salans and the Canada-based Fraser Milner Casgrain announced a three-way merger, forming a new law firm structured as a Swiss Verein and named Dentons. The partners of the three firms ratified the merger on 28 November 2012 and the new firm began operations on 28 March 2013.

== Main practice areas ==
SNR Denton's main practice areas included:

- Banking and finance
- Capital markets
- Corporate and business transactions
- Employment, benefits and executive compensation
- Intellectual property and technology
- Litigation and arbitration
- Public policy and regulation
- Real estate
- Restructuring and insolvency
- Tax
- Trusts and estates
