= Haarmann Hemmelrath =

- Headquarters: Munich, Germany
- Revenue: €130 million (2005)
- Date founded: 1987
- Company type: Partnerschaftsgesellschaft
- Website: haarmannhemmelrath.com

Haarmann Hemmelrath was a German professional services firm which provided legal services, audit counsel and tax advice. Haarmann Hemmelrath was founded in Munich in 1987 and at its peak employed 650 professionals, including 350 attorneys in 22 offices worldwide. It was broken up in 2006.

== History ==
Haarmann Hemmelrath was founded in Munich in 1987. Haarmann Hemmelrath grew quickly, becoming one of a small number of German law firms to build a successful international network in Western Europe, Eastern Europe and Asia.

During 2000, Haarmann Hemmelrath opened offices in London, Belgium and Moscow.

In February 2004, Haarmann Hemmelrath completed a major internal restructuring, including the overhaul of its partnership structure and profits distribution system.

In July 2005 one of Haarmann Hemmelrath's founding partners, Wilhelm Haarmann, announced their intention to leave the firm following disagreements over the firm's strategy.

In 2006 Haarmann Hemmelrath disintegrated as a result of continuing internal feuds over the distribution of profits in the partnership. Its Berlin and Shanghai offices joined Anglo-French firm Salans while most of its London and Frankfurt offices joined Squire, Sanders & Dempsey. White & Case absorbed the firm's Munich office to launch in that city. The Moscow office split up, with two partners joining LeBoeuf, Lamb, Greene & MacRae, and the rest of the 28-strong team joining CMS Hasche Sigle. In January 2006, Wilhem Haarmann launched a boutique law firm in Frankfurt am Main, Haarmann, with several former Haarmann Hemmelrath attorneys and tax advisors.

Commentators viewed Haarmann Hemmelrath's collapse as another indicator that independent German law firms were unable to compete with international British and American heavyweights that had been making inroads into the German legal market. Many medium to large sized German firms had merged with international firms in the late 1990s and early 2000s, for example Pünder, Volhard, Weber & Axster which joined with Clifford Chance and Boesebeck Droste with Lovells, both in 1999. The following year Bruckhaus Westrick Heller Löber and Deringer Tessin Herrmann & Sedemund merged with UK-based Freshfields to form Freshfields Bruckhaus Deringer.

== Offices ==
Haarmann Hemmelrath had offices in the following locations:

- Berlin
- Bielefeld
- Brussels
- Bucharest
- Budapest
- Cologne
- Düsseldorf
- Frankfurt
- Hamburg
- Leipzig
- London
- Milan
- Moscow
- Munich
- Paris
- Prague
- Shanghai
- Singapore
- Stuttgart
- Vienna
- Warsaw
- Tokyo
