= Sonnenschein Nath & Rosenthal =

American international law firm

Sonnenschein Nath & Rosenthal LLP
- Headquarters: Chicago, Illinois, U.S.
- No. of offices: 13
- No. of attorneys: Approximately 800
- Major practice areas: General practice
- Key people: Elliott Portnoy (Chairman)
- Date founded: 1906
- Company type: Limited liability partnership
- Dissolved: September 2010 (merged with Denton Wilde Sapte to form SNR Denton)

Sonnenschein Nath & Rosenthal LLP (informally Sonnenschein) was an international law firm with nearly 800 lawyers and other professionals in the United States and Europe, serving businesses, non-profits and individuals. The firm was founded in Chicago in 1906 and as of May 2010 ranked as the 58th-largest law firm in the U.S. by revenue. In September 2010 it merged with London-based Denton Wilde Sapte to form SNR Denton.

== History ==
=== 20th century ===
- 1906 – Firm is founded in Chicago by Edward Sonnenschein, Maurice Berkson and Isadore Blumenthal.
- 1907 – Hugo Sonnenschein joins the firm.
- 1918 – David Levinson joins the firm
- 1923 – Firm represents Sears, Roebuck and Company in selling buildings at State and Madison Streets, at the time the world's most valuable retail location and Chicago's biggest property deal.
- 1926 – Samuel Rosenthal joins the firm.
- 1928 – Bernard Nath becomes partner.
- 1932 – Sears establishes Allstate, the nation's first company to sell insurance nationally through the mail; Sonnenschein is named counsel to the company.
- 1935 – Sonnenschein becomes Chicago's second-largest law firm.
- 1951 – Developer Arthur Rubloff retains Sonnenschein to handle the Evergreen Plaza Shopping Center, one of the country's largest at the time, on Chicago's far Southwest Side. The firm would later assist Rubloff with the development of Carl Sandburg Village on Chicago's Near North Side, a residential property that helped the area become one of the city's most desirable neighborhoods.
- 1966 – Partner Donald Lubin is retained by McDonald's and joins the company's board a year later. He goes on to become McDonald's longest serving director as well as chairman of its governance committee, secretary of the audit committee, and a member of the executive and finance committees. He retired from the board in 2007. Today, he is a trustee and vice president of Ronald McDonald House Charities.
- 1975 – Firm moves into the Sears Tower.
- 1976 – Jean Allard joins the firm as its first female partner.
- 1977 – Partner Edwin Rothschild, president of the board of the Illinois ACLU, agrees to defend the First Amendment right of a band of neo-Nazis to march in Skokie, Illinois despite his personal disdain for the group. Skokie is home to 7,000 survivors of Nazi death camps.
- 1985 – Harold Shapiro is elected the first chairman; New York City office opens; Sonnenschein represents G.D. Searle & Co. in the sale of the company to Monsanto.
- 1986 – Sonnenschein's Washington, D.C., office opens.
- 1987 – First West Coast office opens in San Francisco.
- 1990 – The firm's name becomes Sonnenschein Nath & Rosenthal; offices open in St. Louis and Los Angeles.
- 1991 – 150 Sonnenschein attorneys assist in the representation of McDonnell Douglas after the U.S. government terminated its order for the A-12 carrier-based stealth bomber. The case, which settled in 2014 for $400,000,000, involved the largest contract termination claim ever filed against the U.S. government; Donald Lubin is named the firm's second chairman.
- 1993 – Sears decides to spin off several of its largest holdings, and Sonnenschein handles it all, including a $2.4 billion transaction for Allstate, then the largest IPO in American history.
- 1994 – Kansas City office opens.
- 1997 – Duane Quaini becomes Sonnenschein's first full-time chairman.

=== 21st century ===
- 2002 – In the firm's seventh year as national coordinating counsel and lead trial counsel for Prudential Insurance Company of America, a Sonnenschein team obtains a defense verdict against alleged multibillion-dollar damages. The jury trial lasted two months; New Jersey office opens in Short Hills.
- 2005 – Firm opens the Legacy Charter School in Chicago's North Lawndale neighborhood, one of the city's most economically challenged. Sonnenschein pledges a $1 million contribution along with management and operational support.
- 2006 – Sonnenschein celebrates its centennial anniversary; firm expands into Phoenix and opens first European office in Brussels.
- 2007 – Firm opens offices in Silicon Valley and Dallas; Elliott Portnoy becomes the firm's youngest chairman at age 41.
- 2008 – Zurich office opens.
- 2009 – Approximately 100 lawyers (including 40 partners) join Sonnenschein from Thacher Proffitt & Wood, doubling the firm's New York presence.
- May 2010 – Sonnenschein and the London-based law firm Denton Wilde Sapte announced their intention to merge.
- 30 September 2010 – the merger between Sonnenschein and Denton Wilde Sapte was formally completed, establishing SNR Denton.

== Notable clients ==
Notable clients of Sonnenschein included:

- The Allstate Corporation
- American International Group, Inc.
- Bank of America Corporation
- The Boeing Company
- Citigroup, Inc.
- Deutsche Bank
- Farmers Insurance Group
- Federal Deposit Insurance Corporation
- Fireman's Fund Insurance Company
- Fresenius Medical Care (North America)
- General Electric Company
- Genworth Financial Inc.
- Goldman Sachs Group Inc.
- JPMorgan Chase
- S. C. Johnson & Son
- Kansas City Southern Industries
- Lance Armstrong Foundation
- Leo Burnett Co., Inc.
- McDonald's Corporation
- Mediacom Communications Corp
- Morgan Stanley
- NBC Universal
- New York Life Insurance Company
- The Northern Trust Company
- PriceWaterhouseCoopers
- Prudential Financial, Inc.
- Royal & SunAlliance
- SAP AG
- Sara Lee Corporation
- Sears Holdings Corporation
- InterContinental Hotels Group
- Sony Corporation
- Sprint Nextel Corporation
- St. Paul Travelers
- Starwood
- Sun Chemical
- Sun Microsystems, Inc.
- Symantec Corporation
- Tribune Company
- United States Department of the Treasury
- Vans, Inc.
- Vivendi Universal
- Vonage
- Walgreens Co.
- WellPoint (now Anthem)
- Yahoo! Inc.

== Notable matters ==
- In a case that began in 2002, Sonnenschein won a major trademark case for S.C. Johnson & Son, Inc., regarding its Off-based family of marks. S.C. Johnson alleged trademark infringement by the defendant, Buzz Off Insect Shield, LLC. At the 2007 trial, a jury found Buzz Off liable for trademark infringement and determined that the infringing conduct was willful and intentional. In March 2009, the judge issued a permanent injunction, nationwide, requiring Buzz Off (as well as all of its vendors) to cease using "Buzz Off" in virtually all respects, including on the Internet.
- Sonnenschein represented German-based Fresenius Medical Care, a DAX-30 company, in transactions highlighted by its $4.5 billion acquisition of Renal Care Group by merger in 2005, and also including its $500 million sale of dialysis service businesses to a private equity buyer and its $100+ million acquisition of Renal Solutions Inc, a medical device manufacturer.
- On appeal, Sonnenschein obtained victories for DIRECTV, Inc. in two unanimous published decisions in the 3rd and 5th U.S. Circuit Courts of Appeal. The rulings in DIRECTV, Inc. v. Bennett and DIRECTV, Inc. v. Leto established precedents for companies that rely on the Federal Wiretap Act and the Federal Communications Act in combating satellite and cable piracy.
- The firm represented WellPoint, the nation's largest health insurer, in its $6.5 billion acquisition in 2006 of WellChoice, the Blue Cross insurer of five million people in New York and New Jersey.
- Sonnenschein represented EMI Group Limited, a major music company, in connection with its participation in the MySpace Music joint venture and related agreements authorizing MySpace Music's digital distribution of EMI's sound recordings and music videos in connection with, among other things, ad-supported streaming and e-commerce offerings including downloads and ringtones.
- Attorneys at the firm represented the $44 billion (in assets) Brazilian industrial conglomerate Votorantim Cementos North America Inc. and its affiliate St. Marys Cement Inc. in the 2008 acquisition of Prairie Material Sales Inc., the largest independent ready-mix concrete company in the Midwest.
- Sonnenschein advised Sonitrol Holding LLC and an ownership group comprising Spire Capital Partners, Carlyle Venture Partners and Wachovia Capital Partners in Sonitrol's 2008 sale to The Stanley Works for $275 million. Sonitrol, a leading provider of security monitoring services, access control and fire detection systems, is the 8th-largest electronic security company in the United States.
- Sonnenschein is representing the investment banking firm William Blair & Company LLC as financial advisor to gum and candy maker The Wrigley Company in connection with its $23 billion merger with Mars, Inc., one of the world's leading confectionery companies.

=== Hurricane Katrina litigation ===
- Chehardy v. Allstate, et al. / Vanderbrook v. Unitrin, et al., (App. No. 07-302119, reported at 495 F.3d 191 (5th Cir. August 2, 2007)): One of the most significant issues in the massive Hurricane Katrina litigation was whether the insurers' standard flood exclusions applied to preclude flood damage resulting from the hurricane, even if the cause of the flooding was something man-made, such as the failure of the New Orleans levees. The Federal Court in Louisiana, per Judge Duval, held that the flood exclusions would not apply in this circumstance. Sonnenschein represented one of the lead parties in the appeal of Judge Duval's order to the 5th U.S. Circuit Court of Appeals, which reversed the prior adverse district court decision and ruled that the flood exclusion in the homeowners policies at issue applied to all floods, whether man-made or naturally occurring. The court also held that the Hurricane Deductible Endorsement did not provide or expand coverage to include damage caused by flooding. This decision saved the insurance industry billions of dollars in potential exposure.
- In re Katrina, (App. No. 08-30145, reported at 524 F.3d 700 (5th Cir. April 11, 2008)): In this matter, the state of Louisiana filed a class action, in Louisiana state court, against more than 200 homeowner insurance companies, including several Sonnenschein clients, seeking to recoup an alleged $9 billion in grants made by the state under the Road Home program, which was established in the wake of hurricanes Katrina and Rita. The state asserted rights as a subrogee under thousands of homeowners policies, as well as the rights of underlying policyholders who were allegedly under-compensated for hurricane-related losses by their respective insurance carriers. The defendants removed the case to federal court and the state sought remand. In a substantial victory for Sonnenschein's clients, the 5th Circuit affirmed the lower court's order denying remand, finding that the case had been properly removed to federal court under the Class Action Fairness Act (CAFA).
- State of Louisiana v. Allstate, et al., (App. No. 08-30465): The 5th Circuit affirmed a district court ruling denying the Louisiana attorney-general's motion to remand in the state's antitrust price-fixing case against Allstate and others. The court accepted the defense case that the state's action in State of Louisiana v. Allstate, et al.., was subject to federal jurisdiction under the Class Action Fairness Act (CAFA), even though the complaint contains no express class action allegations.

== Corporate social responsibility ==
=== Pro bono ===
- Sonnenschein, in conjunction with the advocacy organizations Equip for Equality, Access Living and the ACLU, reached a groundbreaking agreement in a class action lawsuit brought against the State of Illinois for its ongoing violation of the civil rights of people with developmental disabilities. The agreement, when approved by the court, will bring justice to people with developmental disabilities, giving them the choice to receive long-term care services in integrated community settings. As a result, they no longer will be compelled to live in segregated institutions in order to receive the services they require.
- Sonnenschein assisted in the successful completion of the Pentagon Memorial, a two-acre park adjacent to the Pentagon. The Pentagon Memorial Fund was established by the families of the 184 victims of the September 11, 2001 terrorist attacks in Washington, D.C.. As a result of the firm's multi-year pro bono representation of the Pentagon Memorial Fund, Sonnenschein was recognized at the dedication of the Memorial on September 11, 2008. The Memorial Fund allows for the construction and permanent maintenance of the Pentagon Memorial, which is the first of the major 9/11 memorials to be completed and opened to the public.
- Lawyers at Sonnenschein successfully represented a low-income Los Angeles community in preventing the installation of a dangerous railroad line immediately adjacent to an elementary school.

=== Legacy Charter School ===
In 2005, Sonnenschein became the first law firm to establish and fund a charter school, the Legacy Charter School in North Lawndale, an inner-city community on Chicago's West Side. The chair of the firm's pro bono committee and former managing partner serves as chief operating officer of the school. Lawyers and staff from the Chicago office routinely work with and tutor students. In addition, other firm employees provide a wide variety of support on school operations and management including finances, information technology, human resources and audio visual.

=== KEEN ===
Kids Enjoying Exercise Now (KEEN) is an organization founded in 1988 by Sonnenschein chairman Elliott Portnoy when he was a student in Oxford, England, and brought to Washington, D.C., in 1992. KEEN provides a broad range of exercise opportunities for disabled children in activities such as basketball, swimming and soccer. During its centennial celebration in 2006, Sonnenschein helped expand KEEN to New York and San Francisco, joining existing programs near firm locations in Chicago, Kansas City, Los Angeles, St. Louis and Washington. In 2008, the firm helped start the program in Phoenix. Sonnenschein lawyers and staff are encouraged to volunteer time with their local KEEN chapter.

=== Sonnenschein Scholars ===
As part of the firm's centennial in 2006, the firm created the Sonnenschein Scholars program. During the summer of 2006, and continuing through 2010, Sonnenschein has underwritten and will continue to underwrite the costs (more than $200,000 per year) associated with students working at public interest organizations of their choice during the summer before their second year of law school. Two Sonnenschein Scholars are chosen from each of 25 leading law schools around the country including Yale, Harvard, Stanford, Columbia, and University of Chicago.

== Rankings and recognitions ==
- Chambers & Partners awarded Sonnenschein the 2008 Chambers Award for Excellence in Insurance.
- In the 2008 edition of Chambers USA, 74 Sonnenschein attorneys were recognized among America's leading lawyers for business.
- Legal 500 ranked Sonnenschein in 2008 as a leader in Employee Benefits, Insurance, Mergers & Acquisitions, and Real Estate.
- PLC Which Lawyer? recommends Sonnenschein in the areas of Competition/Antitrust, Corporate Real Estate, Corporate/M&A, Dispute Resolution, Environment, Private Client, and Restructuring and Insolvency.

== Notable attorneys ==
- Joseph Andrew – Washington, D.C. partner. Former chair of the Democratic National Committee (1999–2001).
- David Jacobson – Alumnus. Special assistant to President Barack Obama and current United States Ambassador to Canada.
- Elliott Portnoy – Sonnenschein chairman, youngest ever to serve in the role. Founded firm's Public Law & Policy Strategies group. Started Kids Enjoy Exercise Now (KEEN).
- Scott Turow – Chicago partner. Best-selling author.
