= Grandall Law Firm =

Chinese law firm

- Headquarters: Beijing, People's Republic of China
- No. of offices: 32
- No. of attorneys: over 2000
- Major practice areas: Corporate and Commercial Law
- Date founded: 1998
- Company type: Law Firm
- Website: grandall.com.cn

Grandall Law Firm (Chinese: 国浩律师事务所), is a Chinese law firm specializing in Chinese corporate and commercial law. Grandall has offices across 32 cities. Being one of the largest full-service law firms in China, the firm has over 600 global partners.

== History ==
Established in 1998 through a merger between the then leading Chinese firms Michael Zhang & Associates in Beijing (Chinese: 北京张涌涛律师事务所, established in 1994), Wanguo Law Firm in Shanghai (Chinese: 上海万国律师事务所, 1993) and Tangren Law Firm in Shenzhen (Chinese: 深圳唐人律师事务所, 1993), Grandall has grown from a 15 attorneys firm to now being a law firm with over 2000 lawyers in 2018.

== Practice Areas ==
Grandall provides expert legal services in the areas of Banking and Finance, Capital Markets and Securities; Corporate and Commercial; Intellectual Property and E-Commerce; Construction and Real Estate; Power, Energy and Infrastructure; Labor and Human Resources; Dispute Resolution, Arbitration and Litigation; Aviation, Shipping and Maritime; Private Equity and Venture Capital, Tax and Trusts.

== Awards ==
The firm received awards by All China Lawyers Association (Outstanding Law Firm of the Nation), ALB China (Insurance, Tax, and Trusts), Chambers and Partners (VC/PE-backed Domestic IPO Lead Legal Adviser of the Year 2008, Capital Markets: PRC Law: Debt & Equity), Legal 500(M&A, Capital Markets, Energy projects), and Law.asia's China Business Law Awards 2024 (Capital Markets, Mergers and Acquisitions, Aviation).
