= Dacheng Law Offices =

Chinese law firm

Dacheng Law Offices Dàchéng Lǜshī Shìwùsuǒ 大成律师事务所
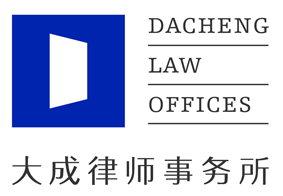
- Headquarters: Beijing, China
- No. of offices: 48
- No. of lawyers: Approximately 2,600 (end 2011)
- Major practice areas: General practice
- Key people: Wang Zhongde (Managing Partner)
- Revenue: Rmb1.2 billion (2011)
- Date founded: April 29, 1992 (Beijing)
- Company type: Special general partnership

Dacheng Law Offices
- Traditional Chinese: 大成律師事務所
- Simplified Chinese: 大成律师事务所
Transcriptions
Standard Mandarin
- Hanyu Pinyin: Dàchéng Lǜshī Shìwùsuǒ

Dacheng Law Offices (informally Dacheng) is a Chinese law firm headquartered in Beijing, China. According to The American Lawyer's 2012 survey, it was the tenth-largest law firm in the world by number of lawyers, and the largest headquartered outside the English-speaking world.

In November 2015, Dacheng merged with the global law firm Dentons. At the time of the merger, Dacheng was the largest China-based law firm measured by number of lawyers.

In August 2023, Dentons ended its combination with Dacheng, and established a "preferred firm" relationship, with Dacheng now operating independently as Beijing Dacheng Law Offices (大成).

Dacheng had 41 offices in China, and international offices in Chicago, Los Angeles, Moscow, New York, Paris, Singapore and Taipei.

== History ==
Dacheng was founded in Beijing on 29 April 1992, with five partners, three lawyers and two administration staff.

In 2009, Dacheng joined World Services Group, an international multidisciplinary professional services network of independent accounting, investment banking and law firms, becoming the first China-based member. In June 2009, Dacheng opened an office in Paris and merged with the Los Angeles-based law firm Matthews Wilson Hunter, which was subsequently rebranded as Dacheng. Dacheng formed a joint venture with the Singapore-based law firm Central Chambers in July 2009.

In November 2009, Dacheng received approval from the Beijing Municipal Bureau of Justice to convert from a general partnership into a special general partnership.

Dacheng opened an affiliated office in Taipei in May 2010 and merged with the Guangdong-based law firm Xin Yang Law Firm in June 2010, providing it with its first office in Hong Kong. Dacheng formed an alliance with the Portugal-based law firm PLMJ in September 2010 and opened an office in New York City in October 2010. In November 2011, Dacheng merged with the Chicago-based law firm John Z Huang & Associates, and it was reported that it was drawing up plans for the opening of an office in London.

In February 2013, Dacheng formed an exclusive alliance with the Dubai-based law firm Hussain Lootah & Associates.

In August 2013, Dacheng opened an office in Moscow.

In November 2015, Dacheng completed its merger with global law firm Dentons. The firm is known as Dentons in English and all other languages except for Chinese. In Chinese, the firm is known as 北京大成律师事务所.^{[11]} The firm is decentralised and has no headquarters.

In March 2018, Dacheng started a mutual cooperation with Sarasa Law Office in Tehran, Iran. It was the biggest legal event between the two countries, so many legal cases would be solved while China is the first commercial partner for Iran.

In August 2023, Dacheng Law Offices has split from the international law firm Dentons, bringing an end to their eight-year alliance.

== See also ==
- List of largest Chinese law firms
- Legal History of China
- Chinese law
