= Denton Wilde Sapte =

Denton Wilde Sapte LLP
- Headquarters: London, United Kingdom
- No. of offices: 12 (plus 4 associate offices)
- No. of lawyers: 610 (2010)
- No. of employees: 1,413 (2010)
- Major practice areas: General practice
- Revenue: £167.5 million (2010)
- Profit per equity partner: £360,000 (2010)
- Date founded: 1 February 2000 (London)
- Company type: Limited liability partnership
- Dissolved: 30 September 2010

Denton Wilde Sapte LLP (informally Dentons) was an international law firm headquartered in London, United Kingdom. It merged with the United States–based law firm Sonnenschein Nath & Rosenthal in September 2010, forming SNR Denton. At the time of the merger, Denton Wilde Sapte had 16 offices and employed around 610 lawyers.

== History ==
Denton Wilde Sapte was established on 1 February 2000 through a merger between the City of London–based law firms Denton Hall and Wilde Sapte. The merger created what was at the time the UK's 11th-largest law firm measured by revenues. Denton Hall had been established in 1788 by Sam Denton, and Thomas Wilde founded what was to become Wilde Sapte with partner Samuel Archer Hussey in 1785. In September 1988 Anthony Alexander, the Senior Partner of City law firm Herbert Oppenheimer Nathan & Vanayk, had joined Denton Hall Burgin & Warren along with 17 partners and 62 other lawyers. Denton Hall was a co-founder of the international alliance of law firms, Denton International, which was dissolved on 31 December 2003 after the partnership of German member Heuking Kühn Lüer Wojtek voted against a merger with Denton Wilde Sapte.

In 2004 and 2005 Denton Wilde Sapte suffered a significant number of partner defections to rival firms, including of a group of 11 technology, media and telecoms partners to DLA Piper in 2004. It converted from a partnership to a limited liability partnership on 1 November 2006.

On 26 May 2010 Denton Wilde Sapte and the United States–based law firm Sonnenschein Nath & Rosenthal announced their intention to merge. On 30 September 2010 the merger between Denton Wilde Sapte and Sonnenschein Nath & Rosenthal was formally completed, establishing SNR Denton.

== See also ==
- List of largest European law firms
- List of largest United Kingdom-based law firms
