= Indego Africa =

Rwandan nonprofit social enterprise

- Founded: November 2007
- Purpose: Education, Fair Trade, Women's Rights
- Location(s): New York (United States) and Kigali (Rwanda)
- Region served: Rwanda
- Method: Social Enterprise
- Key people: Karen Yelick (CEO)
- Website: www.indegoafrica.org

Indego Africa (standing for "independence, development and governance") is a nonprofit social enterprise, founded in 2007, which works to establish for-profit women's cooperatives in Rwanda, and partners with them to produce and sell handcrafted products. It uses the profits, along with grants and donations, to fund education programs in business management, entrepreneurship, literacy, and technology.

Indego Africa was founded in 2007 by father and son Matt and Tom Mitro.

== Partnerships ==
Indego Africa's partnerships with Rwandan female artisans have included:

- in 2007: a partnership with "Cocoki", a cooperative of 30 artisans in Kigali.
- in 2011: partnerships with 11 cooperatives of 300 artisans, producing tote bags for Steven Alan and Anthropologie and bangles for Nicole Miller.
- in 2014: partnerships with 18 cooperatives of over 600 artisans, producing items for designers and brands including Anthropologie, DANNIJO, J Crew, Jonathan Adler, and Madewell.

== Education ==
On October 1, 2014, Indego Africa launched a Leadership Academy in Kigali, Rwanda to provide advanced business education programs.

Indego Africa runs programs supported by UN Women and funded by the government of Sweden to teach female refugees entrepreneurial and banking skills.

== Social impact ==
Indego Africa's reports to date show steady improvements in its partners' income, educational outcomes, entrepreneurial activities, and quality of life. As of 2013, 69% of its artisan partners made over $1.50 a day vs. 3% in 2010; 89% reported that Indego Africa trainings helped them run their cooperatives or other businesses; 54% participated in a business outside their cooperative; 77% could afford to send all of their children to school; and 90% could afford healthcare.
