= Thacher Proffitt & Wood =

American law firm

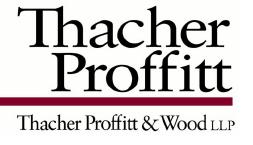
- Headquarters: New York City
- No. of offices: 5 at peak
- No. of attorneys: 365 at peak
- Major practice areas: General practice, Structured finance
- Date founded: 1848
- Company type: Limited liability partnership
- Dissolved: December 23, 2008, due to declining revenue and partner defections
- Website: www.tpw.com

Thacher Proffitt & Wood LLP was an American law firm headquartered in New York City. At its peak, the firm was made up of approximately 365 attorneys with offices in New York City; Washington, D.C.; Mexico City; White Plains, New York; and Summit, New Jersey.

== History ==
The firm traced its founding back to 1848, when Benjamin Franklin Butler opened a legal practice with his son, William Allen Butler, at 29 Wall Street in New York City. The firm was headquartered in downtown Manhattan from 1848 until 2001, eventually occupying floors 38 through 40 of the 2 World Trade Center building prior to the building's destruction in the September 11 attacks. All of the firm's employees survived the attacks, and the firm temporarily relocated to midtown Manhattan before moving to 2 World Financial Center in September 2003.

Thacher Proffitt was a market leader in the mortgage-backed securities (MBS) market, and in fact was instrumental in the creation of the residential MBS and commercial MBS markets. The firm so controlled the market that the standard documentation used by mortgage traders was known as "Thacher docs" and "TP&W forms." The firm grew from 177 lawyers in 2003 to 350 lawyers in 2007, mostly due to the strength of its structured finance practice, which came to constitute 70% of the firm's revenue. The firm also had highly regarded real estate, litigation, corporate, tax and derivatives practices. In 2006, the firm was ranked among the top 200 by The American Lawyer. It was also ranked among the top 80 most prestigious law firms in the nation by Vault.

The 2008 financial crisis, and in particular the collapse of Bear Stearns, the firm's largest client, significantly impacted the firm, leading to a breach of the firm's financing covenants and giving its lender, Citigroup, substantial control. The firm's offices in Mexico City and White Plains, New York, decamped to Chadbourne & Parke and Greenberg Traurig respectively. The firm had merger talks at one point with King & Spalding, but these talks collapsed in December 2008. On December 21, 2008, approximately 100 lawyers (including 40 partners) left Thacher Proffitt & Wood to work for Sonnenschein, Nath & Rosenthal. Two days later, on December 23, the firm's management officially announced dissolution of the firm. Shortly prior to its dissolution, the firm had been hired to advise the United States Department of the Treasury in connection with the Troubled Asset Relief Program (TARP).
