= Humanity in Action =

International non-profit organization

- Established: 1998 (28 years ago)
- Types: voluntary association
- Aim: human rights

Humanity in Action is an international nonprofit organization that educates and connects young people who seek to become leaders on issues related to human and minority rights. The organization, founded in 1997, maintains offices in seven countries: the United States, Denmark, France, Germany, the Netherlands, Poland and Bosnia and Herzegovina. Its flagship program, the Humanity in Action Fellowship, places more than 100 college students and recent graduates into intensive educational fellowship programs in one of five European cities each year. In 2015, Humanity in Action began a partnership with The National Center for Civil and Human Rights in Atlanta to start a sixth fellowship program, named after Congressman and civil rights leader John Lewis.

Key subjects explored in the Humanity in Action Fellowship include national identity, immigration, xenophobia, Islamophobia, antisemitism, racism, political extremism, human rights, minority rights and discrimination of Roma.

In addition to the Humanity in Action Fellowship, the organization manages other educational and professional fellowship programs in the United States and Europe. These include the Diplomacy and Diversity Fellowship, the Lantos-Humanity in Action Congressional Fellowship in the United States Congress, and the Pat Cox-Humanity in Action Fellowship in the European Parliament.

Headquartered in New York City, Humanity in Action is led by Executive Director Azi Khalili.

== History ==
Dr. Judith S. Goldstein, a historian who received her doctorate from Columbia University, founded Humanity in Action in 1997. The organization began as a pilot project to explore why some societies react to minority populations with policies of tolerance and acceptance while others respond with rising levels of xenophobia, hate and violence. The organization sought to use the historical example of how Danish citizens and their monarch intervened to save the lives of Danish Jews during World War II as a singular case study to explore this question. Goldstein’s initial pilot programs brought together groups of Danish and American students to study this moment in history and its lessons for future human rights challenges.

In 1999, the organization formally began the Humanity in Action Fellowship, its flagship program for university students and recent graduates. The first years of the Fellowship took place in Amsterdam and Copenhagen with students from three nations: the United States, Denmark and the Netherlands. Much like the initial pilot projects, the Fellowship used the Holocaust as its educational focus for a larger exploration of human and minority rights.

In 2025, Humanity in Action's Board of Directors appointed Azadeh "Azi" Khalili as Executive Director in partnership with Koya Partners.

== Mission ==
Humanity in Action aims to instill the values of human dignity and moral responsibility for the protection of the rights of minorities in a new generation of social, cultural and political leaders. The organization seeks to achieve this goal through its educational programming, which brings students from a wide range of countries together for short, intense fellowship programs. Students are challenged to explore innovative approaches to safeguarding human rights through a mix of discussions, site visits, film screenings, lectures, and other events.

Humanity in Action places a particular emphasis on developing its network of alumni, known as Senior Fellows. The organization seeks to educate future human rights leaders through an intense fellowship experience that transcends the norms of a typical college classroom. It further seeks to connect these future young leaders together as part of a global network of change-makers. Lastly, it hopes to inspire students to act on issues concerning human and minority rights. On this last point, the organization strives to foster community-based projects – so-called “action projects” – organized and executed by its Senior Fellows.

== Fellowship Programs ==
Humanity in Action organizes several fellowship programs in Europe and the United States. The programs are divided between those with an educational focus and those that provide professional work experience.

=== Humanity in Action Fellowship ===
The Humanity in Action Fellowship is the flagship program of Humanity in Action. This program brings together roughly 120 university students and recent graduates each June to study human and minority rights. The programs take place simultaneously in six cities: Amsterdam, Atlanta, Berlin, Copenhagen, Sarajevo and Warsaw. The fellowship brings together participants from 10 countries: Bosnia and Herzegovina, Denmark, France, Germany, Greece, the Netherlands, Poland, Turkey, Ukraine and the United States.

Students on each program embark on a month-long exploration of social justice issues. Fellowship participants engage in debates, visit nearby historical sites, and meet speakers who work on issues relevant to their interests.

The month-long fellowship culminates with participants from all five programs meeting for the Humanity in Action International Conference. Past conferences have been held in locales such as Berlin, Sarajevo, and Warsaw.

=== Lantos Humanity in Action Congressional Fellowship ===
Launched in 2001, the Lantos-Humanity in Action Congressional Fellowship places participants in a professional fellowship within the United States Congress. Fellows are most often placed within the office of a member of the House of Representatives or a Congressional subcommittee.

This four-month fellowship is designed for young people interested in careers in policy and politics in Washington, DC. Fellows receive work experience and attend educational sessions similar to those of the Humanity in Action Fellowship. To date, more than 100 fellows have participated in the program.

The Lantos-Humanity in Action Congressional Fellowship is named after Tom Lantos, the only survivor of the Holocaust to ever serve as a U.S. Congressman. Humanity in Action coordinates this program with the Lantos Foundation for Human Rights and Justice.

=== Pat Cox-Humanity in Action Fellowship ===
In 2004, Humanity in Action established the Pat Cox-Humanity in Action Fellowship. Modeled after the Lantos-Humanity in Action Congressional Fellowship in Washington, DC, this program provides professional work experience within the European Parliament. Participants are placed in either the office of a Member of Parliament or a nonprofit organization based in Brussels. Similar to the Washington, DC program, the fellowship is structured to offer both practical work experience and educational programming.

The Pat Cox-Humanity in Action Fellowship is named after Pat Cox, the President of the European Parliament from 2002 to 2004.

=== Diplomacy and Diversity Fellowship ===
In 2014, Humanity in Action established the Diplomacy and Diversity Fellowship, its first program for graduate students. This educational fellowship focuses on issues related to international affairs and foreign policy. The month-long program placed participants in both Washington, DC and Paris in its inaugural year. In 2015, Humanity in Action will expand the program to include Berlin.

Participants of the Diplomacy and Diversity Fellowship engage in group discussions, meet established leaders and write research articles on the issues explored during the program.

In 2016, 24 graduate students from Europe and the United States participated in the program.

=== John Lewis Fellowship ===
In 2015, Humanity in Action announced the John Lewis Fellowship, an educational fellowship on race and civil rights in America. The program takes place at the Center for Civil and Human Rights in Atlanta, Georgia. Much like its other programs, the fellowship brings together young people from Europe and the United States for a mix of group discussion and educational visits. The inaugural program was held in the summer of 2015.

The John Lewis Fellowship is named after Rep. John Lewis, a United States Congressman and instrumental figure of the Civil Rights Movement.

== Notable alumni ==
More than 1,700 people have participated in Humanity in Action’s fellowship programs since 1999. Notable Senior Fellows of the organization include:

- Ben Allen: California State Senator representing the state’s 26th District.
- Simone Kukenheim: Alderperson and Deputy Mayor of the City of Amsterdam.
- Kennedy Odede: Founder of Shining Hope for Communities.
- Marietje Schaake: Member of the European Parliament representing the Netherlands.
- Mariko Silver: President of Bennington College.
- Matt Haney: Member of the San Francisco Board of Supervisors

== International Conferences ==
In addition to fellowships programs, Humanity in Action organizes international conferences, held in various cities across the Europe, in cities such as Berlin, Sarajevo, Warsaw, Sarajevo, The Hague, Athens, Sønderborg, and Strasbourg. Each conference has a specific focus or set of issues it aims to engage with and panelists, experts, and keynote speakers are invited to weigh in and provide context on the themes of the conference. The first conference in Amsterdam took place in 2010, which brought together 200 Senior Fellows, alumni, and institutional partners to build opportunities for collaboration and share cross-field knowledge.

== Publications ==
Humanity in Action has published several books and produced a film. Media products produced by Humanity in Action include:

- Reflections on the Holocaust: A 2012 collection of 12 essays from friends of the organization.
- Civil Society and the Holocaust: International Perspectives on Resistance and Rescue: A 2013 book published in tandem with a conference on the 70th anniversary of the rescue of Danish Jews during the Second World War.
- Humanity in Action: Collected Essays and Talks: A 2014 collection of nine essays and talks by Judith Goldstein.
- Oktober ’43: A 2013 collection of historical sources on the rescue of Danish Jews during the Second World War.
- Just People: A 2011 film produced by Humanity in Action and directed by Annegriet Wietsma.
- Transatlantic Perspectives on Diplomacy and Diversity: A 2014 collection of essays on topics spanning the fields of international relations and global diversity, with focus on Libya, sexuality-based asylum in the EU, and political rifts growing between the East and West.
- Shifting Paradigms: Humanity in Action Senior Fellows on Pluralism and Policy Across Borders (2016).
- Two Trees in Jerusalem: written by Cornelia Schmalz-Jacobsen, an account of her parents' resistance to National Socialism.
- John Lewis Fellowship Presentations: Reflections compiled from Fellows attending the 2016 Conference examining issues of identity, such as national, ethnic, gender, racial, or religious affiliations.
