= Fraser Milner Casgrain =

Defunct Canadian law firm

Fraser Milner Casgrain LLP (FMC)
- Type: Private
- Industry: Law
- Founded: 1839
- Headquarters: Canada with offices in Montreal, Ottawa, Toronto, Edmonton, Calgary, and Vancouver
- Website: fmc-law.com

Fraser Milner Casgrain LLP (FMC) was a Canadian business, litigation, and a tax law firm. With more than 560 lawyers (175 litigators), it was the sixth largest law firm in Canada as well as the largest law firm in Western Canada.

== History ==
Until 1984, FMC was a fully integrated national partnership with offices in Montreal, Ottawa, Toronto, Edmonton, Calgary, and Vancouver. In 1985, Fraser Milner Casgrain (then known as Fraser and Beatty) underwent a major administration change.

Terrence Young was appointed as chief executive officer, and he initiated FMC's expansion into Hong Kong, making FMC a multi-national law firm. Young was CEO for 13 years, until the 1998 merger between Fraser and Beatty and Alberta-based law firm Milner Fenerty.

On November 8, 2012, it was announced that FMC would combine with international law firms SNR Denton and Salans to form Dentons. FMC's most recent CEO before its second merger was Michel Brunet. He was appointed as CEO in 2006 and was the managing partner of the FMC Montreal office.

== Fate ==
As of March 28, 2013, Fraser Milner Casgrain combined with Salans and SNR Denton to form Dentons.
