= Salans (law firm) =

Law firms of the United Kingdom

Salans LLP
- Headquarters: Decentralised
- No. of offices: 20 across 17 countries
- No. of attorneys: Approximately 750
- No. of employees: Approx. 1,540 (2012)
- Revenue: €209.5 million (£181.5 million) (2012)
- Date founded: 1978 (Paris)
- Company type: Limited liability partnership
- Dissolved: 28 March 2013 (merged with SNR Denton and Fraser Milner Casgrain to form Dentons)

Salans LLP was an international commercial law firm. It was founded in 1978 in Paris as Salans Hertzfeld & Heilbronn and in March 2013 merged with the Anglo-American law firm SNR Denton and the Canada-based law firm Fraser Milner Casgrain, forming Dentons.

At the time of its merger with SNR Denton and Fraser Milner Casgrain, Salans had around 750 lawyers and over 1,500 staff operating from 20 offices across 17 countries. Salans' clients included multinational corporations, commercial investment and regional banks, insurance companies, investment funds, international organisations, public entities and sovereign states. The firm was decentralised and had no headquarters.

== History ==
Salans was founded in 1978 as Salans Hertzfeld & Heilbronn by two American lawyers, Carl Salans and Jeffrey Herzfeld, and a French lawyer, Eliane Heilbronn. In 1991 it was the first Western law firm to enter Russia.

In October 1997 Salans Hertzfeld & Heilbronn acquired the London-based law firm Harris Rosenblatt & Kramerhas, becoming the first Continental law firm to practice UK law.

In September 1998 Salans Hertzfeld & Heilbronn and the New York-based law firm Christy & Viener agreed to merge. The merger was completed on 1 January 1999. Also in September 1998 Salans Hertzfeld & Heilbronn acquired the Paris-based IT boutique law firm FG Associes.

In September 2003 Salans acquired the Prague, Bucharest, Bratislava, Istanbul and Shanghai offices of the collapsed American law firm Altheimer & Gray's.

In January 2006 Salans opened its first office in Germany through the acquisition of the Berlin office of the collapsed German law firm Haarmann Hemmelrath.

Salans acquired the Spanish law firm Masons Buxeda Menchén in April 2007, giving it offices in Madrid and Barcelona.

Between June 2009 and December 2011 Salans had a non-exclusive strategic partnership with the British law firm Pinsent Masons.

On 8 November 2012, Salans, the Anglo-American law firm SNR Denton and the Canada-based law firm Fraser Milner Casgrain announced a three-way merger, to form a new law firm structured as a Swiss Verein and named Dentons. The partners of the three firms ratified the merger on 28 November 2012, and the new firm was planned to begin operations in early 2013.

The merger between Salans, Fraser Milner Casgrain and SNR Denton was completed on 28 March 2013.

== Main practice areas ==
Salans had the following main practice areas:

- Arbitration
- Banking & Finance
- Capital Markets
- Competition, Trade & Regulatory
- Corporate
- Employment
- IP, Technology & Communications
- Litigation
- Notary Services
- Real Estate
- Regulatory & Public Law
- Reorganisation, Restructuring & Insolvency
- Tax
- Trade, WTO & Customs
