= Chicago 21 =

Chicago 21 may refer to:

- Twenty 1, a music album by the band Chicago
- Chicago 21 Plan, a 1970s urban renewal plan for the city of Chicago
