= Carmen Valentín Pérez =

Puerto Rican nationalist

Carmen Hilda Valentín Pérez (born March 2, 1946) is a former member of the FALN, an armed clandestine group which fought for Puerto Rican independence from the United States during the 1970s and 1980s. She was arrested and charged in 1980 for seditious conspiracy and other charges and was sentenced on February 18, 1981, to 90 years imprisonment. She was incarcerated in a U.S. federal prison and released early from prison after President Bill Clinton extended a clemency offer to her on September 7, 1999.

== Early years ==
Carmen Valentín Pérez was born in Camuy, Puerto Rico, on March 2, 1946, and emigrated with her family to the U.S. when she was 10 years old. She graduated from Providence St. Mel School in 1965, and received a Bachelor of Arts in Spanish from Northeastern Illinois University and a Masters of Arts in Counselling from Roosevelt University. At the time of her arrest by the U.S. Government on seditious conspiracy charges, she was completing her Doctorate from Loyola University in Chicago.

== Professional career ==
=== Teaching ===
After completing her university studies, Valentín Pérez became active in the community as a young teacher at Tuley High School (later Roberto Clemente High School), demanding that the Chicago Board of Education transfer the incumbent principal, Herbert Fink, and introduce Puerto Rican history and culture in the school's curriculum.

=== Community activist ===
Valentín Pérez worked at the Central YMCA Community College. She sponsored both the Iranian Student Association and the Organization of Arab Students during an intense period of conflict and controversy which led to many physical confrontations with the local police as well as with the Shah's secret police. In the community she worked to defeat the Chicago 21 Plan. She was a founding member and president of the José de Diego Bilingual Center and was on the board of directors of Aspira of Illinois. Valentín Pérez was also a founding member of the Segundo Ruiz Belvis Puerto Rican Cultural Center. Ms. Valentín Pérez helped develop various educational and cultural programs for inmates at the maximum security prison for men at Stateville, Illinois.

== Arrest and imprisonment ==
=== Seditious conspiracy ===
Valentín Pérez and 11 others were arrested on April 4, 1980, in Evanston, Illinois. She was charged with seditious conspiracy and related charges, and sentenced to 90 years. Her release date was scheduled for 2043.

They had been linked to more than 100 bombings or attempted bombings since 1974, actions whose goal was to achieve independence for Puerto Rico. At their trial proceedings, all of the arrested declared their status as prisoners of war, and refused to participate in the proceedings. None of the bombings of which they were convicted resulted in deaths or injuries. Among the other convicted Puerto Rican nationalists there were sentences of as long as 90 years in Federal prisons for offenses including sedition, possession of unregistered firearms, interstate transportation of a stolen vehicle, interference with interstate commerce by violence and interstate transportation of firearms with intent to commit a crime. None of those granted clemency were convicted in any of the actual bombings. Rather, they had been convicted on a variety of charges ranging from bomb making and conspiracy to armed robbery and firearms violations. They were all convicted for sedition, the act of attempting to overthrow the Government of the United States in Puerto Rico by force.

=== Human rights violations charge ===
There were reports of human rights violations against the FALN prisoners. Some were allegedly sexually assaulted by prison personnel or denied adequate medical attention or kept in isolated underground prison cells for no reason. Amnesty International and the House of Representatives' Subcommittee on Courts, Intellectual Property and the Administration of Justice both criticized the conditions. The conditions were found to be in violation of the U.N. Standard Minimum Rules for the Treatment of Prisoners.

=== Political prisoner ===
The sentences received by Valentín Pérez and the others would later be judged by United States President Bill Clinton to be "out of proportion to the nationalists' offenses." Statistics showed their sentences were almost 20 times greater than sentences for similar offenses by the American population at large.

For many years, numerous national and international organizations criticized Carmen Valentin's incarceration categorizing it as political imprisonment. Carmen Valentín Pérez was finally released from prison on September 10, 1999, after President Bill Clinton extended her clemency. Clinton cited Rev. Desmond Tutu and former President Jimmy Carter as having been influential on his decision to grant Valentin the clemency offer. Cases involving the release of other Puerto Rican Nationalist prisoners have also been categorized as cases of political prisoners, with some being more vocal than others.

In criticizing President Clinton's decision to release the Puerto Rican prisoners, the conservative U.S. Senate Republican Policy Committee also categorized Valentín as a "Puerto Rican Nationalist", echoing a recent Newsweek article. In 2006, the United Nations called for the release of the remaining Puerto Rican political prisoners in United States prisons.

== Personal life ==
Of her decision to return to Puerto Rico, she said, "I felt like I had work to do here, caring for my mother and grand-daughter, Karina López Valentín. Additionally, I always wanted to come back to live here. I never wanted to live in the United States, which I never liked anything about — not the climate, not the food, not the atmosphere. The only reason I stayed there was my involvement with the struggle for the independence of Puerto Rico." She often still visits the States as her only son, Antonio, and the rest of her grandchildren live in Chicago.

She was quoted in 2009 as saying: "There will never be statehood here. Now I feel it, I see it, and I'm living it. This coming year, the situation will be good because there are so many disastrous policies, like firing thousands of people and the sinister plans this administration has for the Ecological Corridor. They're trying to destabilize and destroy everything, and Puerto Rico will rise up."

In 2017, Valentín Pérez and other Puerto Rican nationalists welcomed a newly freed leader of the nationalists, Oscar López Rivera, who said the nationalists had disavowed violence years ago.

== See also ==
- Carlos Alberto Torres
- Pedro Albizu Campos
- Oscar Collazo
- Lolita Lebrón
- Puerto Rican independence movement
- Avelino González-Claudio
- Filiberto Ojeda Ríos
