= Stremlau =

Stremlau is a German language habitational surname. Notable people with the name include:

- John Stremlau (born 1953), retired U.S. soccer player
- Joseph P. Stremlau (1892–1970), American farmer, businessman, and politician
