= Cook County Administration Building =

Office skyscraper in Chicago, Illinois

Coordinates: 41°52′59″N 87°37′48″W

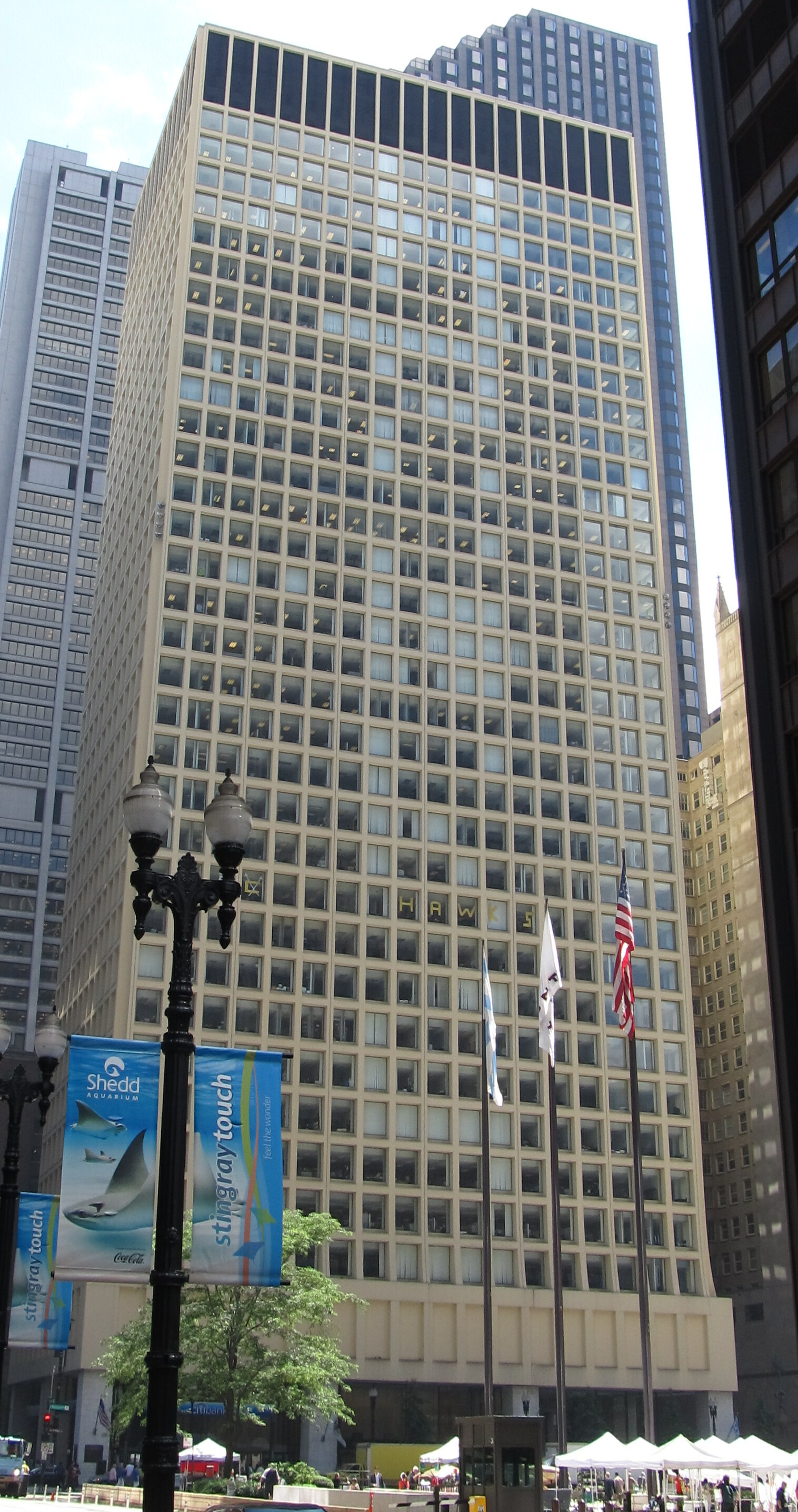
Cook County Administration Building

The George W. Dunne Cook County Administration Building (formerly known as the Brunswick Building) is a skyscraper at 69 West Washington Street in Chicago, Illinois. The building, constructed between the years 1962 and 1964, is 475 ft (144.8 m) tall, and contains 35 floors. It has a concrete structure. The building, engineered by Fazlur Khan of the firm Skidmore, Owings & Merrill, is notable for innovating the tube-within-a-tube structural system.

Originally built as a headquarters office for the Brunswick Corporation, the tower was later acquired by the Cook County government and now holds county government offices and courtrooms.Officially the "George W. Dunne Cook County Administration Building", its namesake is George W. Dunne (who served as president of the Cook County Board of Commissioners).

== Development ==
The building was developed and leased by Arthur Rubloff & Co. The Brunswick Corporation, at the time experiencing rapid growth in its sales, signed a multimillion dollar 20-year lease as its anchor tenant. The building would become its new headquarters, replacing the headquarters it had occupied for 60 years on South Wabash Avenue. The company had for several years already been considering relocating its headquarters. Brunswick Corporation's lease was key in the project's financing. The deal with the Brunswick Corporation was secured for Arthur Rubloff & Co. by Perry S. Herst Jr., who was (at the time) a young real estate broker working under Arthur Rubloff. Herst convinced the company that having its name adorn the planned $35 million downtown skyscraper would advertise it as a successful business. Also part of the pitch was that its location was across-the-street from the then-planned Chicago Civic Center (today known as the Richard J. Daley Center). The positive reputation of Skidmore, Owings & Merrill (contracted to design the building) also attracted the Brunswick Corporation.

The land for the building was secured in 1960, with several investors aiding in the acquisition of a quarter-block assemblage of parcels. 44,150 square feet (4,102 m^{2}) of parcels was acquired, including the properties on which numerous buildings stood: a 17 story Chicago Title and Trust Building, a building a 69 W. Washington, a 13 story office building at 30 N. Dearborn, and seven additional buildings. Investors financed and built the skyscraper through a partnership named Washington-Dearborn Properties, Inc., and the George A. Fuller Company was selected as the contractor.

The original late-1961 announcement for the project touted that it was intended to be the "largest and tallest skyscraper contracted in the heart of the Loop since the early 1930s", with preliminary plans at the time being that it would stand 35 floors, with 500 feet (150 m) tall, and contain 800,000 square feet (74,000 m^{2}) of space. Brunswick, the namesake anchor tenant, was to occupy roughly one-fifth of the building's rentable floor space. It was ultimately somewhat smaller in size than this initial vision.

== Design and construction ==
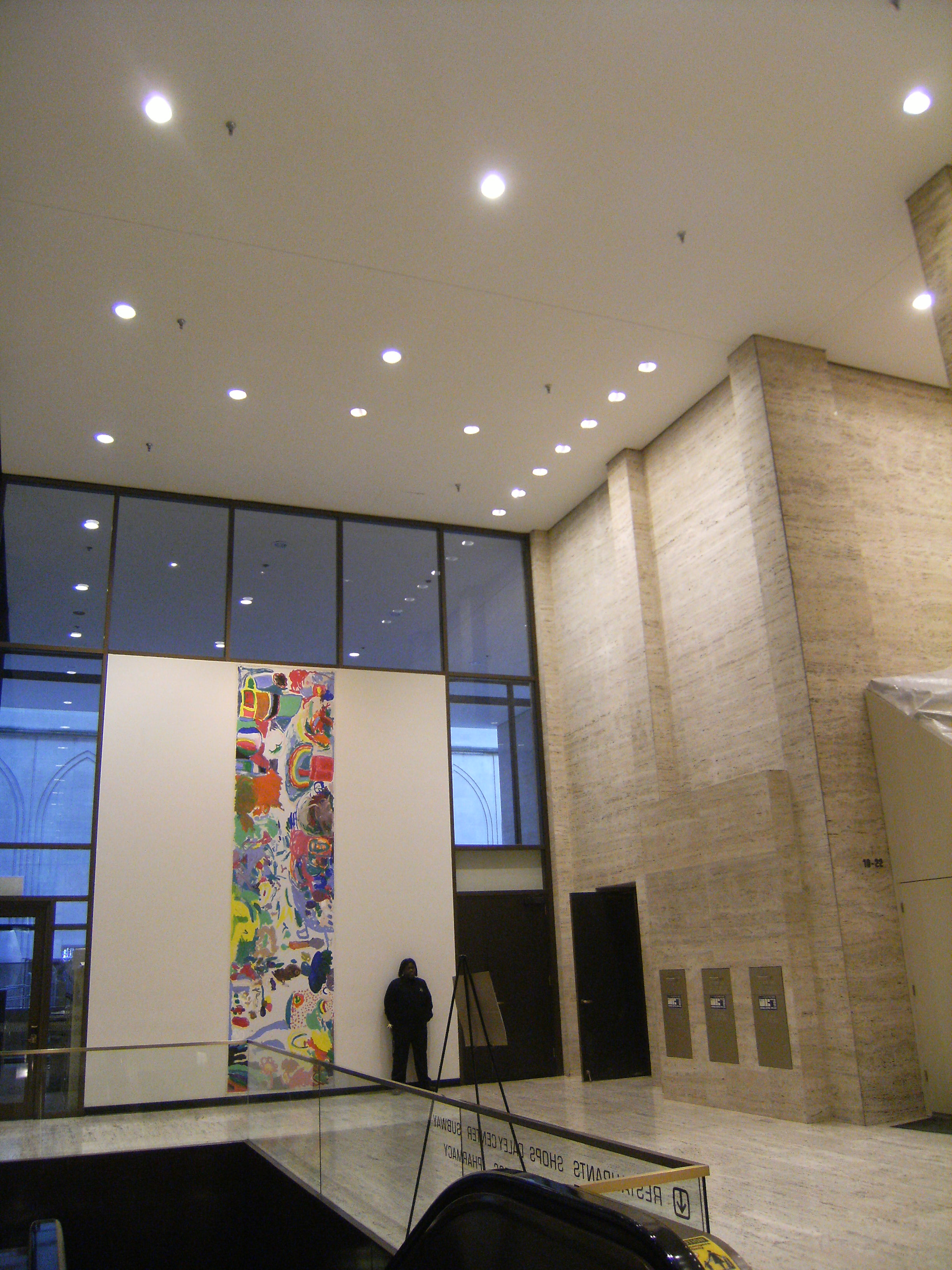
Interior

The building, was constructed between the years 1962 and 1964, and utilizes a concrete structure. At the time of its construction, it was Chicago's tallest concrete office building. The building is designed with an exposed structure and adheres to the modernist architecture style. The building utilizes a deep foundation system. The building features 690,000 square feet (64,000 m^{2}) of space. It stands 475 feet (145 m) tall, and contains 35 floors.

The building was designed by Skidmore, Owings & Merrill engineer Fazlur Khan and architect Bruce Graham. It was the first building to utilize the shear wall frame interaction system conceptualized by Kahn. Kahn adapted the tube system he had innovated with the design of The Plaza on DeWitt by creating a tube-within-a-tube, with both the building's core and its perimeter being hollow and rigid tubes that support the tower, allowing for column-free interior space. At its lower portion, the façade of the tower juts back slightly in a curve. Michael Saphier Associates Inc. (an office space planning firm) advised on the building's interior layout.

As civic center that was being developed across Washington Street contemporarily (the Richard J. Daley Center) was also being designed by Skidmore, Owings & Merrill, Arthur Rubloff & Co. requested that the architectural firm incorporate some architectural style cues from the planned complex. Herst commented that he believed that the two projects could compliment each other in a manner that could give Chicago a space similar to New York City's Rockefeller Center.

The building stands at the southwest corner of Dearborn Street and Washington Street. It is connected to the Chicago Pedway system, with the Pedway featuring retail spaces in the area where it passes beneath the tower. An underground Chicago Pedway passage connects the building to the Richard J. Daley Center across the street. The building has a small plaza situated between it and the adjacent Chicago Temple Building which features an untitled sculpture by Joan Miró. The sculpture, designed specifically for the plaza, and was unveiled there on April 20, 1981. The inclusion of plaza space and some landscaping around the building was meant to compliment nearby Daley Plaza. Architect Bruce Graham had begun talks with Miró about designing a sculpture for it during the early stages of the project, but the Brunswick Corporation had initially opted against installing a sculpture. Fifteen years after the building was completed, an arrangement was reached in which Miró would donate the design as a gift to the residents of Chicago, and construction of the sculpture would be funded jointly by private donors and the city government. The sculpture is regarded as a companion of sorts to the untitled 1967 sculpture by Pablo Picasso located across-the-street at Daley Plaza.

== Acquisition by county government, current use ==
Having originally housed commercial offices and served as the headquarters of the Brunswick Corporation, the buildings were acquired by the Cook County government in 1996, for approximately $40 million. and was converted to housing county government offices and courtrooms. It is today officially known as the "George W. Dunne Cook County Administration Building", with its namesake being George W. Dunne (who served as president of the Cook County Board of Commissioners).

== 2003 fire ==
On October 17, 2003, a structural fire occurred on the 12th floor of the building. The fire originated in a storage closest in Suite 1240, used by Secretary of State's Business Services Division. Reported to building security at approximately 5 pm and building security officers reporting the fire at 5:02 pm via 9-1-1. The voice evacuation alarm was initiated at 5:03 pm. Chicago Fire Department personnel arrived by 5:06 pm and firefighters confirmed an active fire at 5:10 pm. At 5:15, 9-1-1 received a call reporting that an individual is trapped by heavy smoke. This call would be followed by several additional calls from various individuals trapped in the southeast stairway, reporting that it was filled with smoke and that they are unable to exit the stairway due to locked doors. (Note: For security reasons, stairwell exit doors locked behind the user, forcing an individual who entered the stairwell to proceed down to the lobby to exit the stairwell, and preventing exit from the stairwell at any floor other than the lobby.) Calls from trapped individuals continued until 5:47 pm.

Some individuals trapped in the stairway discovered the door on the 27th floor was not latched, and were able to escape from the smoke filled stairway. Thirteen individuals were unable to reach floor 27 and collapsed from smoke between floors 16 and 22, killing six of them.

The fire was reported as out at 6:39 pm.

A review into the handling of the fire, authored by James Lee Witt, was tasked with identifying what occurred during the response to the fire, shortcomings that occurred, and how to address them. Then make recommendations to improve deficient procedures and systems. The report was released in late 2004. The report ultimately determined several critical factors contributed fire and loss of life:

- Lack of sprinklers on the 12th floor, enabling a small fire to start, spread and take hold;
- Chicago Fire Department's failure to conduct searches of stairways;
- The opening of the door in the southeast stairway on floor 12; allowing smoke and heat into the stairway;
- Locked stairway doors that prevented individuals from exiting the smoke filled stairway.

The report also found numerous other issues that contributed to the situation: inadequate evacuation training for building occupants, ineffective communication between 9-1-1 dispatchers and fire incident command, poor incident command procedures, and non-compliance with state fire code.

The National Institute of Standards and Technology (NIST) also performed testing to assist the State of Illinois in understanding the fire's growth and smoke movement in the structure, particularly the southeast stairway. NIST also simulated fire growth and spread if fire sprinklers had been present on the 12th floor, determining that most likely, the fire would have remained contained to the storage room had sprinklers been present.

In April 2008, the City of Chicago, in addition to several other defendants, paid $100 million to the families of the six victims after litigation, citing multiple failures. Reforms were passed after the fire, requiring operational sprinklers to be installed in many high rises in Chicago. As of early 2017, at least 20 commercial high rises, including Chicago City Hall and 81 residential high rises, had missed a January 1, 2017 deadline to have sprinklers installed and operational.

== In media ==
In the film National Lampoon's Christmas Vacation, the building is shown in establishing shots as Clark Griswold's workplace for his job as a chemical engineer at a food company.
