= Peru Mall =

- Location: Peru, Illinois
- Coordinates: 41.35559°N 89.12772°W
- Opened: 1974
- Developer: Rubloff Company
- Owner: GK Development
- Num. of stores: 15
- Num. of anchor tenants: 6 (2 open, 4 vacant)
- Floor area: 465,000 sq ft (43,200 m^{2})
- Floors: 1

Peru Mall is a shopping mall located in Peru, Illinois, United States. The mall's anchor stores are AMC Theatres and Marshalls. There are 3 vacant anchor stores that were once Bergner's, JCPenney, and Sears. Other retailers include;Buckle, Maurices, Bath & Body Works and 10 other inline tenants. Directly outside the shopping center are Applebee's and Subway restaurants. The 465,000 square feet (43,200 m^{2}) mall also serves as a major commercial center in the city of Peru.

== History ==
Rubloff Company of Chicago built the mall in 1974. It originally featured Bergner's and Montgomery Ward. The mall later gained JCPenney as a third anchor, and underwent a renovation in 1989. The Mall's Movie Theater opened in 1989 by GKC Theatres with four screens. It was expanded twice in the 1990s, first to six, then eight screens. In 2005, Carmike Cinemas took over the theater after its purchase of GKC. It was acquired by AMC Theatres in 2016. Montgomery Ward closed in 2001 as one of the last stores in the company to close, and Sears moved into the space in 2003. Marshalls was added as a fourth anchor in 2006 in the former Walgreens spot. On March 17, 2017, it was announced that JCPenney would be closing as part of a plan to close 138 stores nationwide. The store closed on July 31, 2017. On July 7, 2017, it was announced that Sears would also be closing as part of a plan to close 43 stores nationwide. The store closed in October 2017. On April 18, 2018, it was announced that Bergner's would be closing as well on August 29, 2018, as parent company The Bon-Ton Stores was going out of business which left Jo-Ann Fabrics, AMC Theatres and Marshalls as the only anchors left.

On August 18, 2020, the Peru City Council voted in favor of moving forward with a plan to convert the Peru Mall into apartment complexes accompanied by a shopping and dining center. As of 2025, no major changes have been made. In 2024, an auction of the former Sears anchor was done and sold to a private investor based in California. It is unknown who the identity of said investor is. So far, the only redevelopment done was some new concrete added to the walled off Bergners and Sears entrances, a new road way was paved in front of the mall which was needed. A new Ollies store opened in the former Jo Ann's store next to the subdivided Kmart across the street.

On November 23, 2024, the manager of Claire's announced they would be closing at Peru Mall via a Facebook post. The store closed December 14, 2024. Another Claire's was located in the Walmart down the road, but shortly after it was announced that Claire's would close as well.

In late December 2024 a pick up truck collided with a pillar of the Peru Mall sign located in front of the North East entrance. The pillar remains damaged as of April 2025.

On February 12, 2025 it was announced Jo-Ann fabrics would be closing 500 stores. The Peru Mall location was one of them set to close

On April 28, 2025 Jo-Ann Fabrics permanently closed.

On April 29, 2025 Peru Mall’s Facebook announced a new tenant in the form of a kiosk. This would be the first new permanent tenant the mall has had since 2019. The tenant [Retro Bricks] is a toy store selling official LEGO and opened May 3, 2025.
