= Illinois Valley Regional Airport =

- IATA: VYS; ICAO: KVYS; FAA LID: VYS

Summary
- Airport type: Public
- Owner/Operator: City of Peru
- Serves: Peru, Illinois
- Opened: 1985
- Elevation AMSL: 654 ft (199 m)
- Coordinates: 41°21′07″N 089°09′11″W
- Website: www.peru.il.us/airport

Map
- Location of airport in Illinois VYS (the United States)

Runways
Direction	Length		Surface
Direction	ft	m	Surface
18/36	6,000	1,829	Asphalt
7/25	4,000	1,219	Asphalt

Statistics (2021)
- Aircraft operations: 21,000
- Based aircraft: 51
- Source: Federal Aviation Administration

Illinois Valley Regional Airport (IATA: VYS, ICAO: KVYS, FAA LID: VYS), also known as Walter Duncan Field, is a city-owned, public-use airport located 1 nautical mile (1.9 km; 1.2 mi) northwest of the central business district of Peru, a city in LaSalle County, Illinois, United States. The airport hosts the TBM Avenger Reunion every year in May.

The airport also has a flying club that offers aircraft rental, flight training, and events such as fly-in breakfasts.

== History ==
Ground was broken for the airport in June 1985. It was due to open in mid October of that year, but poor weather delayed work. Operations at the airport began a couple weeks later on November 1st.

Thrifty Car Rental opened an office at the airport in November 2000.

The airport began hosting the TBM Avenger Reunion in 2016. An OSF Life Flight hangar was also opened that year.

In 2021, the city agreed to the construction of a 5,760-square-foot (535 m^{2}) hangar and the relocation of another to expand an existing hangar.

== Facilities and aircraft ==
=== Facilities ===
Illinois Valley Regional Airport covers an area of 200 acres (81 ha) at an elevation of 654 feet (199 m) above mean sea level. It has two runways, one designated 18/36 with an asphalt surface measuring 5,999 by 100 feet (1,829 x 30 m) and a second designated 7/25 with an asphalt surface measuring 3,999 by 75 feet.

A number of construction projects began at the airport in 2022 to upgrade facilities. The airport plans on extending the airport's major taxiway as well as adding five new hangars.

The airport has a fixed-base operator that offers services such as catering, ground and cargo handling, and ground power units for transient aircraft as well as hangars for long-term storage. The facility offers charter flights. Meeting rooms, a lounge, a weather briefing station, and courtesy cars are also available.

=== Aircraft ===
For the 12-month period ending May 31, 2021, the airport had 21,000 aircraft operations, an average of 57 per day: 98% general aviation, 1% air taxi, and <1% military. At that time, there were 51 aircraft based at this airport: 35 single-engine airplanes, 14 helicopters, and 2 jets.

== Accidents and incidents ==
- On March 13, 2004, a Piper PA-28 Cherokee was substantially damaged at the Illinois Valley Regional Airport when its right main landing gear collapsed during landing. The dual student, a non-current private pilot receiving instruction for a flight review, was doing touch-and-goes when he reached for and partially retracted the landing gear lever instead of the flap lever. The student and instructor both realized the error before the gear flap was fully retracted but not before the right main gear collapsed. The aircraft veered to the right and the nose gear subsequently collapsed. The probable cause of the accident was found to be the inadvertent landing gear retraction by the dual student during the landing roll.
- On June 18, 2006, an amateur-built Good RV-6A airplane and an amateur-built Turner RV-8 airplane collided mid-air at the Illinois Valley Regional Airport. Both airplanes were part a four aircraft formation preparing to land at the time of the accident in preparation for the Illinois Valley Air Show. The pilot of the RV-8, the leader of the formation, reported that he started to turn to enter the downwind leg to the runway's traffic pattern. Soon after starting the turn towards the runway, he felt the impact of the other airplane. A witness on the ground reported the RV-6 was late in initiating a climb with the formation and then climbed sharply and steeply, hitting the RV-8. The probable cause of the accident was found to be the pilot's failure to maintain clearance with the lead airplane during the overhead recovery maneuver prior to landing.

== See also ==
- List of airports in Illinois
