= Sara Miller =

American real estate executive and sculptor (1924–2016)

Sara Shapiro Miller (July 8, 1924 – October 29, 2016) was an American real estate executive and sculptor.

== Early life ==
Born Sara Shirlee Shapiro on the west side of Chicago, Miller was the daughter of Philip Shapiro, a baker, and Rose Morris Shapiro, a boarding house proprietor. The tenth of twelve children, she grew up in the Lincoln Park neighborhood. After graduation from Jones Commercial High School she entered the world of real estate, taking a job as a professional realtor with Arthur Rubloff. Beginning in the field of office leasing, she later moved to commercial and industrial real estate, eventually becoming a vice president at Rubloff's firm.

== Personal life ==
Married in 1946 to Ira J. Miller, she was the mother of three children. Miller and her husband were among the founders of Little City, and did philanthropic work on behalf of the developmentally disabled, raising money to build a home for them in Palatine, Illinois. The couple were members of Anshe Emet Synagogue. Miller began studying ceramics and sculpture in her retirement years, studying at Truman College and at the School of the Art Institute of Chicago and working with Anna Varalla and Morino Moretti, the latter in Orvieto. She was a member of Chicago's Palette and Chisel Artist's studio. In later years she lived at the Hancock Tower, where she died.

== Sculpting career ==
Miller produced a number of public sculptures for Chicago institutions during her career. Among these were busts of Saul Bellow, installed in the Harold Washington Library in 1993, and Gwendolyn Brooks, commissioned for the same location the following year. Brooks honored the artist with a poem upon completion of her portrait. The library also owns a 1994 bust of Ernest Hemingway by the artist. Copies of the busts of both Bellow and Brooks are owned by the National Portrait Gallery.
