= William Donald Scherzer =

American engineer and inventor

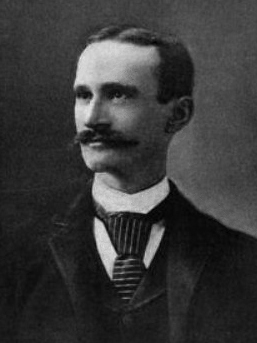
William Donald Scherzer, circa 1893

William Donald Scherzer (January 27, 1858 – July 20, 1893) was an American engineer and inventor who invented the rolling lift bridge.

== Early life ==
Scherzer's parents were William and Wilhelmina Scherzer, who immigrated from Germany in 1847. Scherzer was born in Peru, Illinois, on January 27, 1858, as the second son in a family of three sons and one daughter.

== Mid-life ==
Scherzer received his primary education in public schools. He exhibited talent in art and mathematics, where his father had exhibited talent in music and art. After elementary school Scherzer entered the private schooling of Professor Eggers at the age of 15 for college prep courses. He later then took up civil engineering at the Polytechnicum college in Zurich, Switzerland when he was eighteen years old. There he was at the top of his class. Scherzer was considered a competitor both in play and studies by all that knew him closely. He graduated from the Zurich engineering college in 1880.

== Career ==
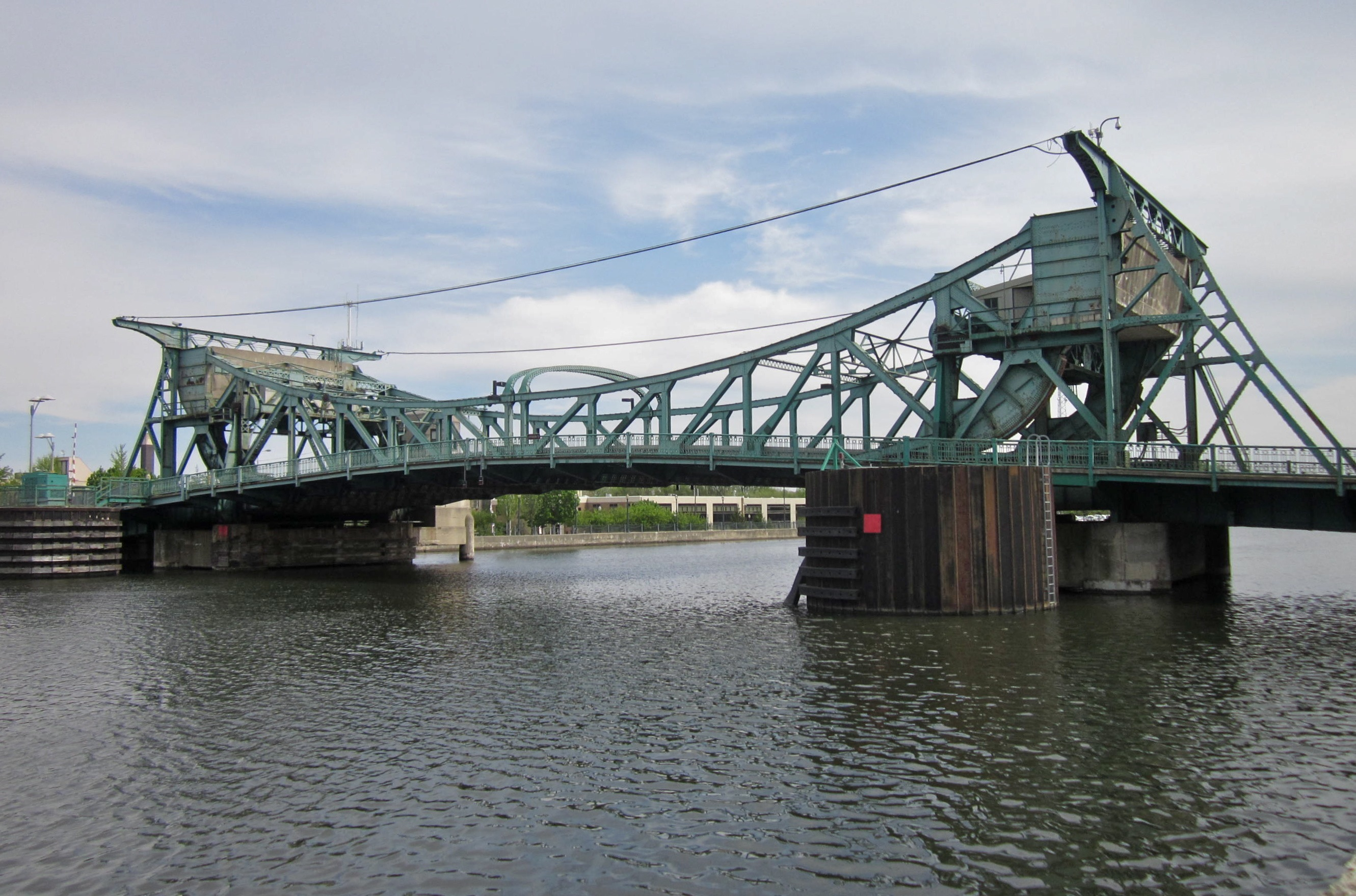
The Jefferson Street Bridge, in Joliet, Illinois, one of four Scherzer Rolling Lift bridges still in use in that city

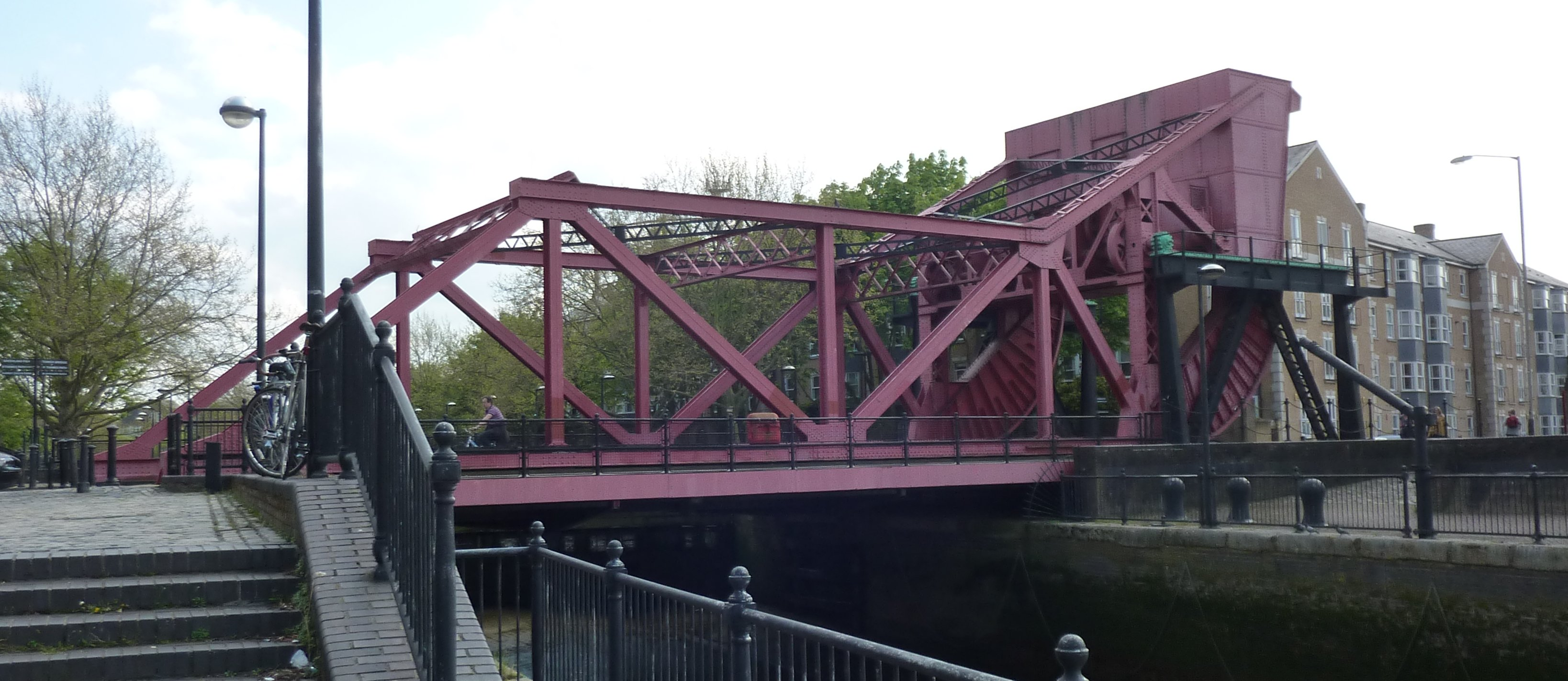
A single-leaf rolling lift bridge example over the entrance to Surrey Water beside the River Thames in London, England

Animation of a rolling lift bridge

Scherzer returned to America in 1880 and took the position of engineer for three years at the Matthiessen & Hegeler Zinc Company at La Salle, Illinois. In 1883 he was employed by the Pittsburg, Fort Wayne & Chicago Railway Company. He took up the specialty field of bridge engineering. Scherzer in 1885 was employed as the assistant to the chief engineer of the Keystone Bridge Company of Chicago. He was there for eight years. Scherzer entered into business for himself in 1893 in Chicago as a consulting and contracting engineer.

Scherzer was the inventor of a refinement of the bascule bridge called the Scherzer rolling lift bridge. His last engineering work before he died, done in 1893, was the design of two of these rolling lift bridges in Chicago. His design pivots the bridge like a rocking horse. The friction is lowered because it is rolling friction. Moreover when the bridge is open the channel is completely free as the mechanism has rolled away the bridge from the edge leaving the passage free for wide traffic. The first rolling lift bridge ever built was the 1895-opened Van Buren Street Bridge (long since replaced by a newer bridge of a non-rolling bascule type) in the city of Chicago and was patented by Scherzer. The second rolling lift bridge constructed spanned the Chicago River between Jackson and Van Buren Streets. These bridge projects were for the Metropolitan West Side Elevated Railroad Company.

The timing of Scherzer's unique design could not have been better. Railroads were being built with bridges needed to cross rivers in dense urban sites. His patented method made it possible for a bridge to accommodate a change of grade.

In 1908 his contribution was recognized:

William Scherzer [was] the inventor and patentee of what is acknowledged to be one of the most useful mechanisms of the generation. [His] invention has been of great benefit in the advancement of commerce and civilization. [Scherzer’s contribution] has facilitated and made possible the opening and development of the great rivers, canals and waterways throughout the world for the passage of the largest vessels of commerce.

== Patent ==
1893 Lift bridge patent – Because of Scherzer's early demise, his brother took over the Scherzer Rolling Lift Bridge Company and derived fourteen additional related patents pertaining to rolling lift bridges and built 175 of these type bridges nationwide by 1916.

== Death from typhoid fever ==
Scherzer never married. He suffered a year with typhoid fever which brought an attack of brain fever. Scherzer died from the fever on July 20, 1893, at the age of thirty-five in Chicago. His father, William Scherzer Senior, died at the age of forty-one.

== Sources ==
- Biographical, Press (1900). The Successful American. Press Biographical Company. "WILLIAM SCHERZER, C.E., the inventor and patentee of the Scherzer Rolling Lift Bridges, was born at Peru, La Salle County, Illinois, on January 27, 1858."
- Campbell, John A. (1902). A Biographical History, with Portraits, of Prominent Men of the Great West. Western biographical and engraving Company. p. 487.
- Kane, Joseph Nathan (1997). Famous First Facts, Fifth Edition. The H. W. Wilson Company. ISBN 0-8242-0930-3. "The first rolling lift bridge was the Van Buren Street bridge, located over the Chicago River, Chicago, IL, and was opened to traffic on February 4, 1895. It consisted of two arms meeting at the center of the river, which when open provided a clear channel 82 feet in width, measured along the line of the stream. Each arm consisted of three trusses that carried two roadways, each 18 feet wide, and two sidewalks, each eight feet wide. The bridge was operated by two 50-horsepower electric motors on each side of the river. The total construction cost was $169,700. The bridge's construction was patented by William Scherzer of Chicago."
- McBriarty, Patrick T. (1 October 2013). Chicago River Bridges. University of Illinois Press. ISBN 978-0-252-09725-6.
- Railway (1916). Railway Review. Railway Review.
- Sanitary (1899). Engineering Record, Building Record and Sanitary Engineer. McGraw Publishing Company.
- Transit (1902). Transit Journal. "the peculiar problem which had to be met by the Metropolitan Elevated in crossing the Chicago River that led to the design of the Scherzer rolling lift bridge, and this was the first one of the kind constructed."
- Zeising, August (1894). Journal of the Association of Engineering Societies. Board of Managers.
