= Anshe Emet Synagogue =

Jewish congregation in Chicago, Illinois, US

- Location in Chicago, Illinois

Religion
- Affiliation: Conservative Judaism
- Ecclesiastical or organizational status: Synagogue
- Leadership: David Ebstein; Rabbi Benjy Forester
- Status: Active

Location
- Location: 3751 North Broadway, Lake View, Chicago, Illinois
- Country: United States
- Interactive map of Anshe Emet Synagogue
- Coordinates: 41°57′05″N 87°38′54″W

Architecture
- Architect: Alfred S. Alschuler
- Type: Synagogue architecture
- Established: 1873 (as a congregation)
- Completed: 1873 (Sedgwick Avenue); 1876 (Division Street #1); 1878 (Division Street #2); 1893 (Sedgwick Street); 1922 (Gary Place); 1929 (Lake View)

Website
- ansheemet.org

Anshe Emet Synagogue is a Conservative Jewish congregation and synagogue, located at 3751 North Broadway, in the Lake View neighborhood of Chicago, Illinois, in the United States. Established in 1873, it is one of the oldest congregations in Chicago.

== History ==
Anshe Emet Synagogue was established in 1873 in a building on Sedgwick Avenue in Chicago. In 1876, the congregation rented its first permanent meeting place on Division Street and hired Rabbi A.A. Lowenheim, a member of Central Conference of American Rabbis, as religious leader. Two years later, the congregation moved to another rented location on Division Street.

In 1893, Anshe Emet constructed its own building on Sedgwick Street. In 1922, the congregation moved north to a new building on Gary Place (later called Patterson Place) near Broadway. Rabbi Phillip Langh, ordained at the Jewish Theological Seminary of America served as Rabbi from 1920 to 1928.

In 1929, Anshe Emet moved to its present location of 3751 North Broadway in the Lakeview neighborhood of Chicago, Illinois. Rabbi Solomon Goldman served as Head Rabbi from 1929 until his death in 1953. Under Rabbi Goldman's leadership, Anshe Emet Synagogue established a day school, the first in the Conservative movement, and a speakers series, which featured speakers such as Eleanor Roosevelt and Clarence Darrow. In 1951, Anshe Emet purchased the Sheridan Theatre at 4038 N. Sheridan. The congregation used the building, which it renamed The Solomon Goldman Auditorium, for 15 years.

From 1954 to 1959, Rabbi Ira Eisenstein, a leader in the Reconstructionist movement, served as Rabbi of the congregation.

In 1961, Rabbi Seymour J. Cohen became Senior Rabbi. Cohen restored observance of the second day of festival holidays, expanded opportunities for women to participate in religious life, and lead the congregation to renovate and expand the synagogue building.

Rabbi Michael Siegel served as Senior Rabbi of Anshe Emet Synagogue from 1992 to 2026.

== Notable members ==
- Sara Miller, realtor and sculptor, and her husband Ira
