= The Plaza (mall) =

Chicago-area shopping mall

The Plaza (formerly Evergreen Plaza)
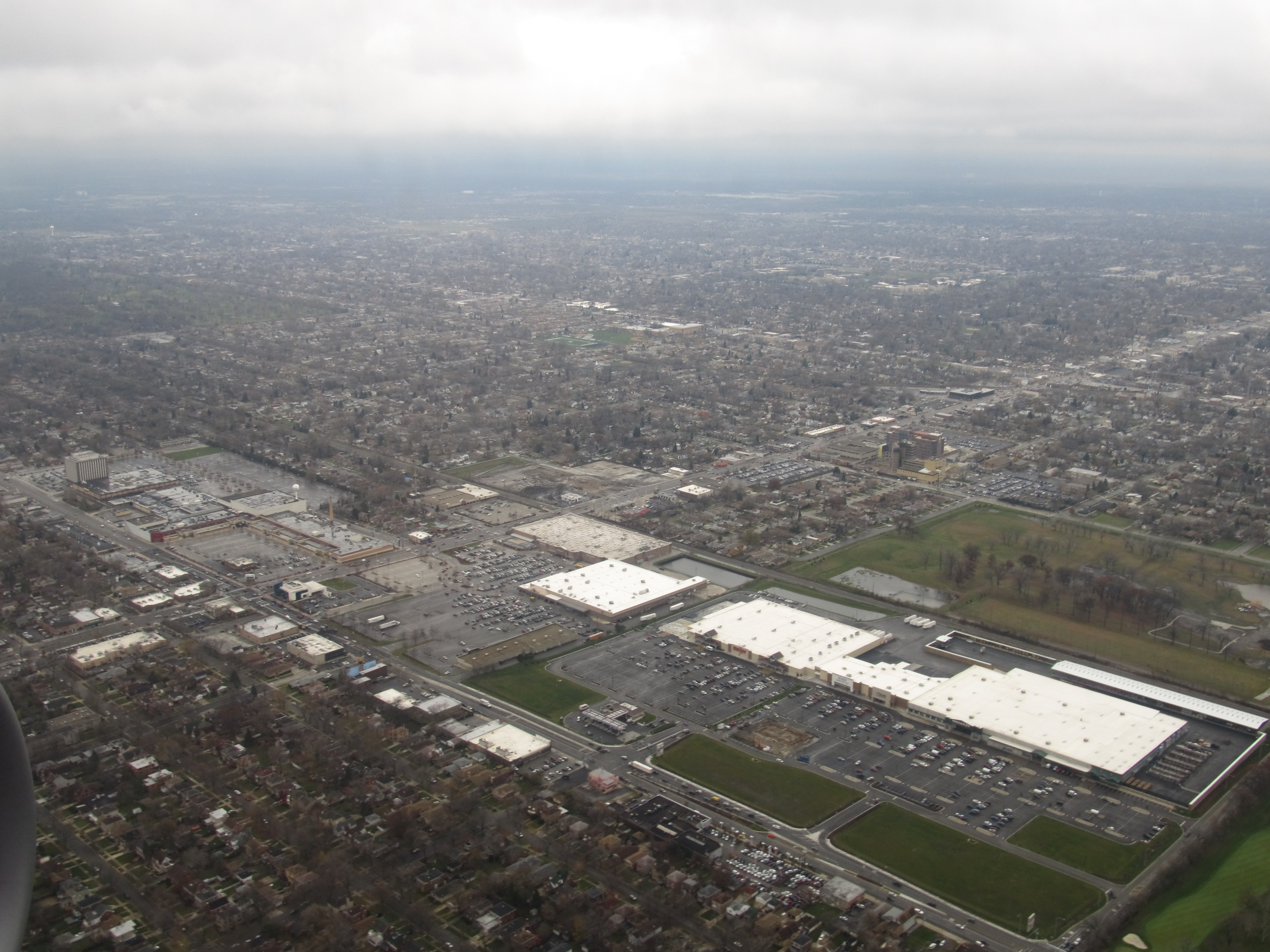
- Location: 9500-9730 S. Western Avenue; Evergreen Park, Illinois, United States
- Coordinates: 41.7184°N 87.6833°W
- Opened: August 24, 1952
- Closed: May 31, 2013
- Developer: Arthur Rubloff, Charles R. Walgreen, Jr.
- Num. of stores: 120+
- Num. of anchor tenants: 3
- Floor area: 1.2 million ft.²
- Floors: 2
- Public transit: Pace

The Plaza, formerly known as Evergreen Plaza, was a shopping mall in Evergreen Park, Illinois, United States. It was legally organized by Arthur Rubloff, who is also credited with coining the phrase "Magnificent Mile" describing the upscale section of Michigan Avenue north of the Chicago River to Oak Street. Rubloff secured the funding for the Evergreen Plaza from the Walgreen family who lived nearby in Beverly, Chicago. The Evergreen Plaza operated from 1952 to 2013. It featured over 120 stores, as well as a food court. The mall closed in 2013 and became an outdoor shopping center. Anchors include Macy's, Whole Foods Market, and Burlington Coat Factory.

== History ==
In 1936, developer Arthur Rubloff conceived a shopping mall in the Evergreen Park area located between the corners of W 95th Street and Western Ave, 98th Street and Western Ave., 98th Street slightly west of Campbell Ave., 96th Street and Campbell Ave., and 95th and Campbell Ave. Opened to the public in August 1952, the mall was originally an 500,000-square-foot (46,000 m^{2}) open-air shopping center anchored by The Fair Store, Lytton's, Barnett's, and Walgreens. The center also contained a Jewel supermarket, which featured a conveyor belt that carried groceries from the store to a parking lot kiosk. The mall's Walgreens was the second self-service Walgreen pharmacy in the chain; it was also the chain's first location in a shopping center.

Evergreen Plaza was regarded by some sources as the first regional mall in the United States. Chas. A. Stevens added a store in 1962, Carson Pirie Scott was added as another anchor. Also, The Fair Store was converted to Montgomery Ward in April, 1964. In 1966, the mall was enclosed, becoming an indoor mall.

Circuit City came in the early 1990s, replacing a Silo electronics store that was formerly in this space.

Montgomery Ward closed its four-story store in 2001 as the chain declared bankruptcy. Shortly afterward, Village of Evergreen Park officials submitted proposals for Target to open in the former Wards; however, these deals fell through. Discount chain National Wholesale Liquidators opened in 2005, occupying two levels of the four-level anchor slot once occupied by Montgomery Ward until it closed in 2008. Walgreens closed in 2005, moving to a newer store about a mile away, and was replaced with an Office Depot. Circuit City also closed in mid-2005.

The movie theater, which had been converted to a triplex in 1977 and quadplex in 1983, closed in 1999. Office Depot closed its Evergreen Park location in 2008, along with many other small retail shops over the last few years. Following 2008, the mall began to gradually diminish as patronage numbers decreased, leading to the chronic closure of many of the original stores. Many businesses that had opened in more recent years had shorter longevity. Planet Fitness signed a 10-year lease to reside in the Plaza in 2011 in the original Walgreens space and began operation in November 2011.

The mall was scheduled for demolition in July 2013, to be replaced by an outdoor shopping center (which the Plaza once was during its first 14 years). However, the building was not demolished and more proposals and rumors started floating around. Two development companies, Debartolo LLC, based in Tampa, and Lormax Stern, a developer from a Detroit suburb, came together to reach a deal to demolish the existing property to build a new outdoor mall that will feature 30-40 brand new stores including Burlington and Whole Foods. Applebee's and Planet Fitness are staying, while Enterprise Rent-A-Car left. Applebee's has left and in its place is now a Chili's. Demolition began in October 7, 2015 and continued until the fall of 2017. Carson's opened a brand-new store in September 2016, replacing the older store that was later demolished. The shopping center opened in Fall of 2017. On April 18, 2018, Carson's parent company The Bon-Ton Stores, announced that they will close all Carson's locations, including the Evergreen Plaza location following their bankruptcy. However, on Black Friday 2018, CSC Generation, Carson's new owner, reopened the location. On August 11, 2020, it was announced that Carson's would be closing again in October 2020. On June 16, 2022, it was announced that Macy's would be opening in the former Carson's space. The first floor will hold Market by Macy's and the second floor will hold Macy's Backstage. The Market by Macy's name was retired in 2023, and the store was rebranded as Macy's.
