= Solomon Goldman =

American rabbi (1893–1953)

Solomon Goldman (August 18, 1893 – May 14, 1953) was an American Conservative rabbi. A noted orator, community leader and scholar, he was especially known for helping to popularize the cause of Zionism in the United States.

== Early life and education ==
Born to Jeanette (née Grossman) and Abraham Abba Goldman on August 18, 1893, in Kozin, Volhynia. He later moved with his parents to New York. He studied at the Rabbi Isaac Elchanan Theological Seminary in New York before acquiring his Bachelor of Arts at New York University in 1917.

Goldman was ordained as a rabbi from the Jewish Theological Seminary in 1918 (where he earned doctorates in Hebrew literature and literature in 1936 and 1946, respectively). Goldman also pursued graduate studies at Columbia University and the University of Chicago. In 1947, Goldman earned a Doctor of Divinity degree from the Jewish Institute of Religion.

== Rabbinical career ==
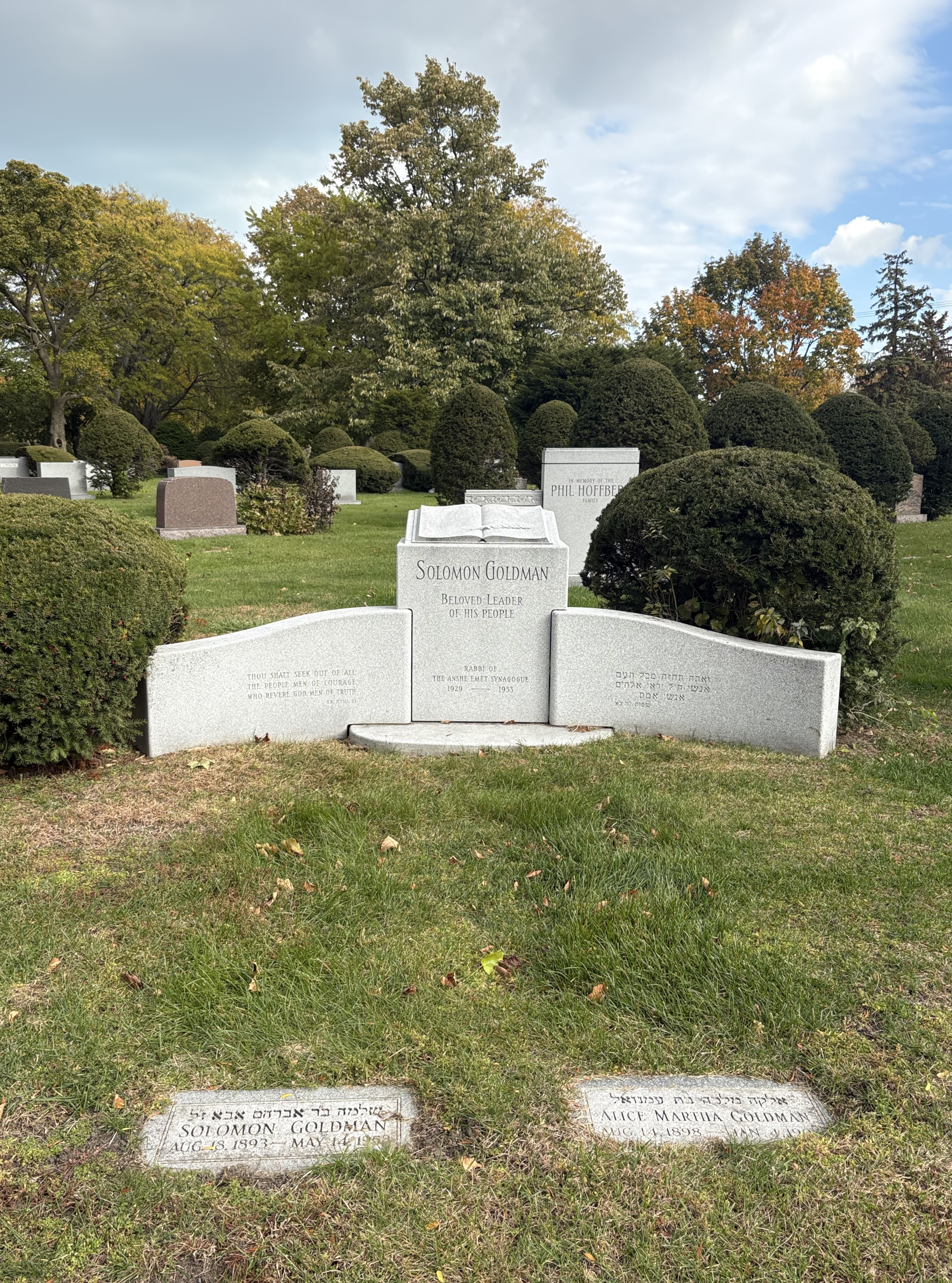
Goldman's grave at Memorial Park Cemetery

As he completed his studies at Jewish Theological Seminary, Goldman served as the rabbi of B'nai Israel Congregation in Brooklyn, New York from 1917 until 1918. From 1919 until 1922, Goldman worked as the rabbi of B'nai Jeshurun Congregation in Cleveland, Ohio (a synagogue which Goldman is credited for "making [...] Conservative"), before switching to the Jewish Center, also of Cleveland, where he stayed until 1929.

While in Cleveland, Goldman worked with Abraham Hayyim Friedland in creating Hebrew educational materials/ In 1929, Goldman left for Anshe Emet Synagogue in Chicago, Illinois, the pulpit over which he presided until the end of his rabbinic career, coinciding with his passing.

As of 1941, Goldman—writing to Rabbi Morris A. Skop—indicated that the community regularly permitted the playing of music on an organ during Simchat Torah and Confirmation services, and, in later years, Goldman permitted the organ to be played on all Shabbat and Yom Tov services. Goldman's further Jewish legal liberalism may be evident in his recalling in 1943 to Rabbi David Goldstein of Omaha, Nebraska that "Jewish services... are not characterized by a proper devotional mood... largely due to their length" and, in consonance with an approach inspired by Jacob Mann, incorporated a triennial cycle in Anshe Emet. Indeed, in writing to Rabbi Albert I. Gordon of Minneapolis, Minnesota, Goldman referenced (again in 1943) that Anshe Emet was accustomed to reading 7 aliyyot of 3 verses each, in addition to an abbreviated haftarah, on a regular Shabbat.

Goldman is also recalled as being "the first Conservative rabbi [to] call women up to recite Torah blessings" for aliyyot.

Goldman died at Michael Reese Hospital in Chicago on May 14, 1953. At his funeral, Israel H. Levinthal of Brooklyn, New York eulogized. Goldman was buried at Memorial Park Cemetery in Skokie.

== Other work ==
Goldman assumed the presidency of the Zionist Organization of America for some time and was a delegate to the World Zionist Congress in 1937, becoming vice president in 1939. In 1937, Goldman traveled to South Africa to conduct a campaign for the Jewish National Fund; four years later, in 1941, Goldman traveled around South America as part of a goodwill tour.

A scholar—and a patron of scholarship and the written word, having for some time given over $8000 annually to Jewish scholars and authors—Goldman, a recipient of the Phi Beta Delta Award in 1938 and a Ginzberg Citation in 1943, served as a joint editor of the Brooklyn Jewish Forum in 1909 and 1910 and as an associate editor of the Journal of Religious Education. Goldman habitually invited Hebrew and Yiddish poets to speak on Friday evenings at Anshe Emet in Chicago to help his community gain familiarity with these artists.

Goldman was a member of the Hillel Foundation Commission, the United Palestine Appeal (which he served as honorary vice-chairman), the Rabbinical Assembly, the National Hebrew Association (of which he was the honorary president), the American Academy of Political and Social Science, the American Oriental Society, the Linguistic Society of America and Societas Spinoza. Goldman authored A Rabbi Takes Stock (1931), The Jew and the Universe (1936), The Golden Chain (1937), Crisis and Decision (1937), Prayers and Readings (1938), Undefeated (1940), The Words of Justice Brandeis (1953) and The Ten Commandments (1956). Goldman contributed to Reflex, the Menorah Journal, New Palestine, the Journal of Religious Education, the Seven Arts Syndicate, Hadaor, Gilyonot (Palestine), and Hetekuphah.

Goldman wrote letters in Hebrew, Yiddish, German and English. Goldman's many recorded correspondences—preserved in the American Jewish Archives, with thanks to his daughter Naomi's contributing of the collection in 1984—include Rabbi David Aronson and other Jewish leaders.

Meyer Weisgal (who would later become the private secretary of Chaim Weizmann) commissioned Goldman to be, alongside Maurice Samuel (and possibly other writers), an author of the script of the pageant The Romance of a People, which debuted on Jewish Day—July 3, 1933 in Chicago—celebrated in tandem with "A Century of Progress," celebrating a century of the city of Chicago.

Goldman is the subject of a biography by fellow Chicago-based Rabbi Jacob J. Weinstein, Solomon Goldman: A Rabbi's Rabbi (New York: Ktav, 1973).
