= Arthur Rubloff =

American businessman (1902–1986)

- Born: June 25, 1902; Duluth, Minnesota, U.S.
- Died: May 24, 1986 (age 83); Chicago, Illinois, U.S.
- Occupation: Real estate developer
- Spouses: Josephine Sheehan (m. 1934; died 1974) Mary Hilem (m. 1980)
- Children: Felicia Taylor (adopted)

Arthur Rubloff (June 25, 1902 – May 24, 1986) was an American real estate developer who founded Arthur Rubloff & Co. and is credited with naming and developing North Michigan Avenue in Chicago, Illinois, into the "Magnificent Mile".

== Biography ==
Rubloff was born to a Jewish family on June 25, 1902, in Duluth, Minnesota, the eldest of five children born to Solomon Rubloff, an immigrant from Russia who owned several jewelry and dry goods stores. The family moved to Chisholm, Minnesota, but lost everything to a fire in 1908 which destroyed the town. In 1914, at the age of 12, Rubloff ran away to Duluth, Minnesota, where he worked as galley boy on the J.S. Stevenson, an ore boat. In 1915, he moved to Cincinnati where he worked at a furniture manufacturer. In 1917, he moved to Chicago where his parents had moved and worked for his father's ladies clothing manufacturing company. His parents' factory burned down and his father enlisted his son to lease some real estate he had accumulated and was serendipitously offered a job by the lessee who liked his gumption. In 1919, he went to work for Robert White & Co selling downtown office space in Chicago. In 1930, he went into business for himself with only $700, having squandered all the money he made. He named the company Arthur Rubloff & Co. His break came when he negotiated a complicated and large North Kansas City development project for investment-banking firm, Allen & Co. Using the proceeds from that transaction and leveraging his relationship with Allen and Co, he developed – in the late 1940s – Evergreen Plaza, one of the first shopping malls. He promoted, developed, and transformed North Michigan Avenue into the "Magnificent Mile". He helped to developed the Old Town neighborhood in Chicago, and the Southland and Sun Valley projects in San Francisco as well as co-developing Carl Sandburg Village, the Ft. Dearborn Project, and proposing the North Loop project known as the Chicago 21 Plan. Sara Miller, later to win renown as a sculptor, was for many years an executive with Rubloff's firm. Rubloff had a private chauffeur for his business use with his goings and coming in the Chicago area. His private chauffeur was Michael Ciró Rizzo, an immigrant from Palermo, Italy. Rizzo was a trusting and hard worker to Mr. Rubloff. When Rizzo's granddaughter, Debra was married, October 2, 1982. Rubloff gifted the happy couple a set of Tiffany and Co., plates for their wedding present. Debra still has these plates today. Along with Mr. Rubloff's Hoyle Game book, with

"Arthur Rubloff", engraved on the spine of the book.

Rubloff estimated his net worth at $100 million.

== Personal life ==
In 1934, he married Josephine Sheehan; she died in 1974. In 1980, he married New York native Mary (née Hilem) Taylor, former wife of actor Rod Taylor and adopted her daughter, Felicia Taylor. After Rubloff's death, Hilem married Florida real estate developer Lewis M. Schott. Rubloff died on May 24, 1986, at his home in Chicago. Services were held at Temple Sholom in Chicago.
