= Felicia Taylor =

American journalist (1964–2023)

- Born: Felicia Rodrica Sturt Taylor; August 28, 1964; New York City, New York, U.S.
- Died: September 8, 2023 (aged 59); Palm Beach, Florida, U.S.
- Occupation: Anchor-correspondent
- Years active: 1998–2023
- Spouses: Charles Beall Schuster (m. 1995, divorced) Peter Gottsegen (m. 2021)
- Parent(s): Rod Taylor; Mary Hilem
- Family: Arthur Rubloff (stepfather)

Felicia Rodrica Sturt Taylor (August 28, 1964 – September 8, 2023) was an American anchor-correspondent who worked for CNN International's World Business Today, and contributed to the Business Updates unit for CNN. She was the co-host of Retirement Living TV's Daily Cafe until November 2009.

== Biography ==
Felicia Taylor was the daughter of Australian-born actor Rod Taylor and his second wife, fashion model Mary Hilem. After her parents divorced, her mother married Chicago real estate developer Arthur Rubloff, who adopted Felicia. In 1986, Rubloff died and her mother married Florida real estate developer Lewis M. Schott in 1994. Her stepsister, Victoria (née Schott) de Rothschild, is the second and former wife of British financier Sir Evelyn de Rothschild. A graduate (BA) of Northwestern University, Taylor was a business news anchor and a correspondent for CNN International, and CNBC. Prior to CNBC, she was weekend anchor on WNBC-TV in New York. She joined WNBC in 1998 and left in September 2006. Before WNBC, Taylor worked at the Financial News Network, Financial Times TV in London.

== Personal life and death ==
On March 25, 1995, Taylor married Charles Beall Schuster, a bond salesman. They later divorced. In November 2021, she married Peter Gottsegen, a founder of CAI Private Equity, and former General Partner of Salomon Brothers, who survived her.

Taylor died in Palm Beach, Florida, on September 8, 2023, at the age of 59.
