= Pilsen Historic District =

Historic district in Illinois, United States

- U.S. National Register of Historic Places
- U.S. Historic district
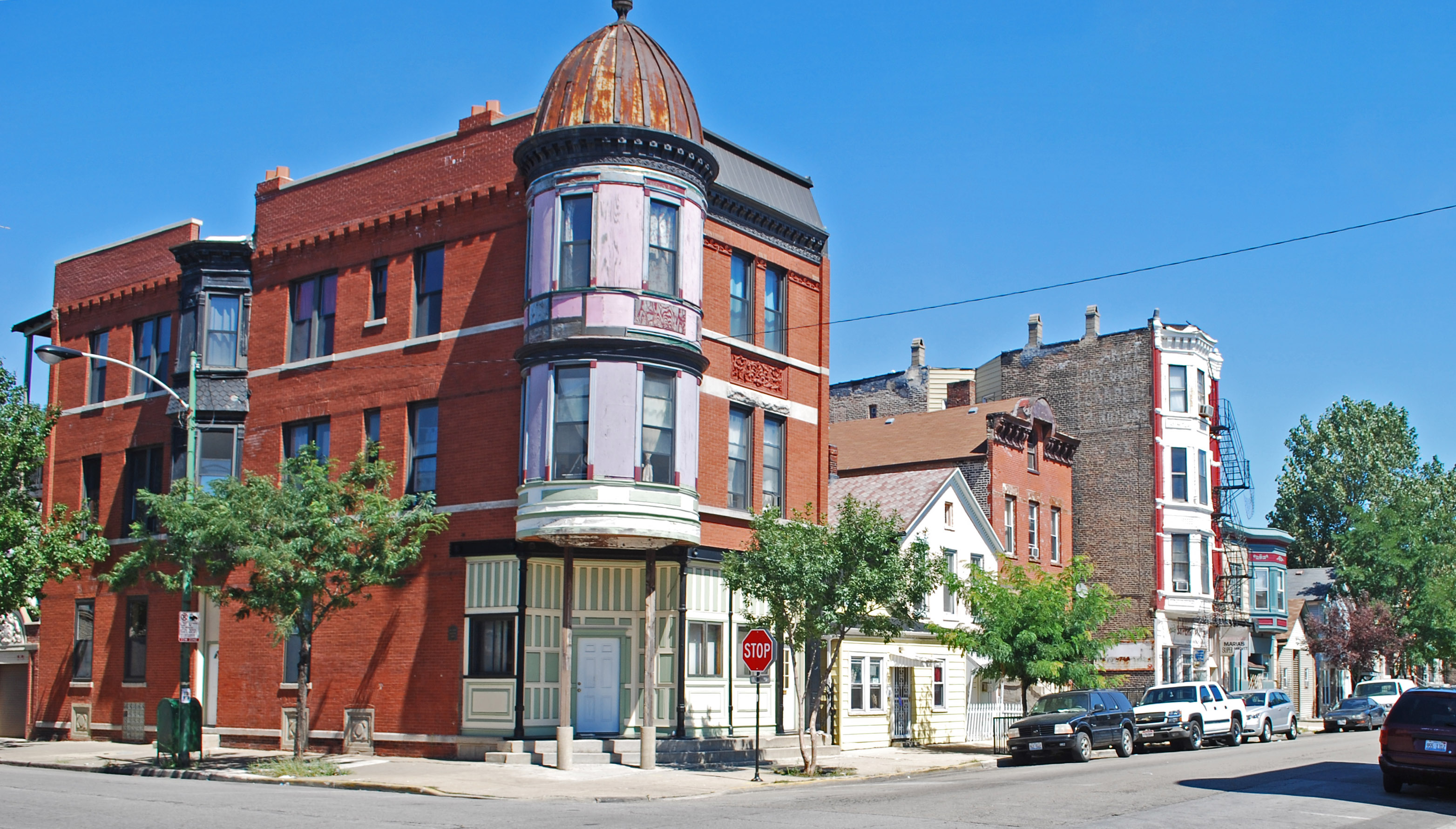
- Pilsen Historic District, 21st and Wood, Chicago IL

- Location within Chicago metropolitan area Location within Illinois Location within the United States
- Location: Chicago, Illinois, United States
- Coordinates: 41°51′14″N 87°39′28″W
- NRHP reference No.: 05001609
- Added to NRHP: February 1, 2006

The Pilsen Historic District is located in the Lower West Side community area of Chicago and is among the few neighborhoods with buildings that survived the Great Chicago Fire of 1871. Being named after the Czech city of Plzeň, the neighborhood of Pilsen was originally made up of mostly Central Europeans but is now predominantly Mexican-American.

== History ==
Pilsen was formally founded in 1878, making the neighborhood a factor in the political and economic change planned in Chicago. In the late 19th century Pilsen was inhabited by Czech immigrants who named the district after Plzeň (German: Pilsen), the fourth largest city in today's Czech Republic. The population also included in smaller numbers other ethnic groups from Austria-Hungary including Slovaks, Slovenes, Croats and Austrians, as well as immigrants of Polish and Lithuanian heritage. In 1934 a majority of Czechs, Croatians, Poles, and Slovaks sustained Pilsen, making it an ethnic working-class neighborhood.

In 1945, the Committee on Minority Groups established a Subcommittee on Social Services for Mexican Migratory Workers due to the increasing migration of Mexican migrant contract workers (braceros). The Czechs had replaced the Germans, who had settled there first with the Irish in the mid-19th century. Although there was a growing Mexican American presence in the late 1950s, it was not until 1962-63 when there was a significant increase in the numbers of Mexican Americans in Pilsen due to the destruction of the neighborhood west of Halsted Street between Roosevelt and Taylor Streets to create room for the construction of the University of Illinois at Chicago. The destruction closed nearby factories where Mexican migrants worked. Other contributing factors to the increasing numbers include the state-sponsored mass labor importation programs in the United States of majority Mexican and Puerto Rican migrants.

Although this area was predominantly Czech American, it was also an important entry point for Mexican immigrants for several decades. Latinos became the majority in 1970 when they surpassed the Slavic population. The neighborhood continued to serve as port of entry for immigrants, both documented and undocumented, mostly from Mexico. In a 2003 case study, Mexican residents remember the early experience of living in early Pilsen. Signs that read ‘No dogs or Mexicans’ were put up all around businesses from the 1950s to 1960s, during the major influx of Mexican immigrants. Other experiences included banks refusing to give mortgages because Pilsen had the largest population of Mexican immigrants.

Since 2000, the Mexican population in Pilsen has decreased somewhat. In 2003, Pilsen was 93% Mexican-American, and the Chicagoland Chamber of Commerce identified Pilsen as "an authentically Mexican neighborhood” and “a true Chicago Barrio.”

On February 1, 2006, Pilsen was selected for the National Register of Historic Places.

Pilsen is home to Chicago's largest migrant shelter, located between Cermak Road and the southern branch of the Chicago River, opened in fall 2023. People living at the shelter have described it as having "harsh shelter conditions, including cramped living quarters, mistreatment from workers, freezing temperatures, and unsanitary bathrooms," with an analysis by Borderless Magazine concluding that the shelter "fails to meet the basic standards for emergency shelter laid out by the U.N. Refugee Agency." In December 2023, several children staying at the shelter became ill, with one of them dying.

As early as 1985, Pilsen's proximity to the downtown area and its low-value property became an ideal neighborhood for gentrification. Pilsen residents and community institutions mobilized against two major redevelopments Chicago 21 Plan (the mid-1970s) and Chicago 1992 World's Fair (early to mid-1980s). The neighborhood's long-lasting defense is prompted by its alliance of local developers, Pilsen homeowners, and the city. As of 2014 growing community activists like The Pilsen Alliance, an organization from 1998 that mobilized against the expansion of the University of Illinois at Chicago (UIC) in Pilsen, continued to display an extensive stronghold against real estate developer and city plans.

In 2016 increasing gentrification led to the displacement of residents, the shutting down of businesses, and a cultural change in the historically Mexican neighborhood. According to the Chicago Sun-Times as of 2023 Pilsen community organizations are protesting the increasing property taxes that continue to force residents out of their homes.

== See also ==
- National Register of Historic Places listings in West Side Chicago
- Czechs in Chicago
- Poles in Chicago
- Mexicans in Chicago
