= Czechs in Chicago =

Chicago has a large Czech population (colloquially known as "Czechcagoans"). As of 2000, Chicago had the largest Czech population among US metropolitan areas, and Illinois had the second-largest Czech-American population after Texas. There are 72,058 residents of Czech heritage living in the greater Chicago area as of 2023.

== History ==
The First Czechs came to Chicago in the 1850s and 1860s, shortly after the Habsburgs crushed the Czech Revolution of 1848 in the Crown Kingdom of Bohemia. Their Slovak counterparts would arrive in the city about 40 years later in the early 20th Century. They called their first settlement in the city, concentrated around Canal, Harrison, and Twelfth Streets, Praha (Prague), where they would establish several Czech institutions. After the Great Chicago Fire damaged much of Praha and Italians and Greeks began to move into the area, the Czech community then migrated further south into Chicago's Pilsen neighborhood, which they named after Pilsen, Czechia. The first Czech Catholic Church, St. Wenceslaus, was founded at De Koven and Des Plaines streets in 1863. America's first daily Czech newspaper Svornost ("concord") began publication in 1875. Also, common in many Czech-American communities was a Sokol (equivalent to a German Turnverein), or a gymnastics facility, which fostered fitness and community bonding, located at Canal and Taylor. Later, more upwardly mobile generations of Czech Americans migrated to Cicero and Berwyn, where many of them took up jobs at the Hawthorne Works Western Electric plant making America's telephones.

Tragedy struck Chicago's Czech American community in 1911, when five-year old Elsie Paroubek was kidnapped and murdered. As a result, the Czech American community mobilized massively to help in the searches for the girl and support her family, and gained much sympathy from the general American public.

In 1915, the SS Eastland Disaster on the Chicago River resulted in the largest loss of life from a single shipwreck on the Great Lakes, with 844 killed. Several hundred Czech-Americans were estimated to have been among the passengers who died when the ship, which was transporting a group of Hawthorne Works Western Electric workers and their families for an outing, capsized in the Chicago River.

In 1931, the Czech community celebrated when Anton Cermak was elected mayor of Chicago, thwarting incumbent William Thompson's attempt at a second term and thus defeating the Irish American political machine which up until then had dominated the city's political administration. Indeed, Cermak ushered in a new era of Chicago politics: every Chicago mayor since has been a member of the Democratic Party. Cermak was later killed by a bullet intended for President Franklin D. Roosevelt, and today is buried in the Bohemian National Cemetery on Chicago's Northwest Side. Cermak lends his name to Cermak Road, which runs through several of the historically Czech / Bohemian neighborhoods on Chicago's Southwest Side.

== Notable Czech Chicagoans ==
- Adolph J. Sabath (*1866) - member of the U.S. House of Representatives from Illinois from 1907 to 1952; born in Záboří, Bohemia, Austrian Empire
- Anton Cermak (*1873) – mayor of Chicago from 1931 to 1933, born in Kladno, Bohemia, Austria-Hungary
- Helen Repa (*1884) – western electric nurse, hero of the SS Eastland Disaster of 1915, born in Chicago.
- George Halas (*1895), nicknamed 'Papa Bear' – professional football player, coach, and team owner, he was the founder and owner of the National Football League's Chicago Bears; born in Chicago
- Charles Turzak (*1899) – Chicago artist and printmaker
- Ray Kroc (*1902) – businessman who purchased the fast food company McDonald's in 1961 and served as its CEO from 1967 to 1973, Kroc is credited with the global expansion of McDonald's; born in Oak Park, Illinois
- Kim Novak (*1933) – actress, songwriter and artist best known for the 1958 movie Vertigo; born in Chicago
- Gene Cernan (*1934) – American astronaut and fighter pilot, one of the twelve men who walked on the Moon; born and grew up in Chicago
- Judy Baar Topinka (*1944) – former Illinois state treasurer
- Milos Stehlik (*1949) – founder of Facets Multimedia, film distributor, commentator; born in Slaný, Czechoslovakia

== Institutions ==
- Chicago Czech American Community Center
