= Rubloff Company =

American real estate company

- Industry: real estate
- Founded: 1930; 96 years ago
- Founder: Arthur Rubloff
- Headquarters: Chicago, Illinois
- Area served: United States

Rubloff Company was one of the largest and oldest real estate companies in the U.S. city of Chicago.

== History ==
The company was established in 1930 by Arthur Rubloff, who was responsible for some of the most notable and successful real estate developments in Chicago, including The Brunswick Building, the Greyhound Bus Terminal, Evergreen Plaza Shopping Center and the Carl Sandburg Village. Rubloff was involved in hundreds of real estate deals during his career that helped to shape the city of Chicago. He died in 1986 at the age of 83.

Rubloff grew rapidly in the 1970s and 1980s, establishing its presence in twelve metropolitan areas, including; Los Angeles, San Francisco, Washington D.C., Detroit, Houston, Dallas, Atlanta, Cincinnati and Cleveland. In 1993, Rubloff sold its commercial operations including Rubloff Development Group, Inc., and concentrated its efforts on tackling Chicago's residential sector.

In 1996 Howard Weinstein and Tom Horwich became co-owners. Today, Rubloff operates out of seven different offices, covering areas including the North Shore, Lincoln Park, the Gold Coast, the South Loop and Harbor Country in Michigan.

In 2006 Rubloff had gross revenues of $1.35 billion. Prudential Preferred Properties acquired Rubloff in September, 2009, and it is now known as Prudential Rubloff Properties.
