= Peru, Illinois =

Peru
- City
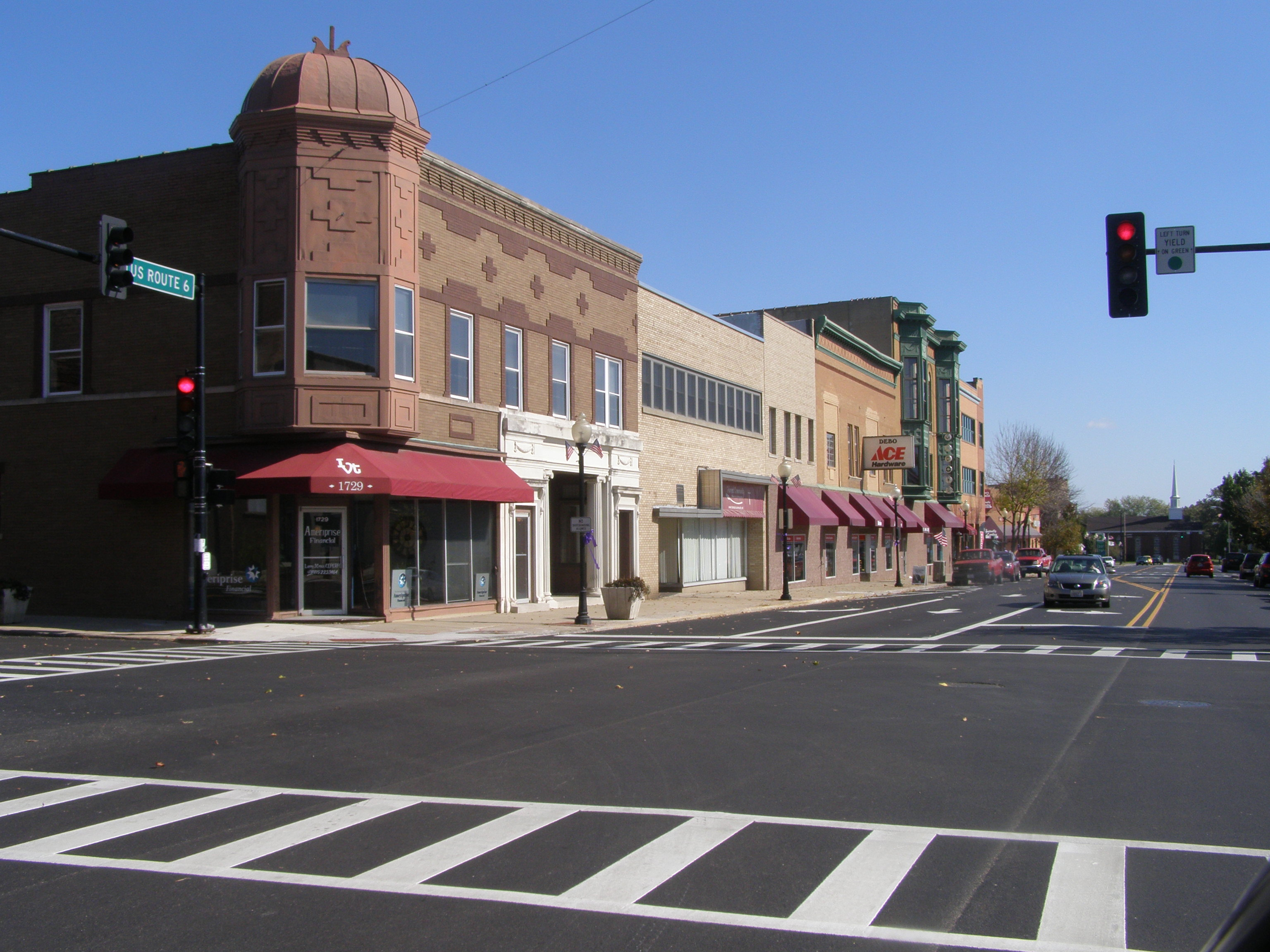
- 4th Street looking east in downtown Peru

- Flag Seal

- Location of Peru in LaSalle County, Illinois
- Coordinates: 41°21′20″N 89°07′33″W
- Country: United States
- State: Illinois
- County: Bureau, LaSalle
- Townships: Peru, Dimmick, Hall
- Founded: 1835

Government
  - Mayor: Ken Kolowski

Area
  - Total: 10.12 sq mi (26.21 km^{2})
  - Land: 9.98 sq mi (25.86 km^{2})
  - Water: 0.14 sq mi (0.35 km^{2})
- Elevation: 640 ft (200 m)

Population (2020)
  - Total: 9,896
  - Estimate (2024): 9,793
  - Density: 977.9/sq mi (377.57/km^{2})
- Time zone: UTC−6 (CST)
  - Summer (DST): UTC−5 (CDT)
- ZIP Code(s): 61354
- Area code: 815
- FIPS code: 17-59234
- GNIS feature ID: 2396189
- Website: City of Peru official website

Peru is a city in LaSalle and Bureau counties, Illinois, United States. The population was 9,896 at the 2020 census, down from 10,295 at the 2010 census. It is part of the Ottawa, IL Micropolitan Statistical Area. Peru and its twin city, LaSalle, make up the core of Illinois Valley.

== History ==
The city's first settler was John Hays, who arrived in 1830. The city was organized as a borough in 1838, incorporated as a village February 25, 1845, and incorporated as a city on March 13, 1851. The original plat was between West Street, 4th Street, and East Street (now Pine Street).

=== River City (1831–1933) ===
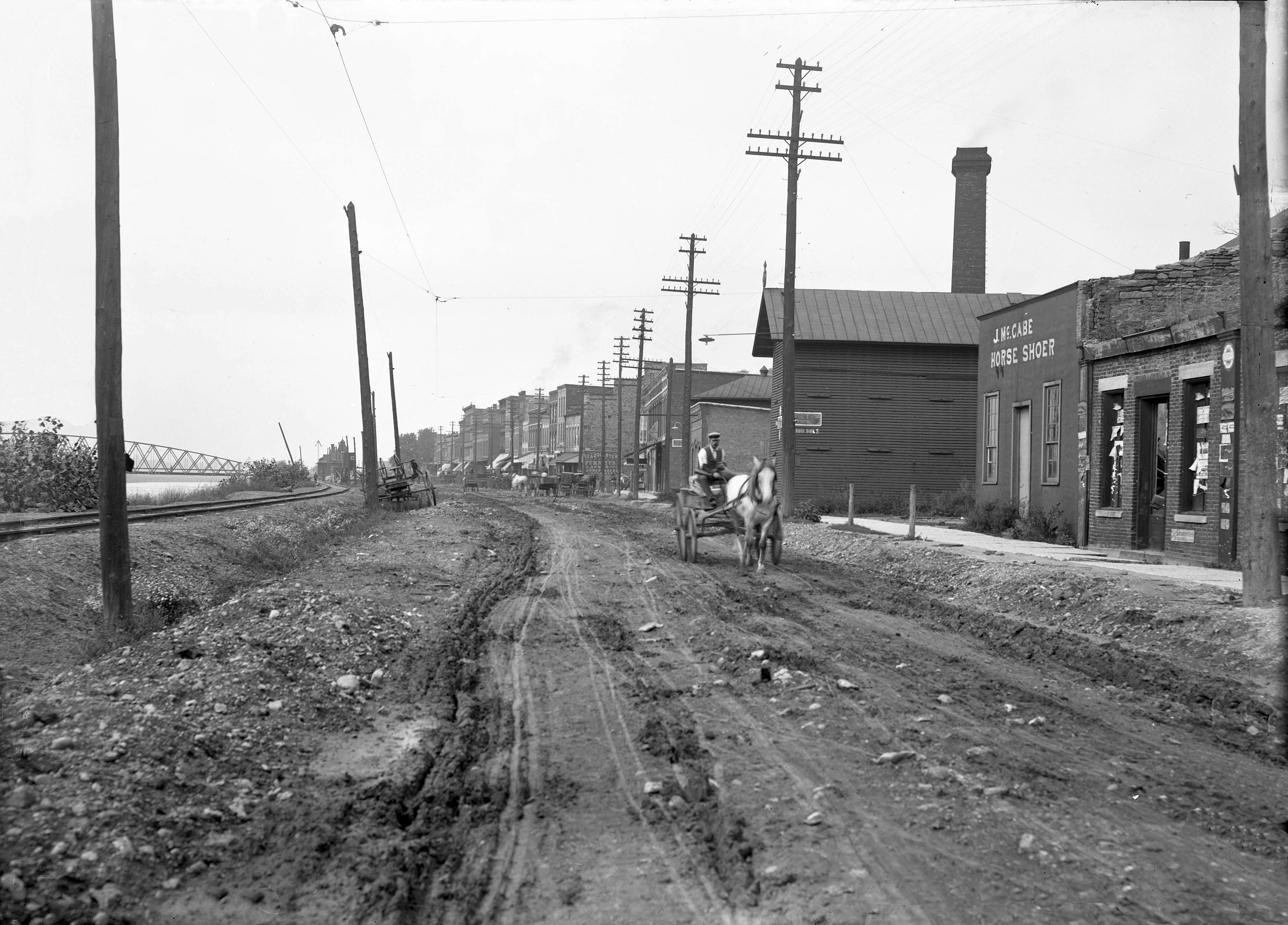
Peru, circa 1900

Since the first steamboat Traveler reached Peru in 1831, the city had high hopes of being the western terminus for the Illinois & Michigan Canal. LaSalle won that designation, but Peru became a busy steamboat port at the head of navigation on the Illinois River. Captain McCormick was involved in the Five Day Line, making record fast trips between Peru and St. Louis, Missouri. Senator Gilson reported to land surveyor, Grenville Dodge, that the town would soon outstrip Chicago due to its favorable location along the river and railroads.

Water Street was a thin ribbon pressed between the bluff and the river, leading to the growth eastward of a large industrial district. Developed along the river and the canal, it was served by the Rock Island Railroad and Chicago Burlington and Quincy. These important transportation routes, along with coal mining in at least four mines lasting from 1857 until 1949, were the basis for Peru's rise to an industrial center. Many entrepreneurs grew into prominent businessmen and advanced the interests of Peru and the region. Prominent companies from that time included Maze Lumber, Maze Nails, Peru Plow and Wheel Works, Huse and Loomis Ice Co, Brunner Foundry, Star Union Brewery, Hebel Brewery, Illinois Zinc (Peru and LaSalle were sometimes referred to as "Zinc City"), and many others. Peru's citizens were intent on improving their town, so far as constructing a plank road, northwest of town, a toll road meant to reach Dixon, Illinois.

Peru's story became a story of two levels. The story of Water Street and the bottoms, and the town growing above the bluff. Peru tried hard to link the two. For example, the Peru Horse and Dummy Railroad was driven to dissolution by the city's impossible mandate that it create a loop from Water Street to the upper bluff.

=== Clock City (1884–1980) ===
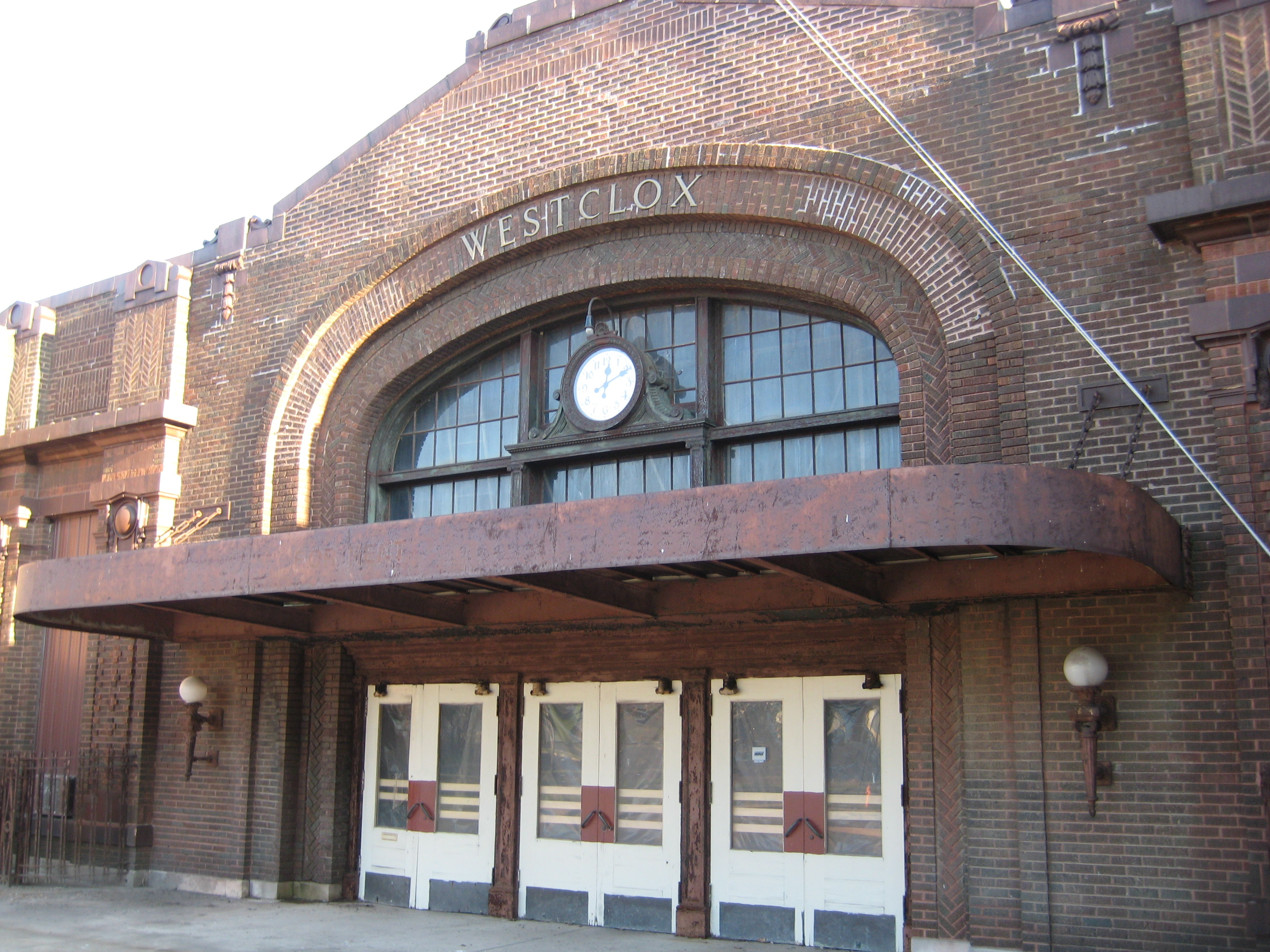
Westclox building

In 1884, Stahlberg started the United Clock Company in Peru. Shortly afterward, it went bankrupt and was reorganized with the help of Frederick William Matthiessen as the Western Clock Company. By 1905 it had grown into a national company, producing over 1 million alarm clocks per year. In 1909, they trademarked "Westclox". In 1917 they became a model for workers' benefits, one of the early companies to pay life insurance and have a safety committee. Later on, they limited the work week, constructed a company park with a tennis court and horseshoe courts, developed workers' housing, and established a school for watchmakers with provision for scholarships. In 1935 it was the safest company in the nation, with 11 million hours without a lost time accident.

During World War II the company made mechanical fuses for the government and had more than 600 of its employees enter the armed forces. At its height, it manufactured nearly 2 million clocks and watches annually and employed over 4,000 persons. It closed the Peru factory in 1980; the loss of jobs caused a rapid decline in population in LaSalle and Peru.

Today the old Westclox Administration Building is now the headquarter for the Carus Corporation and the rest of the Westclox complex is being redeveloped into a commercial center. The building is also home to the Westclox Museum. The building caught fire on July 14, 2023.

== Geography ==
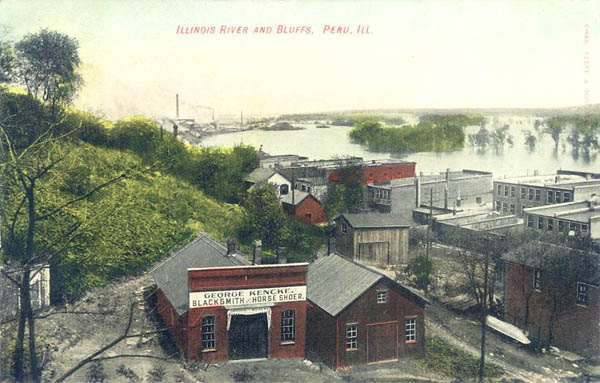
Historical photo of the bluffs of the Illinois River Valley in Peru

As of 2021, Peru has a total area of 10.12 square miles (26.21 km^{2}), of which 9.986 square miles (25.86 km^{2}) (or 98.68%) is land and 0.134 square miles (0.35 km^{2}) (or 1.32%) is water.

Located on the Illinois River, Peru lies 3 miles (4.8 km) west of the intersection of two major interstate highways: Interstate 39 and Interstate 80. The city is also the western terminus of the historic Illinois and Michigan Canal. Before the Illinois Waterway was constructed, the Illinois River was navigable only up to Peru. Starved Rock State Park, a regional tourist attraction, is located 5 miles (8.0 km) south-east of the community. Peru has a twin city on its eastern edge, LaSalle.

=== Climate ===
Climate data for Peru, Illinois (1991–2020 normals, extremes 1901–present)
Month	Jan	Feb	Mar	Apr	May	Jun	Jul	Aug	Sep	Oct	Nov	Dec	Year
Record high °F (°C)	68 (20)	76 (24)	84 (29)	94 (34)	105 (41)	107 (42)	113 (45)	106 (41)	103 (39)	93 (34)	82 (28)	70 (21)	113 (45)
Mean maximum °F (°C)	52.9 (11.6)	57.0 (13.9)	71.8 (22.1)	81.9 (27.7)	89.0 (31.7)	93.5 (34.2)	93.9 (34.4)	92.7 (33.7)	90.5 (32.5)	84.0 (28.9)	69.3 (20.7)	56.4 (13.6)	96.1 (35.6)
Mean daily maximum °F (°C)	30.0 (−1.1)	34.5 (1.4)	47.5 (8.6)	60.9 (16.1)	72.5 (22.5)	81.3 (27.4)	84.0 (28.9)	82.2 (27.9)	76.9 (24.9)	63.9 (17.7)	48.4 (9.1)	35.5 (1.9)	59.8 (15.4)
Daily mean °F (°C)	22.0 (−5.6)	26.0 (−3.3)	37.4 (3.0)	49.3 (9.6)	60.9 (16.1)	70.3 (21.3)	73.4 (23.0)	71.5 (21.9)	64.8 (18.2)	52.5 (11.4)	39.2 (4.0)	27.7 (−2.4)	49.6 (9.8)
Mean daily minimum °F (°C)	14.0 (−10.0)	17.6 (−8.0)	27.3 (−2.6)	37.7 (3.2)	49.2 (9.6)	59.4 (15.2)	62.8 (17.1)	60.8 (16.0)	52.6 (11.4)	41.1 (5.1)	30.0 (−1.1)	19.9 (−6.7)	39.4 (4.1)
Mean minimum °F (°C)	−7.9 (−22.2)	−2.6 (−19.2)	9.0 (−12.8)	24.3 (−4.3)	35.6 (2.0)	47.1 (8.4)	51.9 (11.1)	50.7 (10.4)	38.6 (3.7)	26.9 (−2.8)	14.6 (−9.7)	0.5 (−17.5)	−12.1 (−24.5)
Record low °F (°C)	−26 (−32)	−24 (−31)	−11 (−24)	13 (−11)	25 (−4)	37 (3)	42 (6)	37 (3)	25 (−4)	14 (−10)	−5 (−21)	−21 (−29)	−26 (−32)
Average precipitation inches (mm)	1.81 (46)	1.77 (45)	2.28 (58)	3.77 (96)	4.49 (114)	4.62 (117)	3.89 (99)	3.70 (94)	3.41 (87)	3.50 (89)	2.71 (69)	2.10 (53)	38.05 (966)
Average snowfall inches (cm)	8.6 (22)	5.5 (14)	4.0 (10)	0.6 (1.5)	0.0 (0.0)	0.0 (0.0)	0.0 (0.0)	0.0 (0.0)	0.0 (0.0)	0.2 (0.51)	0.9 (2.3)	8.7 (22)	28.5 (72)
Average extreme snow depth inches (cm)	6.3 (16)	5.0 (13)	3.0 (7.6)	0.3 (0.76)	0.0 (0.0)	0.0 (0.0)	0.0 (0.0)	0.0 (0.0)	0.0 (0.0)	0.1 (0.25)	0.4 (1.0)	4.8 (12)	9.7 (25)
Average precipitation days (≥ 0.01 in)	9.9	7.8	10.8	12.4	12.8	10.8	9.4	9.5	7.8	9.5	10.0	10.2	120.9
Average snowy days (≥ 0.1 in)	6.3	4.7	2.4	0.4	0.0	0.0	0.0	0.0	0.0	0.0	1.1	5.4	20.3
Source: NOAA

== Demographics ==
Historical population
Census	Pop.	Note	%±
1850	1,279		—
1860	3,139		145.4%
1870	3,650		16.3%
1880	4,632		26.9%
1890	5,550		19.8%
1900	6,863		23.7%
1910	7,984		16.3%
1920	8,869		11.1%
1930	9,121		2.8%
1940	8,983		−1.5%
1950	8,653		−3.7%
1960	10,460		20.9%
1970	11,772		12.5%
1980	10,873		−7.6%
1990	9,302		−14.4%
2000	9,820		5.6%
2010	10,295		4.8%
2020	9,896		−3.9%
2025 (est.)	9,793		−1.0%
Decennial US Census

=== 2020 census ===
As of the 2020 census, Peru had a population of 9,896. The median age was 46.1 years. 19.5% of residents were under the age of 18 and 23.1% of residents were 65 years of age or older. For every 100 females there were 92.8 males, and for every 100 females age 18 and over there were 89.9 males age 18 and over.

As of the 2020 census, there were 2,760 families residing in the city. The population density was 977.87 inhabitants per square mile (377.56/km^{2}). There were 4,825 housing units at an average density of 476.78 per square mile (184.09/km^{2}).

99.7% of residents lived in urban areas, while 0.3% lived in rural areas.

There were 4,420 households in Peru, of which 23.8% had children under the age of 18 living in them. Of all households, 41.9% were married-couple households, 21.0% were households with a male householder and no spouse or partner present, and 30.6% were households with a female householder and no spouse or partner present. About 37.0% of all households were made up of individuals and 17.9% had someone living alone who was 65 years of age or older.

Of the housing units, 8.4% were vacant. The homeowner vacancy rate was 2.0% and the rental vacancy rate was 10.3%.

Racial composition as of the 2020 census
Race	Number	Percent
White	8,596	86.9%
Black or African American	130	1.3%
American Indian and Alaska Native	21	0.2%
Asian	173	1.7%
Native Hawaiian and Other Pacific Islander	3	0.0%
Some other race	265	2.7%
Two or more races	708	7.2%
Hispanic or Latino (of any race)	933	9.4%

=== Income and poverty ===
The median income for a household in the city was $52,635, and the median income for a family was $73,477. Males had a median income of $50,645 versus $24,706 for females. The per capita income for the city was $34,268. About 6.3% of families and 11.3% of the population were below the poverty line, including 22.9% of those under age 18 and 3.2% of those age 65 or over.

== Economy ==
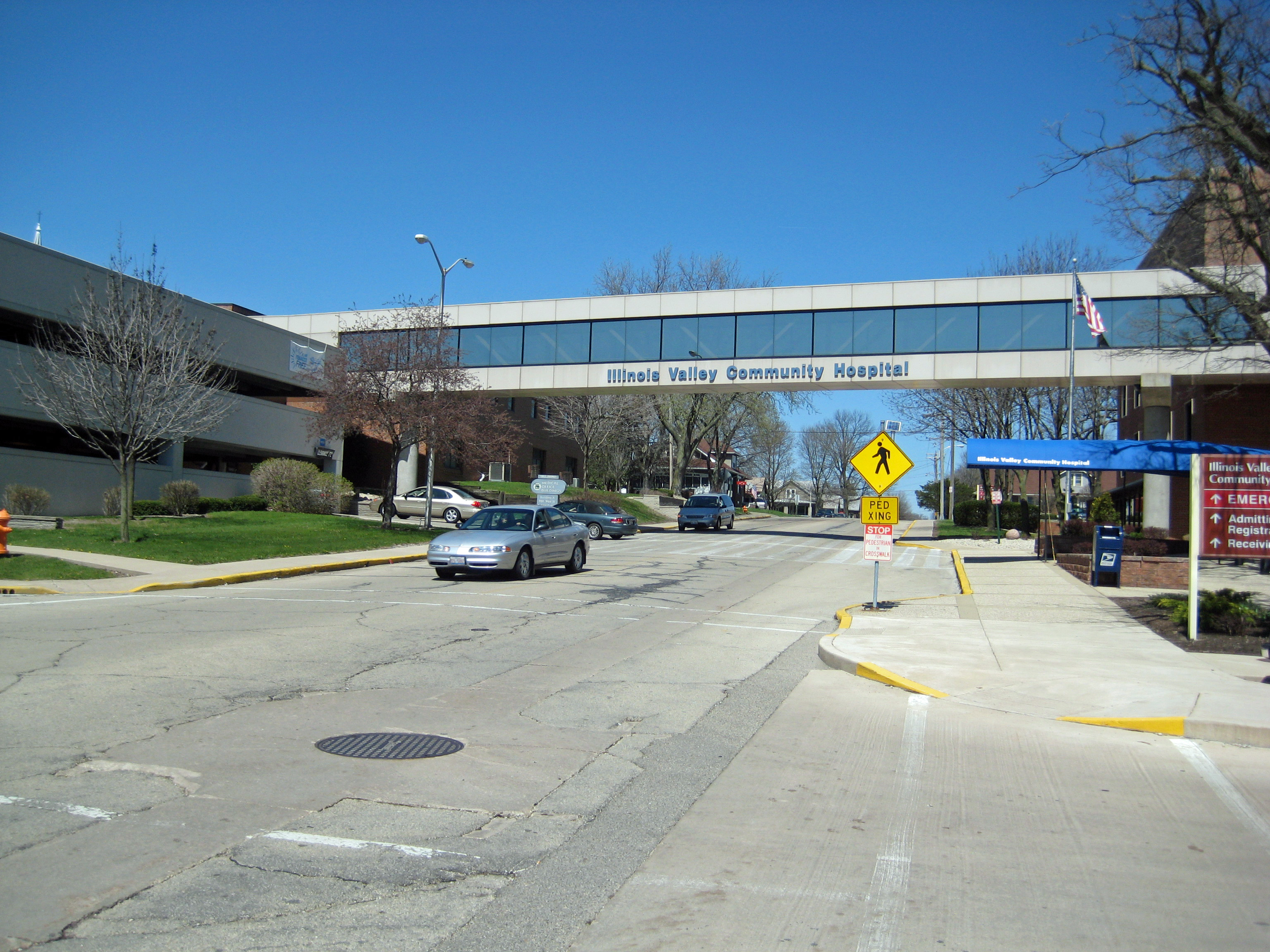
St. Margaret's Health Peru (formerly Illinois Valley Community Hospital)

There are a number of business districts in Peru. The largest is at the intersection of I-80 and IL-251. Then there are three smaller districts along the US-6 Corridor, including Peru's downtown. The largest employers in Peru are the Peru Mall, the Illinois Valley Community Hospital, Walmart, James Hardie, OfficeMax, the American Nickeloid, Liberty Village, Double D Express, Heritage Manor Nursing Home, Eakas, Target, and Horizon Industries.

Peru is the home of at least three very old companies. It is the national headquarters of American Nickeloid, started in 1898, and the W.H. Maze Co, dealing in lumber and nails, which started the year the Illinois and Michigan Canal opened in 1848. Maze Nails is one of America's last remaining nail makers. Peru is home to the offices of Carus Chemical Company, started in 1915, today one of the largest manufacturers of potassium permanganate in the world.

In 2021, the DuPage Pistol Shrimp baseball team relocated from Lisle, Illinois to Peru, becoming the Illinois Valley Pistol Shrimp. The Pistol Shrimp are a member of the collegiate Prospect League.

== Education ==
Schools serving Peru include:

=== Elementary schools ===
- Peru Public Schools
- Peru Catholic School
- LaSalle-Peru Christian School

=== High schools ===
- LaSalle-Peru Township High School
- St. Bede Academy
- LaSalle-Peru Christian School

== Transportation ==
The city operates Illinois Valley Regional Airport.

== Notable people ==
- John Virginius Bennes, architect
- William P. Bettendorf and Joseph W. Bettendorf, industrialists
- Zez Confrey, composer and pianist
- Franklin Corwin, US congressman
- Gary G. Dahl, politician
- Grenville Dodge, Civil War general and transcontinental railroad constructor
- Mike Goff, offensive lineman for the Kansas City Chiefs
- Ken Gorgal, halfback for the Green Bay Packers
- Charles F. Gunther, inventor of the caramel
- J. A. Happ, baseball pitcher for the St. Louis Cardinals
- Wilhelmina Kott, oldest person ever from Illinois; born in Peru
- Donold Lourie, businessman, government official, and college football player
- Thomas Lynch, pitcher for the 19th-century Chicago White Stockings; born in Peru
- Russ Meyer, pitcher for six Major League Baseball teams
- Esther Hobart Morris, first woman justice of the peace in United States; served in Wyoming
- Maud Powell, born in Peru, violinist and recipient of a Grammy Lifetime Achievement Award
- Thomas E. G. Ransom, Civil War general, lived in Peru
- Howard C. Ryan, chief justice of the Illinois Supreme Court
- William Donald Scherzer, inventor of the Scherzer Rolling Lift Bridges
- Joseph P. Stremlau, farmer and Illinois state legislator
- Stuart Streuver, archaeologist and anthropologist
- Frank Vlastnik, theater and television actor
