= Miró's Chicago =

Sculpture by Joan Miró

- Artist: Joan Miró
- Year: 1981
- Type: Mixed media sculpture
- Dimensions: 12 m (39 ft)
- Location: Brunswick Plaza, Chicago; 41.88306°N 87.63037°W

Miró's Chicago (officially titled The Sun, the Moon and One Star) is a sculpture by Joan Miró in Brunswick Plaza, Chicago, United States. It is 39 feet (12 m) tall, and is made of steel, wire mesh, concrete, bronze, and ceramic tile.

== History ==
The sculpture is located in small plaza named "Brunswick Plaza" located outside of the Cook County Administration Building (originally known as the "Brunswick Building"). Architect Bruce Graham had begun talks with Miró about designing a sculpture for its exterior plaza during the early stages of the building's design. In 1965, Graham commissioned Miró to work on designing ta sculpture for the building's plaza. This was the first large-scale public sculpture Miro had designed. In 1969, the Brunswick Corporation further-commissioned Miró to design the sculpture, but they decided not to proceed with its construction due to costs. The original bronze model of Miró's Chicago is currently in the collection of the Milwaukee Art Museum.

Chicago Mayor Jane Byrne reached an agreement in which the city would provide funds for the sculpture's construction conditional upon 50% of funding being provided by other contributors. Sufficient funding commitments were secured from several institutions, foundations and individuals, and construction was begun. Miró reduced the cost of its construction donating his design to the city, with the names of the contributors included in the specification. Miró donated his design to leave the sculpture as a gift to the residents of Chicago. The City of Chicago ultimately contributed $250,000, and the majority funding came from the other donors. One of the donors was the SOM Foundation (connected the architecture firm Skidmore, Owings, and Merrill, which designed the Brunswick Building). The completed sculpture was unveiled on April 20, 1981, which was Miro's eighty-eighth birthday. A grand unveiling ceremony had been organized by Mayor Byrne that would have included a performance by the Chicago Symphony Orchestra, but windy weather that day led to a scaling-back of the festivities at the unveiling to a more understated event with a brief speech by Byrne.

== Description ==
Lunchtime view

Bronze model (1967, Milwaukee Art Museum)

The sculpture is officially titled The Sun, the Moon, and One Star, but is best-known as Miró's Chicago or, alternatively, as Miss Chicago. The sculpture is 39 feet (12 m) tall, and is made of steel, wire mesh, concrete, bronze, and ceramic tile. Bronze and concrete are he primary finishes of the sculpture, with colorful ceramic tiling being used merely for accents. The sculpture rises from atop a 22 in (560 mm) stone-clad base.

The abstract sculpture depicts the shape of a woman in a pose with outstretched arms. The depiction of features on the sculpture are simplified, and the sculpture's head is topped with a crown-like fork-shape ornament.

John Greenfield of Streetsblog Chicago has described the sculpture as looking, "something like a lady in a dress with a fork coming out of her head."

== Location ==
The sculpture is located in Brunswick Plaza, situated between the Cook County Administration Building and the Chicago Temple Building in the downtown Loop community area of Chicago, Illinois. This location is directly south of the Daley Center across Washington Street, and is nearly directly-south of Daley Plaza's the untitled 1967 sculpture by Pablo Picasso Miró's Chicago is regarded as a companion of sorts to the Chicago Picasso. Brunswick Plaza was envisioned by the architects of the former Brunswick Building as being as a compliment to Daley Plaza, and the construction of Miró’s sculpture completed this original vision.

Since Brunswuck Plaza is a small and regularly shade-covered plaza located between two skyscrapers, Miró’s sculpture has always been less prominent within the surrounding streetscape than the Chicago Picasso. John Greenfield of Streetsblog Chicago wrote in 2015 that while the work is "one of Chicago's most beloved public sculptures" even though "less-than-stellar" location in Brunswick Plaza renders it "inconspicuous". Greenfield described Brunswick Plaza as, "a dark nook sandwiched between the Cook County Administration Building and the Chicago Temple Building".

In 2015, the Chicago Department of Transportation (CDOT) constructed a 14 ft (4.3 m) tall bus shelter on the sidewalk in front of Brunswick Plaza for the Chicago Transit Authority's Loop Link bus service. This garnered for obstructing views of the sculpture. In response to these concerns, a CDOT spokesperson explained that site constraints left no alternatives for locating a bus platform on that particular block of Washington Avenue. CDOT pledged to also install lighting to illuminate the sculpture at night, would remove trees that were already partially-obstructing the sculpture, would also install signage on the bus platform drawing riders' attention to the sculpture and providing them with information both about Miró’s sculpture and the artwork at Daley Plaza across the street. CDOT also pledged to re-pave the sidewalk in-front of Brunswick Plaza to visually-extend the plaza, and to direct pedestrian attention towards Brunswick Plaza and its sculpture.
