= First United Methodist Church of Chicago =

Church in Chicago, Illinois

- First United Methodist Church of Chicago
- Location: Chicago, Illinois
- Country: United States
- Denomination: United Methodist Church
- Website: chicagotemple.org

History
- Founded: 1831

First United Methodist Church at the Chicago Temple is a Methodist church located at the base and in the top floors of the Chicago Temple Building, a skyscraper in Chicago, Illinois. The top of the building is at a height of 568 feet (173 m). It is affiliated with the United Methodist Church.

== History ==
Main sanctuary

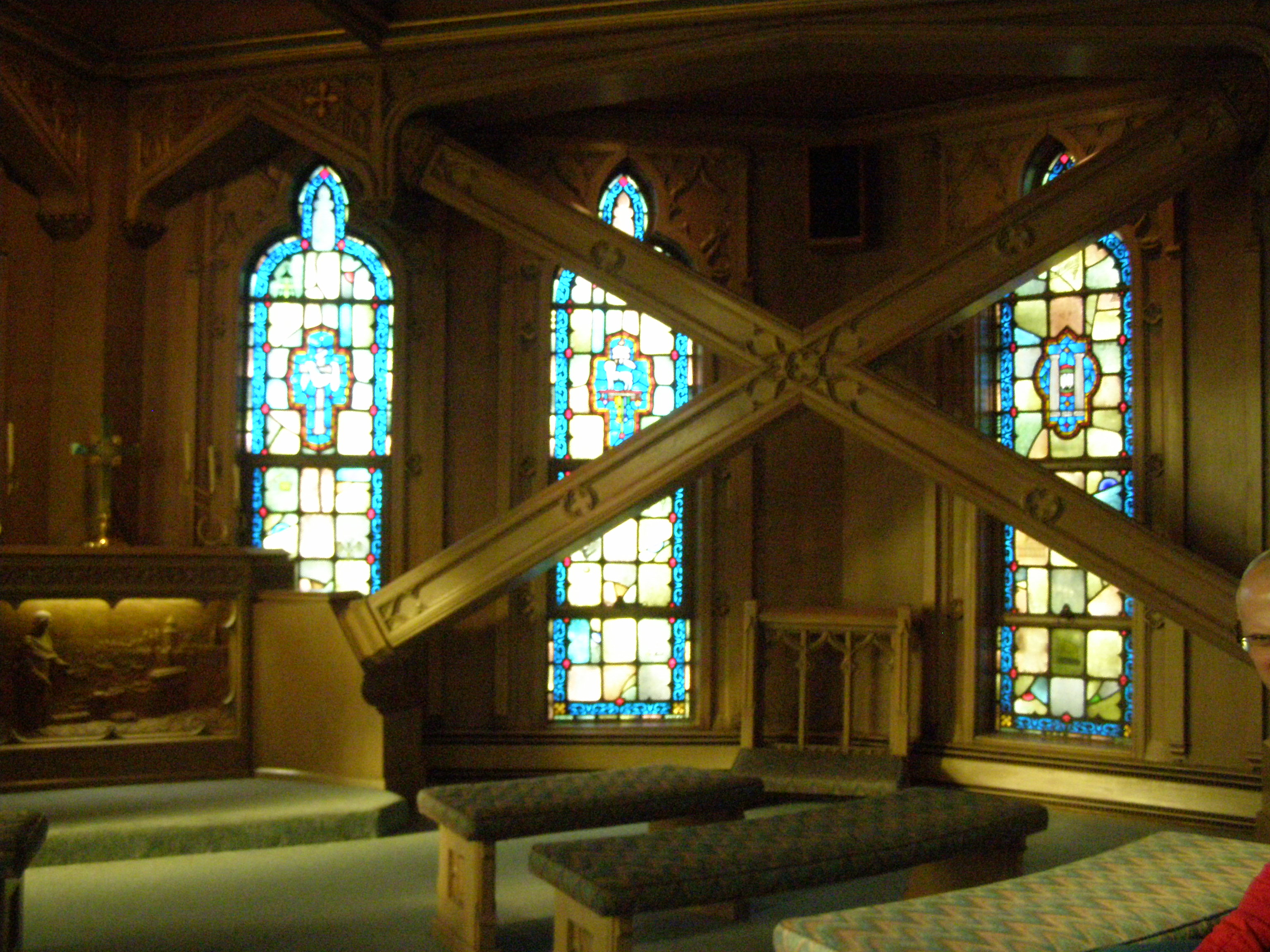
Sky Chapel

The congregation was founded in 1831 and built a log cabin on the north bank of the Chicago River in 1834. In 1838, it moved the cabin across the river to the corner of Washington and Clark Streets. The current structure was completed after a debate within the congregation whether the church should remain in central Chicago or sell its valuable property and relocate to the growing suburban areas.

== Chicago Temple Building ==
Chicago Temple Building
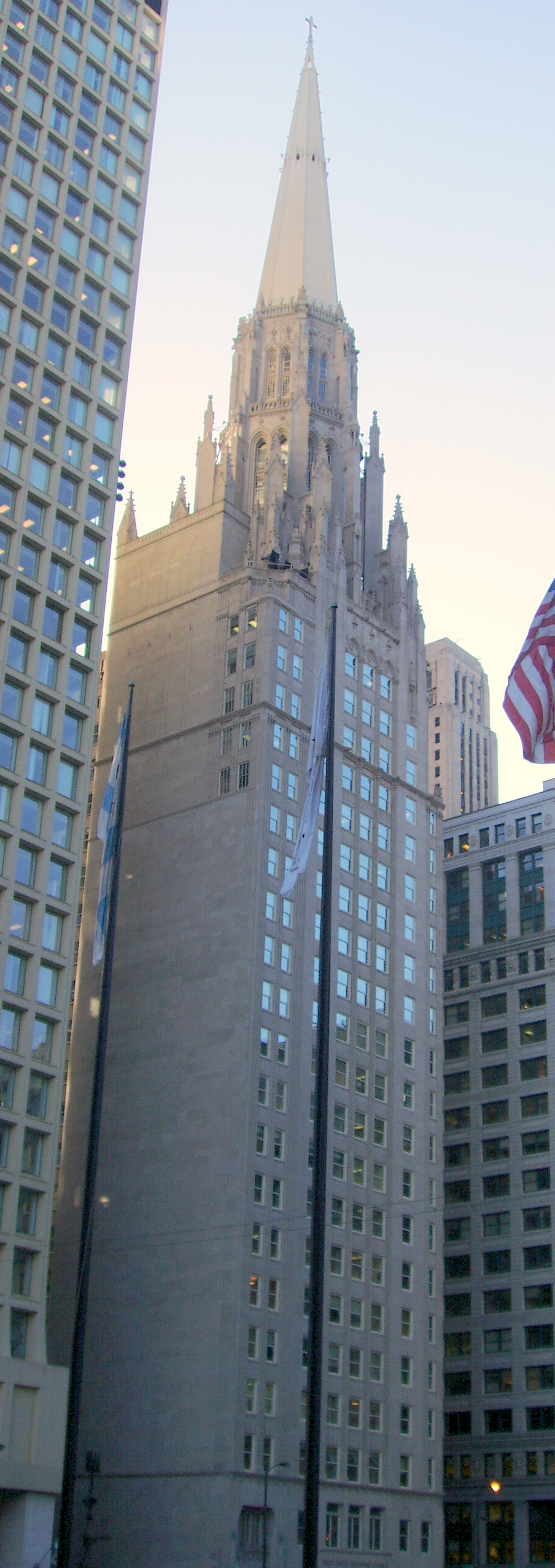

General information
- Architectural style: Chicago school, Gothic Revival architecture (tower)
- Location: Chicago, Illinois, United States
- Coordinates: 41.8830°N 87.6306°W
- Construction started: 1923
- Completed: 1924

Height
- Roof: 568 ft (173 m)

Technical details
- Floor count: 23

Design and construction
- Architect: Holabird & Roche

The Chicago Temple Building is a 568-foot (173 m) tall skyscraper church located at 77 W. Washington Street in Chicago, Illinois, United States. It is home to the congregation of the First United Methodist Church of Chicago. It was completed in 1924 and has 23 floors dedicated to religious and office use. It is by one measure the tallest church building in the world based on the distance from the church's street level entrance to the top of the church's spire or steeple. Although by stipulating that a church building's usage be entirely or almost entirely devoted to religious purposes, then, by that standard, Barcelona's Sagrada Família is the tallest church in the world.

It was the tallest building in Chicago from 1924 until 1930, when it was surpassed by the Chicago Board of Trade Building. This claim included the height of the steeple to maintain the title over the 35 East Wacker Building which opened in 1927.

The building is constructed on a steel frame faced with limestone and is designed in the neo-Gothic style by the firm of Holabird & Roche. During planning and construction, the building was called City Temple, however by the time of completion, the name was changed to Chicago Temple.

The building houses three sanctuaries:

- Sanctuary 1 is four stories tall on the ground floor with seating available for 1,000 people.
- Sanctuary 2 is also known as the "Dixon Chapel" and is on the second floor.
- Sanctuary 3 also known as the "Sky Chapel" is the smallest sanctuary and is situated at the base of the steeple with seating for 30 people.

The Sky Chapel was created in 1952 as a gift from the Walgreen family in memory of Charles Walgreen, the founder of the eponymous pharmacy chain. At 400 ft (120 m) above ground level, it is considered the world's highest worship space and contains 16 stained glass windows. Four depict scenes from the Old Testament, four from the life of Jesus, four represent the history of the Christian Church in the Old World, and the final four the church in the New World. The carved wood altar-front depicts Jesus looking over the city of Chicago (specifically a view from the top of the church building in 1952), mirroring the front of the sanctuary altar, which shows Jesus looking over Jerusalem.

The Chicago Temple is home to an E.M. Skinner organ, Opus 414, which contains 5,589 pipes across seven divisions, four manuals, 73 stops, 93 registers and 92 ranks, and was designed to fit the sanctuary. It was completed in 1923 and was the gift of banker Albert Harris. To mark the centennial of the building, a $3.25 million fundraising campaign seeks to restore Opus 414 to full working order.

Floors 4 through 21 of the building are rented office space with one residential area which is used by the Methodist church's senior pastor as a parsonage, occupying the three floors of the spire, just below the Sky Chapel. The sixth floor of the building once held the office of Clarence Darrow, the famous trial attorney.

A fictionalized version of the building is one of the settings in Charles Merrill Smith's Father Randollph detective series, where the title character is the senior pastor resident in the skyscraper's parsonage.

The temple is located at the southeast corner of Clark and Washington Street across from the Richard J. Daley Center which houses offices for the city of Chicago and Cook County courts and the Chicago Picasso. Due to its proximity to the Cook County and US District Courts, the majority of the building's tenants are attorney's firms. The Northern Illinois Conference and the General Commission on the Status and Role of Women are also tenants. A sculpture entitled Miró's Chicago by Joan Miró occupies a courtyard between the Chicago Temple and the adjacent Cook County Administration Building

== Beliefs ==
=== Marriage ===
The church has an inclusive vision and celebrates both opposite-sex marriages and same-sex marriages.

== See also ==
- List of tallest buildings in Chicago
- Court Street Methodist Church, Janesville, Wisconsin, another church/commercial building combination

Records
| Preceded by Philadelphia City Hall | Tallest building in the United States outside of New York City; 1924–1927; 173 m | Succeeded by Terminal Tower |
