= Joseph P. Stremlau =

American farmer, businessman, and politician

Member of the Illinois House of Representatives

Personal details
- Party: Democratic

Joseph P. Stremlau (March 24, 1892–September 26, 1970) was an American farmer, businessman, and politician.

Stremlau was born in Peru, Illinois and went to the parochial schools. He lived with his wife and family on a farm near Mendota, Illinois. He was involved with the Peterstown Farmers Elevator Company and served as the manager. He also served as a deputy sheriff for LaSalle County, Illinois and also worked for The Illinois Oil Inspection Division. Stremlau worked a deputy collector for the Bureau of Internal Revenue of the United States Treasury Department. Stremlau was involved with the farmers union and was a Democrat. He served in the Illinois House of Representatives from 1949 to 1967. Stremlau died in Mendota, Illinois.
