= Chicago 21 Plan =

1973 development plan in Chicago, Illinois, US

The Chicago 21 Plan was a comprehensive development plan released in 1973 intended to revitalize the areas surrounding the Chicago Loop, Chicago's central business district. The 125-page document, subtitled "A Plan for the Central Area Communities" was published by the Chicago 21 Corporation, which was made up of members of the Chicago Central Area Committee (CCAC), founded by some of Chicago's most influential business and civic leaders.

The cornerstone of the Chicago 21 Plan was the proposed creation of a new residential neighborhood in the 600 acres (2.4 km^{2}) of unused railroad yard bordered by the Loop to its north and the Chicago River to its west. The CCAC and Chicago's business and civic leaders praised the Chicago 21 Plan as a bold initiative to stave off middle-class white flight to the surrounding suburbs and revitalize a city hit hard by declines in manufacturing and industrial employment following World War II.

Opponents of Chicago 21, however, charged the CCAC with trying to create a fortress-like moat around the important Loop businesses, pushing the poorer residents of the central-areas to outlying neighborhoods. These low-income residents created the Coalition of Central Area Communities to fight for a community voice in the planning process. Spurned in their efforts, they eventually changed their name to the Coalition to Stop Chicago 21. Over the following decades, the CCAC played a powerful role in Chicago's real estate development, while representatives of low-income members of central area communities (Pilsen and Cabrini–Green), asked for a louder voice in the planning process.

== Historical context ==
When Richard J. Daley was elected mayor of Chicago in 1955, he inherited a city dealing with the issues facing many urban American centers – mainly a decline in manufacturing and industrial jobs and the exodus of middle-class white residents to the outlying suburbs. This "white flight" was prevalent especially in Chicago's West Town neighborhood, where the white population decreased from 98% to 55% from 1960 to 1980. Daley focused his efforts on revitalizing the downtown areas. In 1958, the Department of City Planning issued the Development Plan for the Central Area of Chicago. The plan called for a University of Illinois campus south of the Loop, the creation of McCormick Place as a convention center and several federal buildings and plazas in the North Loop.

As his term as Mayor progressed, Richard J. Daley's planning and development staff was continuing to create a relationship between City Hall and the downtown business community, mainly the CCAC. The city was losing its manufacturing jobs and this new coalition saw the only way to revitalize Chicago was to cater to commercial growth in the Loop. The consequence of this philosophy was stated by one long-time journalist as "Mayor Daley was totally focused on the downtown; he was so focused that Chicago's neighborhoods went to hell."

Cautious of the feelings of many in the city's white population about racial mixing, the majority of the public housing built between 1946 and 1976 was contained in the 6-mile (9.7 km) square area of the South Loop which was almost an exclusively African-American neighborhood. "Overcrowding caused living conditions in the black ghetto to deteriorate rapidly during the 1950s and 1960s." Fearing this deteriorating community's proximity to the downtown business district, the CCAC sought for a way to essentially create a moat between the two. Real estate developer Arthur Rubloff was quoted by the Chicago Daily News as saying, "I'll tell you what's wrong with the Loop. It's people's perception of it. And the perception they have about it is one word, B-L-A-C-K. We have a racial problem we haven't been able to solve. The ghetto areas have nothing but rotten slum buildings, nothing at all, and businessmen are afraid to move in, so the blacks come downtown for stores and restaurants." The CCAC decided that the solution lay in the unused rail yards existing just south of the Loop.

== CCAC, the Chicago 21 Plan, and the creation of the Dearborn Park neighborhood ==
Three of Chicago's most influential business leaders, Gordon M. Metcalf, then CEO of Sears, Roebuck and Co., Donald M. Graham, CEO of Continental Illinois National Bank and Trust Co. of Chicago (then the biggest employer in the downtown area) and Thomas G. Ayers, President of Commonwealth Edison Company, were the brain trust behind the idea of turning 600 blighted, abandoned acres of train yards located behind the old Dearborn Station on Polk Street into a mixed-income community of 120,000 people. If the CCAC could develop this land and populate it with the right people, it could essentially "protect" the Loop from the low-income African-American Communities along State Street.

From 1970 to 1973, the CCAC convinced numerous investors to support their plan and together, they created the Chicago 21 Corporation and drafted the Chicago 21 Plan: A Plan for the Central Area Communities, which was made public in 1973. The "21", of course, was in reference to the plan's desire to usher Chicago into the 21st century. The central areas of Chicago would be transformed from a struggling manufacturing center to residencies and office space for downtown companies. Mayor Daley was presented with the Plan and immediately took to the idea – the city would get an up-to-date development plan for the central areas with the built-in support of the business community and they wouldn't have to pay for it. City Hall would not, however, use its bonding power with public money to purchase the land from the railroad, as the Chicago 21 Corp. originally hoped.

Without the city leasing the land to the developers at a low interest rate, the Chicago 21 Corp. would have to use privately raised funds to build their new neighborhood. Now assuming the risk, the burgeoning Dearborn Park neighborhood would have to cater to middle- to upper-income residents. The CCAC knew it could not get public sentiment behind the project without pledging some of the residences to be subsidized for low-income minorities, however the business leaders were privately worried about the so-called "tipping point" of the percentage of African-American residents at which whites would abandon the neighborhood. The CCAC planned to reserve one of the large buildings for low-income public housing, but it would be reserved for senior citizens, as opposed to families.

Over the next 12 years and three subsequent Mayoral administrations, the Dearborn Park development went through various stages of design and finally was built and entirely sold by 1986. Civic and business leaders lauded the development as an ingenious use of land which was wasting away. Millions of dollars in new property tax revenue poured into City Hall. Today, the neighborhood still thrives – Richard J. Daley's son, Richard M. Daley, moved into the South Loop in 1995. Not all Chicagoans, however, were pleased with Dearborn Park, nor the coming tide it signaled in Chicago real estate development.

== The Coalition to Stop Chicago 21 ==
Almost immediately following the publishing of the Chicago 21 Plan, community groups in the near downtown communities began protesting the lack of their input in the planning process. They had almost everything to lose if the central areas were re-developed and almost nothing to gain. Residents in the surrounding neighborhoods were worried that the rising property taxes would price them out of their houses. Many worried their houses would be outright destroyed by re-development, never to be replaced. Residents of nearby Pilsen (Chicago's largest Mexican-American community) complained that the city was using precious public funds for new roads and infrastructure for Dearborn Park as their streets and schools fell into disrepair.

Those in charge of the Chicago 21 Corporation were anxious to have African-American figureheads on the board of directors, African-American real estate agents involved in the sales and African-American contractors participating in the construction. These positions were not given out of a sense of social good, however, but to avoid discontent and protest in the Black communities.

Spokespersons from the Pilsen, Cabrini–Green and mostly Hispanic West Town neighborhoods, formed the Coalition of Central Area Communities (later changed to the Coalition to Stop Chicago 21) and protested that Chicago 21 was "proof positive of the city's plan for wholesale displacement of poor people." They accused the Dearborn Park developers of having unofficial quotas on the number of African Americans who would be allowed in the new neighborhood and of intending for the new neighborhood to essentially wall off the African-American residents along State St. They argued that "[t]he main concept of the Chicago 21 Plan was a fortress city. This redevelopment was to create an ever-increasing buffer zone to protect the downtown investments from the growing number of poor and minority people living in Chicago's surrounding neighborhoods."

In his book Global Decisions, Local Collisions: Urban Life in the New World Order author David Ranney argues that, in attempting to appeal to commercial growth, the federal government has cut public housing programs and emphasized privatization. As housing is no longer seen as a social good, but a commodity, there is no incentive for private developers to build housing for the poor. This sentiment was echoed by those protesting the Chicago 21 Plan. A 1978 editorial in the Chicago Defender stated that "If this was a federally funded project, HUD, the Labor Department or some other agency would have descended on the planners with an ultimatum long ago. They cannot here. So who is going to put pressure on the planners? We believe that pressure must be generated from within by the banks, retailers, manufacturers, etc., whose money is in Dearborn Park. They must do it out of a sense of social responsibility."

== Conclusion ==
Starting in the 1950s, Chicago politicians steadfastly believed that the key to the city's economic survival was in revitalizing the central areas surrounding the Loop by luring white, middle- and upper-class professionals into renovated lofts and re-built neighborhoods. City Hall gradually allied themselves with the business community, eventually ceding control of much large-scale planning to private organizations like the CCAC and the Chicago 21 Corporation. Local community organizations have fought these plans since their inception. As developers and planners vow they have the city's best interest at heart, those residents in the central areas charge that they are being driven out of their neighborhoods by new construction and rising property taxes. The CCAC continues to work with City Hall in planning for the future of Chicago's downtown area. Meanwhile, residents in Pilsen, previously Cabrini–Green and many other neighborhoods fight to keep the dwindling number of public housing units available to those that need them.
