= Carl Sandburg Village =

1960s Chicago urban renewal project

Coordinates: 41°54′26″N 87°37′56″W

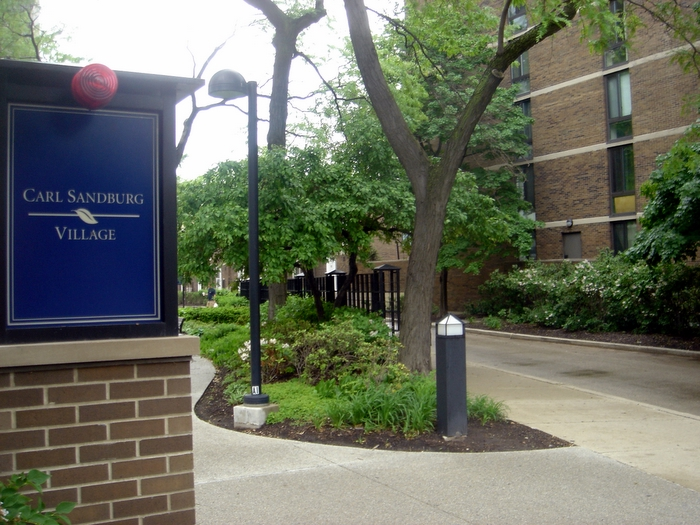
One of the entrances to Carl Sandburg Village.

Carl Sandburg Village is a Chicago urban renewal project of the 1960s in the Near North Side community area of Chicago. It was named in honor of Carl Sandburg. The development was financed by the city of Chicago. It is located between Clark and LaSalle Streets between Division Street and North Avenue. Solomon Cordwell Buenz was its architect.

The development was intended to prevent urban decay from the north from spreading into Chicago's Gold Coast neighborhood. Over 900 Puerto Rican families were displaced from the La Clark neighborhood during the 1950s and 1960s to make way for its construction.

In 1979 Carl Sandburg Village was converted to condominium ownership. While it is no longer as affordable as when built, it is still a relatively reasonably priced housing option within Chicago's very affluent Gold Coast.
