= Elsie Encarnacion =

American politician

Member of the New York City Council from the 8th district
- Incumbent
- Assumed office January 1, 2026
- Preceded by: Diana Ayala

Personal details
- Born: East Harlem, New York, U.S.
- Party: Democratic
- Website: Official website Campaign website

Elsie R. Encarnacion is an American politician who has served on the New York City Council since 2026. A member of the Democratic Party, Encarnacion represents the 8th district.

== Early life ==
Encarnacion was born and raised in East Harlem, Manhattan, and is of Puerto Rican descent.

== Career ==
Encarnacion served on the Manhattan Community Board 11 and as a parent coordinator at a school in the Bronx. She joined city councilmember Melissa Mark-Viverito's office in 2006, where she met Diana Ayala and went on to serve as Ayala's chief of staff.

=== New York City Council ===
With Ayala's support, Encarnacion filed to run for New York City Council's 8th district in 2025. She earned the Working Families Party's first-choice endorsement and benefitted from $100,000 in spending by Affordable New York, a political action committee funded by Airbnb. She won the election.

== Electoral history ==
=== 2025 ===
2025 New York City Council Democratic primary, 8th district
Party	Candidate	Maximum round	Maximum votes	Share in maximum round	Maximum votes First round votes Transfer votes
Democratic	Elsie Encarnacion	7	6,689	58.6%	
Democratic	Wilfredo Lopez	7	4,718	41.4%	
Democratic	Clarisa M. Alayeto	6	3,101	24.1%	
Democratic	Raymond Santana	5	2,514	18.2%	
Democratic	Rosa G. Diaz	4	1,821	12.6%	
Democratic	Federico Colon	3	1,376	9.1%	
Democratic	Nicholas A. Reyes	2	1,097	7.1%	
Write-In		1	86	0.6%	

2025 New York City Council election, 8th district
Party	Candidate	Votes	%
Democratic	Elsie Encarnacion	20,972	72.0
Working Families	Elsie Encarnacion	3,681	12.6
Total	Elsie Encarnacion	24,653	84.7
Republican	Tyreek Goodman	3,025	10.4
Conservative	Tyreek Goodman	461	1.6
Total	Tyreek Goodman	3,486	12.0
The Unity	Federico Colon	909	3.1
Write-in		70	0.2
Total votes		29,118	100.0
Democratic hold			
