= Lillian Wald Houses =

Public housing development in Manhattan, New York

- NYCHA property
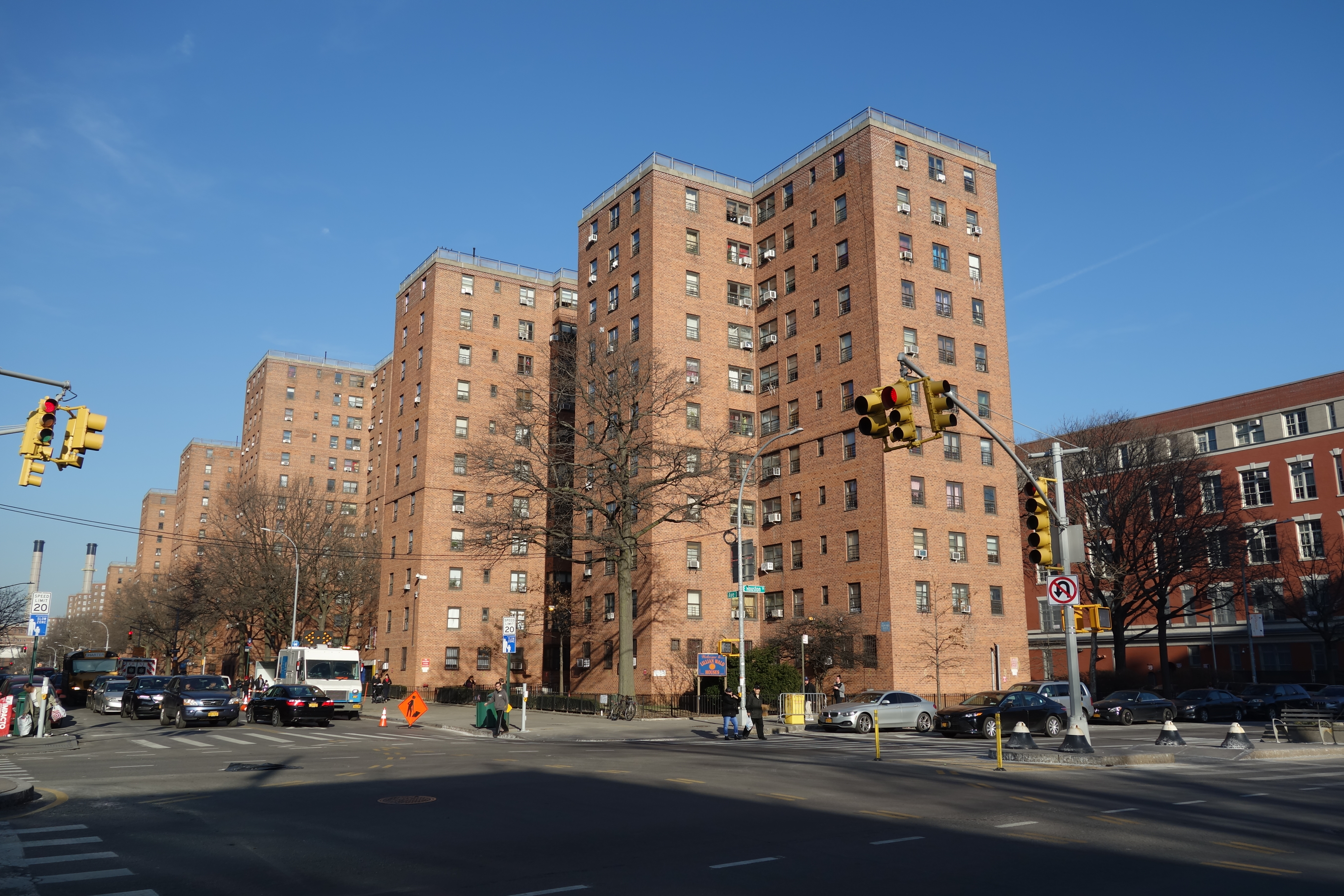
- Wald Houses in 2019 on Avenue D
- Interactive map of Lillian Wald Houses
- Coordinates: 40.721°N 73.9763°W
- Country: United States
- State: New York
- City: New York City
- Borough: Manhattan

Area
  - Total: 0.026 sq mi (0.067 km^{2})

Population
  - Total: 3,757
  - Density: 140,000/sq mi (56,000/km^{2})
- Zip codes: 10002, 10009
- Area codes: 212, 332, 646, and 917

The Lillian Wald Houses are a NYCHA housing project in the Alphabet City neighborhood of Manhattan with 16 buildings that honor the housing advocate of the same name. The housing complex is bordered on the north by East Sixth Street, on the south by East Houston Street, on the east by the FDR Drive, and on the west by Avenue D.

Frederick L. Ackerman and Lafayette A. Goldstone were appointed as the architects of the project. The cornerstone was laid on East Sixth Street and Avenue D in 1947 following a change in state financing laws for which Lillian Wald campaigned. The first tenants began moving into the complex in April 1949 and the housing project was completed in October 1949.

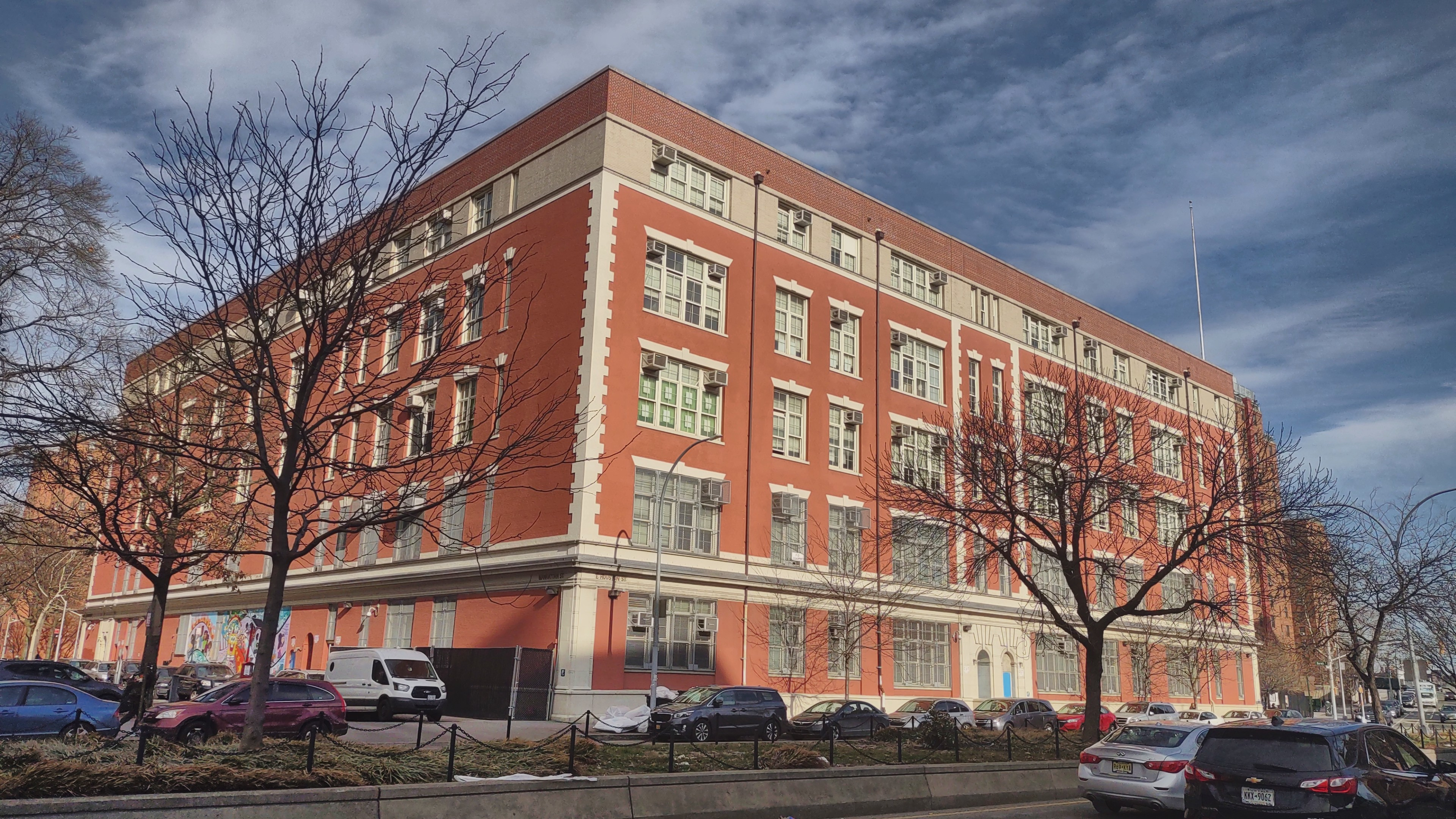
Public School 188 viewed from East Houston Street in 2022

Construction of the Houses led to the end of Manhattan Street, a one-block-long street that previously served as a shortcut between East Third and East Houston Streets and ran along the west side of Public School 188. Manhattan Street, along with the segments of other streets that previously ran through the site, were eliminated from the city map in 1944. Public School 188 was excluded from the site of the housing complex.

== Notable residents ==
- Diana Ayala, politician
- Antonio 'Chico' Garcia, artist

== See also ==
- New York City Housing Authority
