= Construction of the Second Avenue Subway =

History of a New York City Subway line

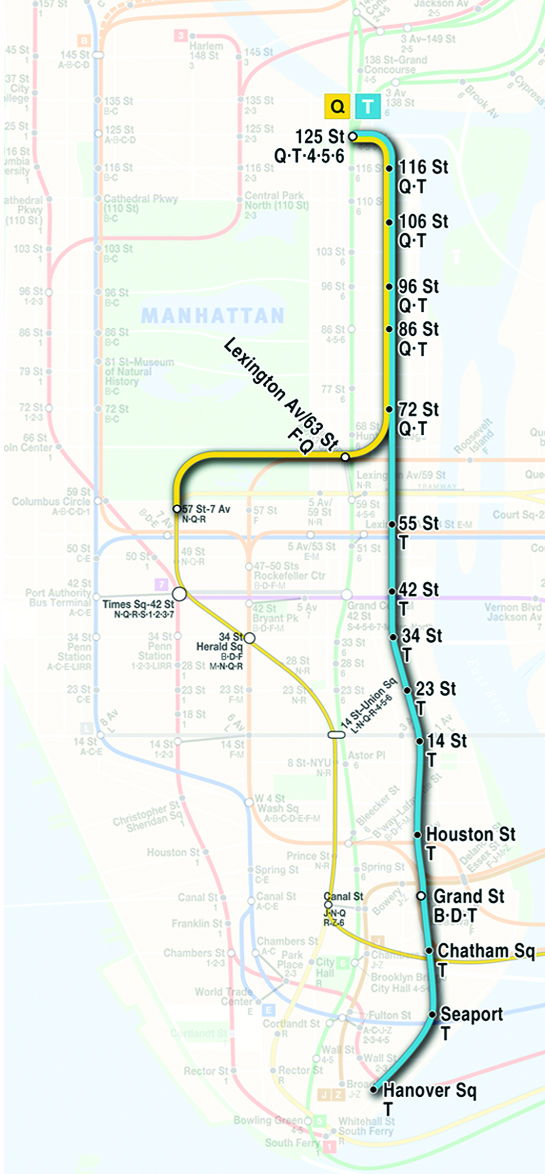
Proposed map of the most current plan for the Second Avenue Subway, which started construction in 2007

The Second Avenue Subway, a New York City Subway line that runs under Second Avenue on the East Side of Manhattan, had been proposed since 1920. The first phase of the line, consisting of three stations on the Upper East Side, started construction in 2007 and opened in 2017, ninety-seven years after the route was first proposed. Up until the 1960s, many distinct plans for the Second Avenue subway line were never carried out, though small segments were built in the 1970s as part of the Program for Action. The complex reasons for these delays are why the line is sometimes called "the line that time forgot".

Work on the line started in 2007 following the development of a financially secure construction plan. The Metropolitan Transportation Authority (MTA) awarded a tunneling contract for the first phase of the project to the consortium of Schiavone/Shea/Skanska (S3) on March 20, 2007. This followed preliminary engineering and a final tunnel design completed by a joint venture between AECOM and Arup. Parsons Brinckerhoff served as the Construction Manager of the project. A full funding grant agreement with the Federal Transit Administration for the first phase of the project was received in November 2007. A ceremonial ground-breaking for the Second Avenue Subway was held on April 12, 2007. The first phase of the line, consisting of three newly built stations and two miles (3.2 km) of tunnel, cost $4.45 billion. A 1.5-mile (2.4 km), $6 billion second phase is in development.

== Early attempts ==
In response to a surge in the New York City Subway's ridership, in 1919, the New York Public Service Commission launched a study to determine what improvements were needed in the city's public transport system. The study called for, among other things, a massive trunk line under Second Avenue consisting of at least six tracks and numerous branches throughout Brooklyn, Queens, and the Bronx. In September 1929, the Board of Transportation of the City of New York (BOT) tentatively approved the expansion, but the soaring costs of the expansion became unmanageable, and the plan was scaled down. A second plan, proposed in 1939, called for a two-track line with extensions into the Bronx and Brooklyn. The line was again delayed by World War II, even as the Second Avenue Elevated was closed without being replaced. The elevated line's closure, as well as a corresponding increase in the East Side's population, increased the need for a Second Avenue subway.

Further plans were proposed in 1944 and in 1947. The BOT then ordered ten new prototype subway cars specifically for the unbuilt subway line. In 1950, a revised plan involved connections from Queens. New York voters approved a bond measure for its construction in 1951, but the Korean War again forced the postponement of plans. The Third Avenue Elevated, the only other elevated line in the area, closed on May 13, 1955, making the Lexington Avenue Line the only subway transportation option on the East Side of Manhattan. As the early 1960s progressed, the East Side experienced an increase in development, and the Lexington Avenue Line became overcrowded.

In 1967, voters approved a bond issue, which provided funding for projects such as the Program for Action. The program proposed a Second Avenue line to be built in two phases: a first phase north of 34th Street and a second phase south of there. The Second Avenue project, for a line from 34th Street to the Bronx, was given top priority. Construction on a tunnel segment between 99th and 105th Streets began in October 1972. A second segment between 110th and 120th Street in East Harlem started construction in March 1973. In October 1973, the line's Chinatown segment began construction at Canal Street under the foot of the Manhattan Bridge between Canal and Division Streets. A fourth segment started construction in July 1974, between Second and Ninth Streets in the East Village. The city soon experienced its most dire fiscal crisis yet, due to the stagnant economy of the early 1970s, combined with the massive outflow of city residents to the suburbs. New York City mayor Abraham Beame issued a stop-work order for the line in September 1975, and the tunnels were sealed. In 1978, State Comptroller Arthur Levitt stated that there were no plans to finish the line.

== 1995–2017: Planning ==
With the city's economic and budgetary recovery in the 1990s, there was a revival of efforts to complete construction of the Second Avenue Subway. Rising ridership on the IRT Lexington Avenue Line, the only subway trunk line east of Central Park, demonstrated the need for the Second Avenue Line, as capacity and safety concerns rose. The four-track IRT Lexington Avenue Line, the lone rapid transit option on the Upper East Side and East Harlem since the 1955 closure of the Third Avenue elevated, is the most crowded subway line in the country. The line saw an average of 1.3 million daily riders in 2015. This is more than the daily ridership of the entire Washington Metro system, which has the second-highest ridership in the U.S., as well as greater than the combined riderships of the rail transit systems of San Francisco and Boston. Local bus routes are just as crowded during various times of the day, with the M15 local and Select Bus Service routes, which run on Second Avenue, seeing a combined annual ridership of 14.5 million or a daily ridership of about 46,029.

The construction of the Second Avenue line would add two tracks to fill the gap that has existed since the elevated Second and Third Avenue Lines were demolished in the 1950s. It would also be the largest expansion of the New York City Subway since the 1960s. According to the line's final environmental impact statement, the catchment area of the line's first phase would include 200,000 daily riders.

=== Planning begins ===
In 1991, during the then-New York Governor Mario Cuomo administration, $22 million was allocated to renew planning and design efforts for the Second Avenue line. Construction would not begin until at least 1997. However, the MTA removed these funds from its capital budget two years later, as it was facing budget cuts. In 1995, the MTA began its Manhattan East Side Alternatives (MESA) study, both a Major Investment Study (MIS) and a Draft Environmental Impact Statement (DEIS), seeking ways to alleviate overcrowding on the Lexington Avenue Line and improve mobility on Manhattan's East Side. The study analyzed several alternatives, such as improvements to the Lexington Avenue Line to increase capacity, enhanced bus service with dedicated lanes, and light rail or ferry service on the East Side.

The favored alternative, build alternative 1, included a subway running down Second Avenue from 125th Street in Harlem to the existing Lexington Avenue–63rd Street station with provisions for expansion to the Bronx and to Lower Manhattan. Second Avenue was chosen over Third Avenue, because Third Avenue was too close to the Lexington Avenue Line, as well as having significant property impacts, increased construction complexity and cost, and increased travel times resulting from slower operating speeds. Second Avenue was chosen over First Avenue, because it would be too difficult to construct near the Queensboro Bridge, the United Nations and the Queens-Midtown Tunnel.

The MTA started the Lower Manhattan Access Study (LMA) in November 1997 in order to determine the best new transport connections to the New York City suburbs. The construction of the Second Avenue Subway from 63rd Street to Lower Manhattan was one of the five build alternatives developed by the study.

=== 1999 Draft Environmental Impact Statement ===
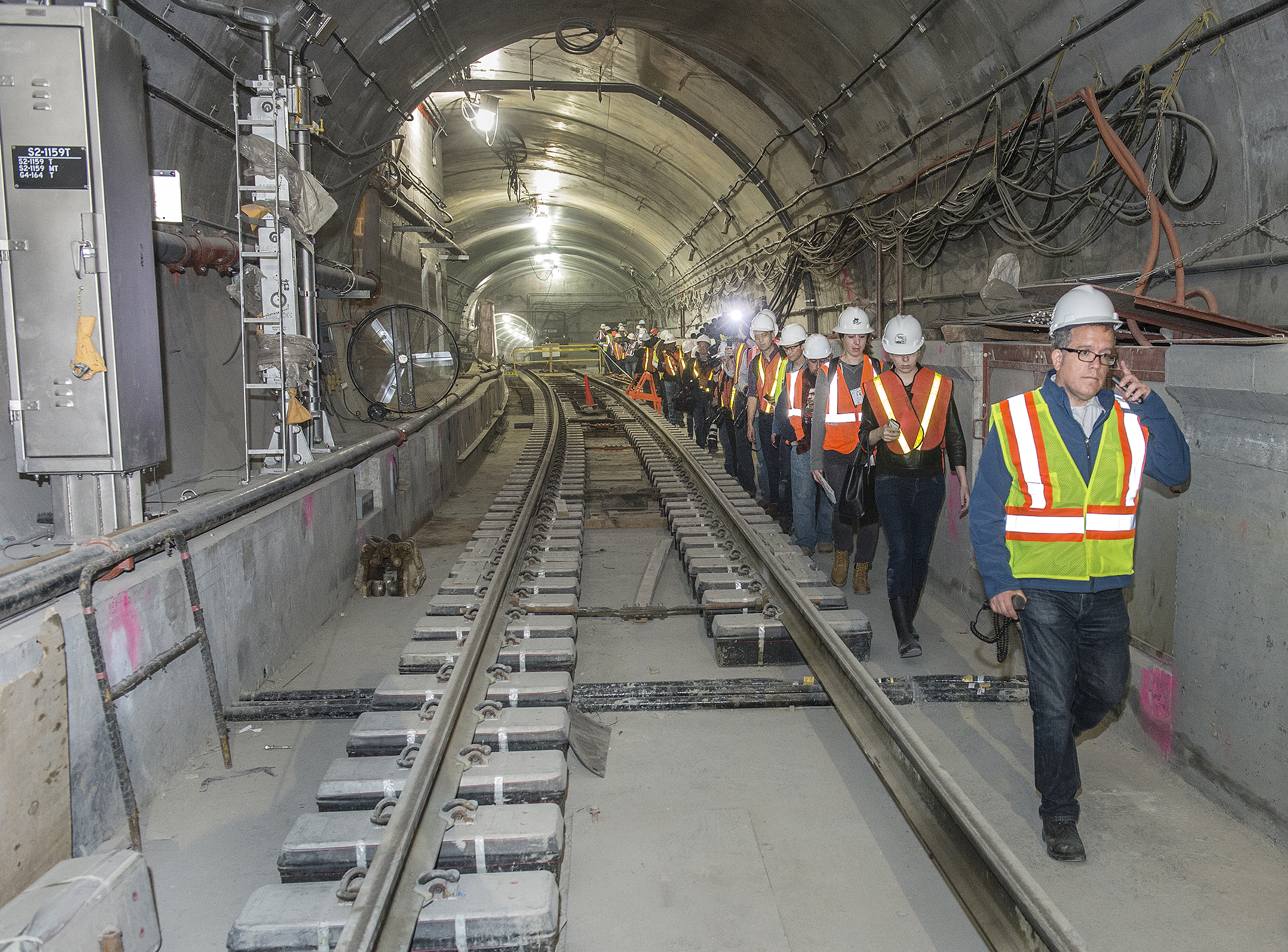
The track junction with the BMT 63rd Street Line south of 72nd Street

The 1999 Draft Environmental Impact Statement only proposed new subway service from 63rd Street north up Second Avenue to 125th Street via the Broadway Line to Lower Manhattan. All trains would have been routed down the Broadway Line express tracks, which are the only tracks on the Broadway Line which connect to the 63rd Street Line. In order to provide access to Lower Manhattan, and to allow for congestion reduction on the Lexington Avenue Line, the "Canal Street Flip" was proposed. As built, the tracks at Canal Street are set up so that the local tracks continue into the Financial District and then enter Brooklyn through the Montague Street Tunnel, while the express tracks continue to Brooklyn directly, crossing the Manhattan Bridge. The "Canal Street Flip" would have flipped the local and express tracks at Canal Street, having local trains run via the Manhattan Bridge, and in turn having the express trains continue south on the Broadway Line through Lower Manhattan and through the Montague Street Tunnel into Brooklyn. To construct the "Flip" 3,450 feet (1,050 m) of track would have been reconstructed, the two side platforms would have been widened, columns would have been relocated, and two new switches would have been installed. Once the construction of full-length Second Avenue Subway was approved, this option was discarded.

The service plan with the "Canal Street Flip," according to the December 1998 "Manhattan East Side Transit Alternative Study," would have had R trains run via the Second Avenue line, which was only planned to run from 63rd Street to 125th Street. R trains would become the Broadway express under this plan, using the BMT 63rd Street Line to access the Second Avenue line and continuing to 125th Street. The service would have operated 25 trains per hour (tph) between 125th Street and City Hall, 20 tph between City Hall and Whitehall Street, and 10 tph between Whitehall Street and Bay Ridge–95th Street via the Montague Street Tunnel. A reconstruction of a junction near Canal Street, called the "Canal Flip," would have provided a direct connection between the express tracks of the Broadway Line and Lower Manhattan, allowing the route to operate. To allow R trains to short-turn at City Hall, the station's unused lower level would have been reactivated, requiring upgrades for the platforms and tracks, including their lengthening, in addition to the installation of tail tracks. During construction, the station's upper level would have had to be underpinned. To replace the R on Queens Boulevard, a Broadway Local T route (distinct from the currently proposed Second Avenue Local T route) would have been created, running between Continental Avenue and Bay Parkway via Broadway local and the Manhattan Bridge. The "Canal Street Flip" would have provided a direct connection between the local tracks and the Manhattan Bridge. The N, which ran local on Broadway, would have been rerouted from the Montague Street Tunnel to the Manhattan Bridge.

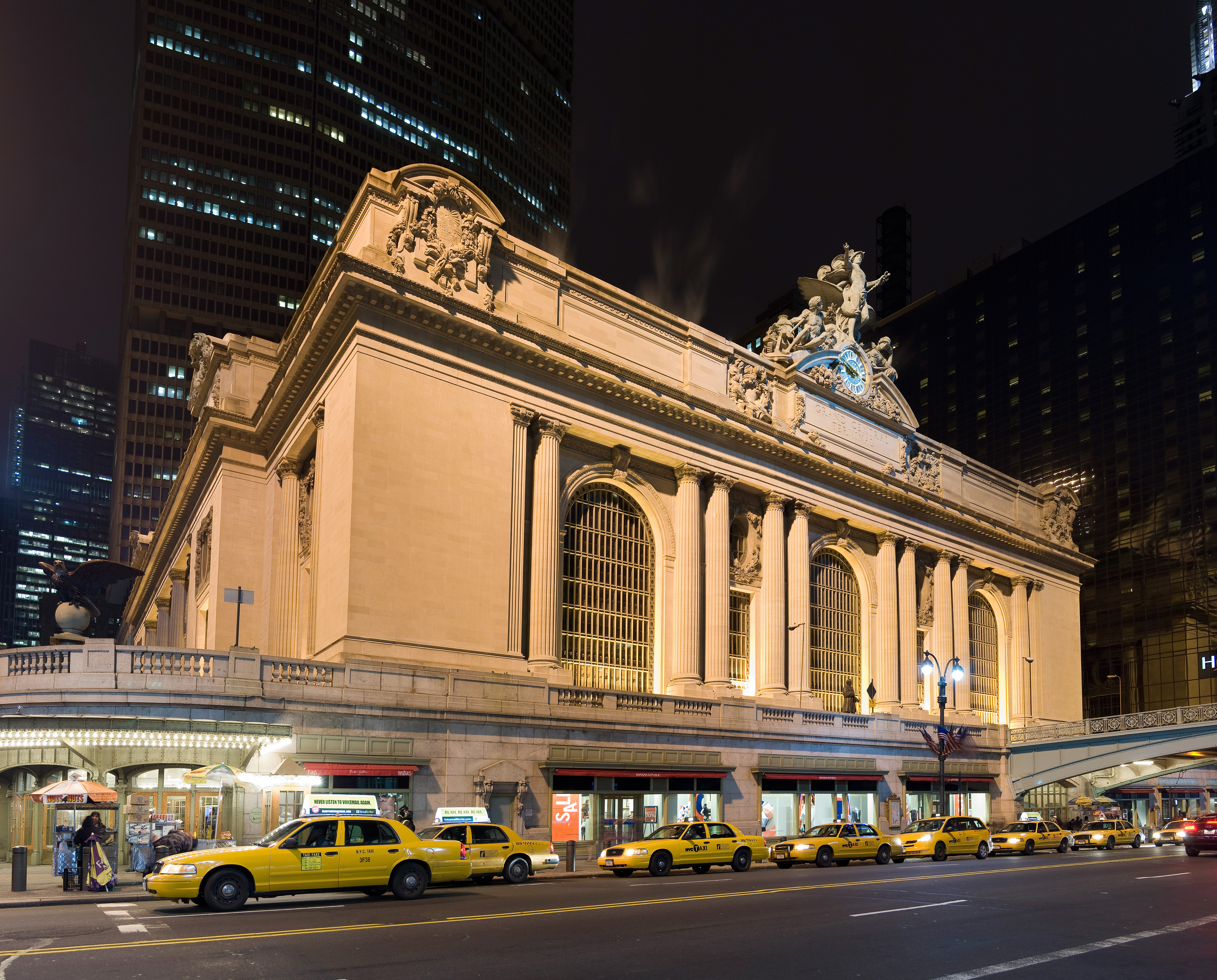
Initial plans called for a spur from the Second Avenue Subway to Grand Central Terminal via 44th Street.

Initially, a spur to Grand Central Terminal was considered, which would have run via 44th Street as a way to divert riders from the 4 and 5 routes, which run express on the Lexington Avenue Line. Service on this spur could not be as frequent as that on Lexington Avenue as there would not be enough capacity on Second Avenue, and as a result this plan was dropped.

South of 14th Street, there were two possible options to decide between. Option A would continue the subway beneath Chrystie Street, St. James Place and Water Street to a terminal in Lower Manhattan. Option B would connect the new subway to the existing Nassau Street Loop tracks J1 and J2 at Kenmare Street to provide access to Lower Manhattan. This option has been proposed as part of plans for the Second Avenue Subway from the 1940s and 1950s. Cross-platform transfers would be available at Canal Street and Chambers Street to the Nassau Street Line routes. It would allow Second Avenue trains to have access to Brooklyn using the underutilized Montague Street Tunnel. This option would have a lower cost than the Water Street option as less tunnel would need to be constructed. The Nassau option would attract more riders to the subway system because of additional service to Brooklyn, but the Water Street option would provide greater coverage in Manhattan and would be better at relieving congestion on the Lexington Avenue Line. Because the platforms on the BMT Eastern Division are shorter than those on the rest of the B Division, those on the Nassau Street Line south of Chambers Street would have to be lengthened by about 120 feet (37 m), to a total of 615 feet (187 m).The tracks would have to be reconfigured, the passenger circulation capacity would have to be increased, and the service plan south of Chambers Street would have to be modified, to provide sufficient capacity to accommodate the additional trains that Second Avenue Subway service would require. The Nassau Street Line connection would have run through a new tunnel that first turns to the east to align under Forsyth Street before turning west and joining the Nassau Street Line along Kenmare Street.

The Water Street option was chosen even though it would cost $360 million more because of the additional benefits it would provide. The Nassau Street option would have required the reorganization of the existing services on the Nassau Street Line, and passengers entering via the Williamsburg Bridge would not have direct service to destinations in other parts of Brooklyn. Additionally, over a period between two and three years long, service on the Nassau Street Line would have been required to be shut down during late nights and/or weekend hours. The Nassau Street option would not have the capacity for future Queens service via the 63rd Street Tunnel.

Originally, the 125th Street station was to have been constructed parallel to the Lexington Avenue Line, curving below private property to join Second Avenue at 115th Street. This option was favored as it would have allowed an eventual extension of the Second Avenue Subway to the Bronx via the IRT Pelham Line, while still providing a transfer at 125th Street to the Lexington Avenue Line. Under this option, 116th Street would not have a station, but because of requests by the local community, the Supplemental Draft Environmental Impact Statement (SDEIS) evaluated the inclusion of this station. The s-curve options were not feasible because of the large curve radius required for efficient and fast subway operation. As a result, the alignment at 125th Street was changed. Instead, the line would continue via Second Avenue until 125th Street, when it would then curve under a small number of private properties before heading west on 125th Street. A future extension to the Bronx would be allowed from Second Avenue as opposed to Lexington Avenue. This alignment also allows for the construction of a storage yard north of 125th Street.

Build alternative two would involve the addition of a separate light rail service between Union Square and Broad Street that would serve the Lower East Side and Lower Manhattan. Other alternatives including building in-fill stations on various lines (including the 63rd Street Line at First Avenue, at First Avenue on the Broadway Line, at First Avenue on the Flushing Line, and Avenue C on the Canarsie Line), building an elevated train line along Second or First Avenues, lengthening the platforms on the Lexington Avenue Line to accommodate twelve-car trains, or connecting the northern part of the Lexington Avenue Line (either the local or express tracks), which would be converted to B Division service, to the Broadway Line. Due in part to strong public support, the MTA Board committed in April 2000 to building a full-length subway line along the East Side, from East Harlem to Lower Manhattan. In May 2000, the MTA Capital Program Review Board approved the MTA's 2000–2004 Capital Program, which allocated $1.05 billion for the construction of the Second Avenue Subway. The next year, a contract for subway design was awarded to DMJM Harris/Arup Joint Venture. On December 19, 2001, the Federal Transit Administration approved the start of preliminary engineering on a full-length Second Avenue Subway.

=== Approval and preparation for construction ===
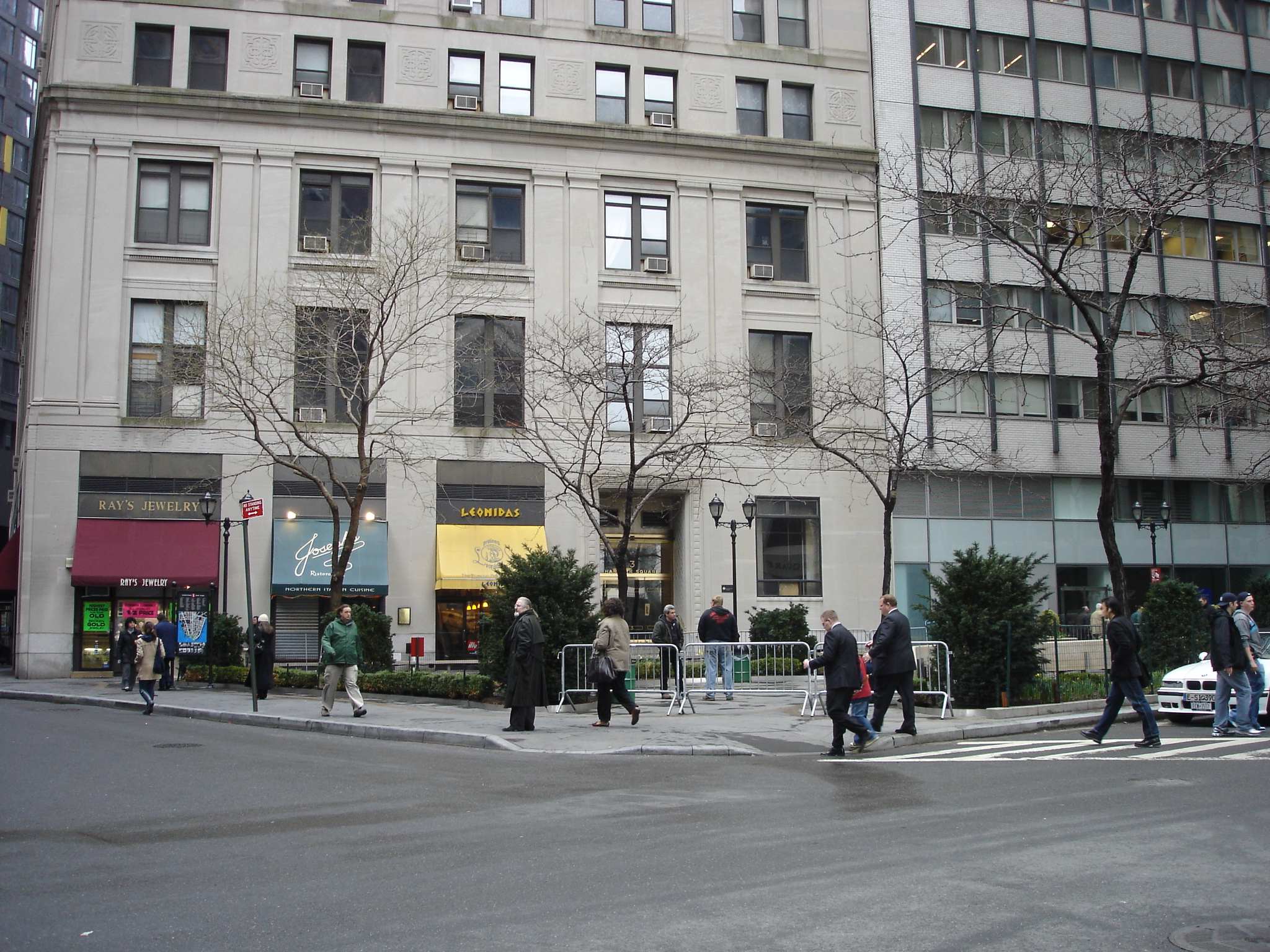
Hanover Square (pictured) was finally chosen as the location of the line's southern terminus.

When Hillary Clinton was running for New York State Senator in 2000, she stated that she supported the construction of multiple major infrastructure projects in New York, such as the Second Avenue Subway, East Side Access, and rail links to LaGuardia and JFK Airports. In 2003, two million dollars in preliminary funding for the subway were provided by Congressmen Maurice Hinchey and John Sweeney. The MTA's final environmental impact statement (FEIS) was approved in April 2004; this latest proposal is for a two-track line from 125th Street and Lexington Avenue in Harlem, down Second Avenue to Hanover Square in the Financial District.

The new subway line was planned to carry two regular services. The full-length Second Avenue line, extending from Harlem to the Financial District, is to be given the color turquoise and the letter designation T. However, the line's other service, the Q route, began carrying passengers first (supplemented by some rush-hour N trains and one rush-hour R train). The MTA plan calls for building the Second Avenue Subway in four segments with connections to other subway lines. The first segment, Phase 1, rerouted the Q along the Broadway Express, via the BMT 63rd Street Line, and north along Second Avenue to the Upper East Side at 96th Street. Phase 2 is planned to extend the Q train to 125th Street and Lexington Avenue. In Phase Three, the new T train will run from 125th Street to Houston Street. The final phase will extend T train service from Houston Street to Hanover Square in Lower Manhattan.

In order to store the 330 additional subway cars needed for the operation of the line, the 36th–38th Street Yard would be reconfigured. In addition, to allow for train storage, alongside the main alignment, there would be storage tracks between 21st Street and 9th Street. The Second Avenue Subway is chained as "S". The track map in the 2004 FEIS showed that all stations, except for Harlem–125th Street, would have two tracks and one island platform. 72nd Street and Harlem–125th Street were conceived as three-track, two-platform stations, but plans for both were scaled back. At 72nd Street, this would have allowed trains from the Broadway Line to reverse without interfering with service on Second Avenue, as well as provided additional operational flexibility that could be used for construction work and non-revenue moves. However, to reduce costs, the 72nd Street station was ultimately constructed with two tracks and one platform. In July 2018, the 125th Street station was also scaled down to a two-track, one-platform station because the MTA had ascertained that two-tracked terminals would be sufficient to handle train capacities, and that building a third track would have caused unnecessary impacts to surrounding buildings.

In August 2006, the MTA revealed that all future subway stations—including stations on the Second Avenue Subway and the 7 Subway Extension, as well as the new South Ferry station—would be outfitted with air-cooling systems to reduce the temperature along platforms by as much as 10 °F (6 °C). In early plans, the Second Avenue Subway was also to have platform screen doors to assist with air-cooling, energy savings, ventilation, and track safety, but this plan was scrapped in 2012 due to costs and operational challenges.

The 2-mile (3.2 km) first phase will be within budget, at $4.45 billion. Its construction site was designated as being from 105th Street and Second Avenue to 63rd Street and Third Avenue. Deep bore tunneling methods were to be used in order to avoid the disruptions for road traffic, pedestrians, utilities and local businesses produced by cut-and-cover methods of past generations. Stations were to retain cut-and-cover construction. The total cost of the 8.5-mile (13.7 km) line is expected to exceed $17 billion. In 2014, MTA Capital Construction President Dr. Michael Horodniceanu stated that the whole line may be completed as early as 2029, and would serve 560,000 daily passengers upon completion; however, as of December 2016, only Phases 1 and 2 would be completed by 2029. The line is described as the New York City Subway's "first major expansion" in more than a half-century. However, its completion is in doubt, with one construction manager saying that the first phase of the project is "four and a half billion dollars for three stations," and that there are fifteen stations that need to be built for the entire line.

== 2007–2017: First phase ==
=== Beginning of construction ===
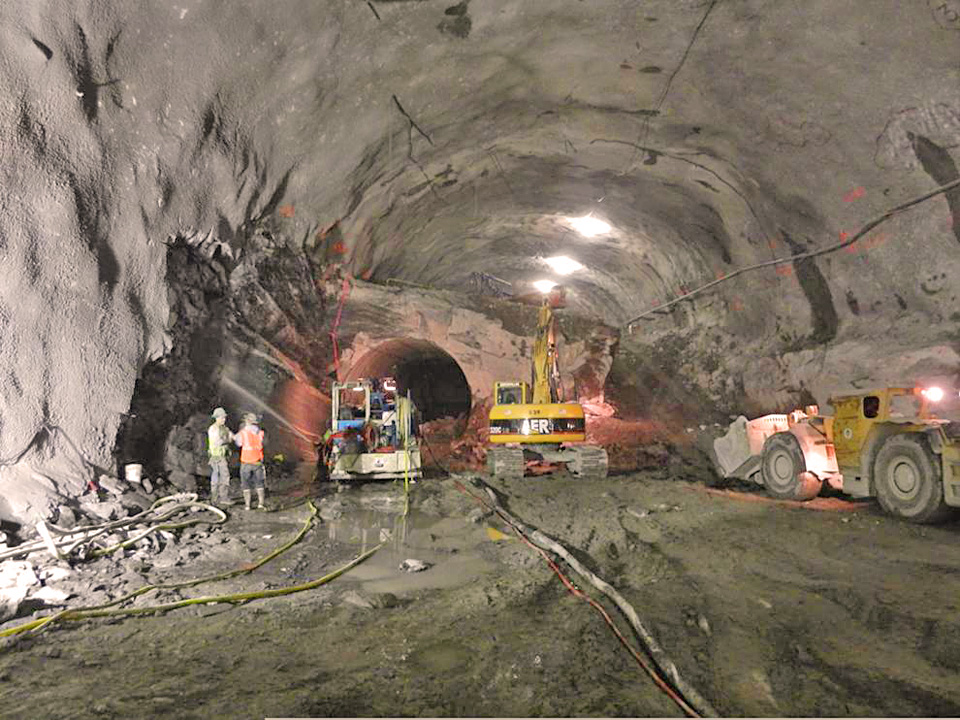
The 72nd Street station cavern in January 2012

Second Avenue Subway plans for Phase 1 were only allowed to proceed because New York voters passed a transportation bond issue on November 8, 2005, allowing for dedicated funding allocated for that phase. Its passage had been seen as critical to its construction, but the bond was passed only by a narrow margin, with 55 percent of voters approving and 45 percent disapproving. After warning that failure to pass the act would doom the project, MTA chairman Peter S. Kalikow stated, "Now it's up to us to complete the job." On December 18, 2006, the U.S. Department of Transportation announced that they would allow the MTA to commit up to $693 million in funds to begin construction of the Second Avenue Subway and that the federal share of such costs would be reimbursed with FTA transit funds, subject to appropriations and final labor certification.

Preliminary engineering and a final tunnel design was completed by a joint venture between AECOM and Arup. The first phase was originally supposed to include a core tunneling section between 62nd and 92nd Streets, as well as a spur from Third Avenue/63rd Street to Second Avenue/65th Street. The 96th Street station cavern, as well as existing tunnels, would allow the first phase's trackage to run from 62nd to 105th Streets. Before construction started, the MTA revised their plans so that the construction of the section between 62nd and 65th Streets was postponed. On March 20, 2007, upon completion of preliminary engineering, the MTA awarded a contract for constructing the tunnels between 92nd and 63rd Streets, a launch box for the tunnel boring machine (TBM) at 92nd to 95th Streets, and access shafts at 69th and 72nd Streets. This contract, valued at $337 million, was awarded to S3, a joint venture of Schiavone Construction, Skanska USA Civil, and J.F. Shea Construction. A ceremonial groundbreaking took place on April 12, 2007, in a tunnel segment built in the 1970s at 99th Street. At the time, it was announced that passengers would be able to ride trains on the new line by the end of 2013. Actual construction work began on April 23, 2007, with the relocation of utility pipes, wires, and other infrastructure. This process took 14 months, nearly double the MTA's anticipated eight months.

In November 2007, Mary Peters, the United States Secretary of Transportation, announced that the Second Avenue Subway would receive $1.3 billion in federal funding for the project's first phase, to be funded over a seven-year period. However, due to cost increases for construction materials and diesel fuel affecting the prices of contracts not yet signed, the MTA announced in June 2008 that certain features of the Second Avenue Subway would be simplified to save money. One set of changes, which significantly reduces the footprint of the subway in the vicinity of 72nd Street, is the alteration of the 72nd Street Station from a three-track, two-platform design to a two-track, single island platform design, paired with a simplification of the connection to the Broadway Line spur. Supplemental environmental impact studies covering the changes for the proposed 72nd Street and 86th Street stations were completed in June 2009.

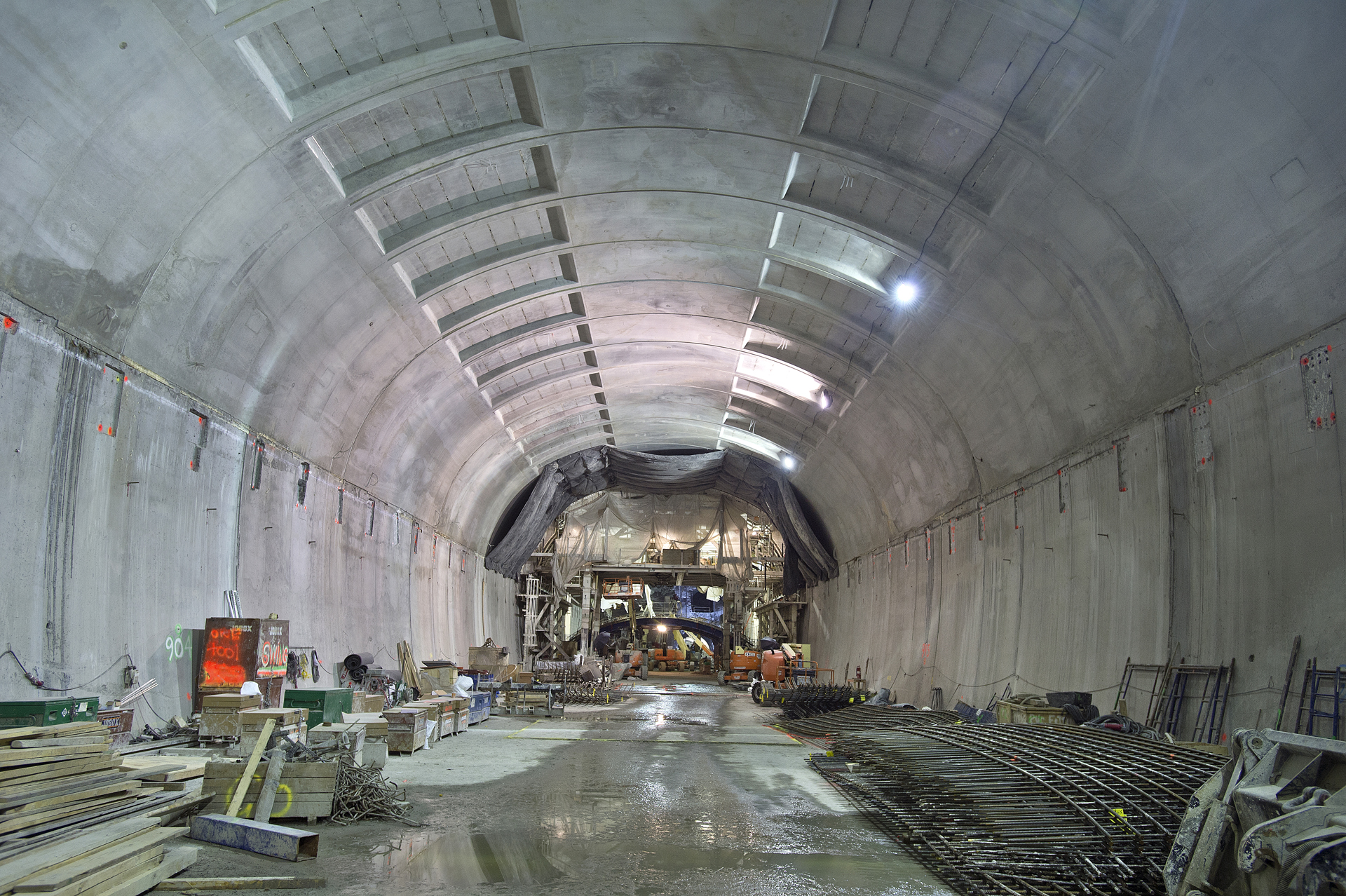
Ceiling of the 86th Street station in December 2013

On May 28, 2009, the MTA awarded a $325 million contract to E.E. Cruz and Tully Construction Co., a joint venture and limited liability company, to construct the 96th Street station box. Work on this contract began in July. In June 2009, the first of three contracts for the 86th Street station was awarded for the advance utility relocation work and construction of cut-and-cover shaft areas at 83rd and 86th Streets. Muck houses were built to store all the dirt and debris from the project.

During construction, two buildings had to be evacuated in June 2009, delaying the contractor's plan to use controlled blasting to remove bedrock in the southern section of the launch box. The tunnel boring machine was originally expected to arrive six to eight months after construction began, but the utility relocation and excavation required to create its "launch box" delayed its deployment until May 2010. On May 14, 2010, MTA's contractors completed the TBM installation and turned it on at the Second Avenue Subway launch box at 96th Street and boring southward to connecting shafts built at 86th and 72nd Streets. On October 1, 2010, MTA awarded a $431 million contract to joint venture SSK Constructors for the mining of the tunnels connecting the 72nd Street station to the existing Lexington Avenue–63rd Street station, and for the excavation and heavy civil structures of the 72nd Street station. A subsequent contract was awarded to Skanska Traylor Joint Venture for excavation of the cavern at the 86th Street station on August 4, 2011. In January 2011, MTA awarded Judlau Contracting a 40-month, $176.4 million contract to rebuild and enlarge the Lexington Avenue–63rd Street station.

=== Significant progress ===
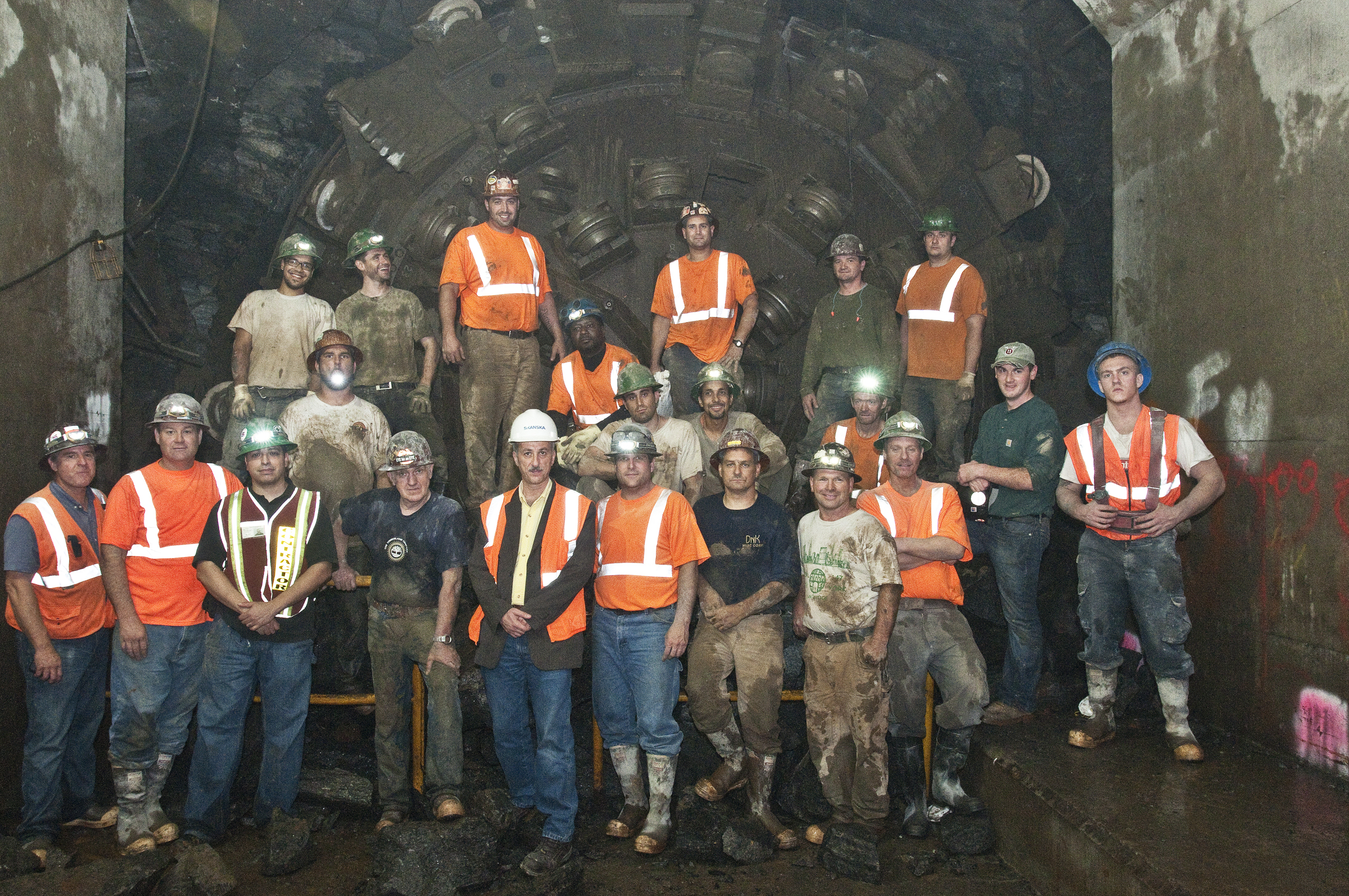
Workers celebrated after the TBM reaches the BMT 63rd Street Line.

Meanwhile, the tunnel boring machine dug at a rate of approximately 50 feet (15 m) per day. The machine finished its run at the planned endpoint under 65th Street on February 5, 2011. S3 partially disassembled the TBM and backed it out of the tunnel. It was repositioned in the east starter tunnel to begin boring again. Because the east side of Second Avenue has some soft ground not compatible with the Robbins TBM, ground-freezing was undertaken to prepare the soil for the TBM.

On March 28, 2011, S3, having completed its task of completing the 7,200-foot (2,200 m) west tunnel to 65th Street, began drilling the east tunnel, with the first 200 feet (61 m) being through soil frozen by S3 using calcium chloride solution fed through a network of pipes. The TBM drilling the east tunnel then negotiated the curve onto 63rd Street and broke through the bellmouth at the existing Lexington Avenue–63rd Street station. That bellmouth had been built in the late 1970s and early 1980s as part of the construction of the 63rd Street Line in anticipation of the construction of the Second Avenue line. The portion of the west tunnel remaining to be created was then mined using conventional drill-and-blast methods, because the curve S3 construction teams would have to negotiate was too tight for the TBM. On September 22, 2011, the TBM completed its run to the Lexington Avenue–63rd Street station's bellmouth. This major milestone was celebrated with a big ribbon-cutting to mark the TBM breaking through to the existing bellmouth. The TBM had dug a total of 7,789 feet (2,374 m) for the east tunnel.

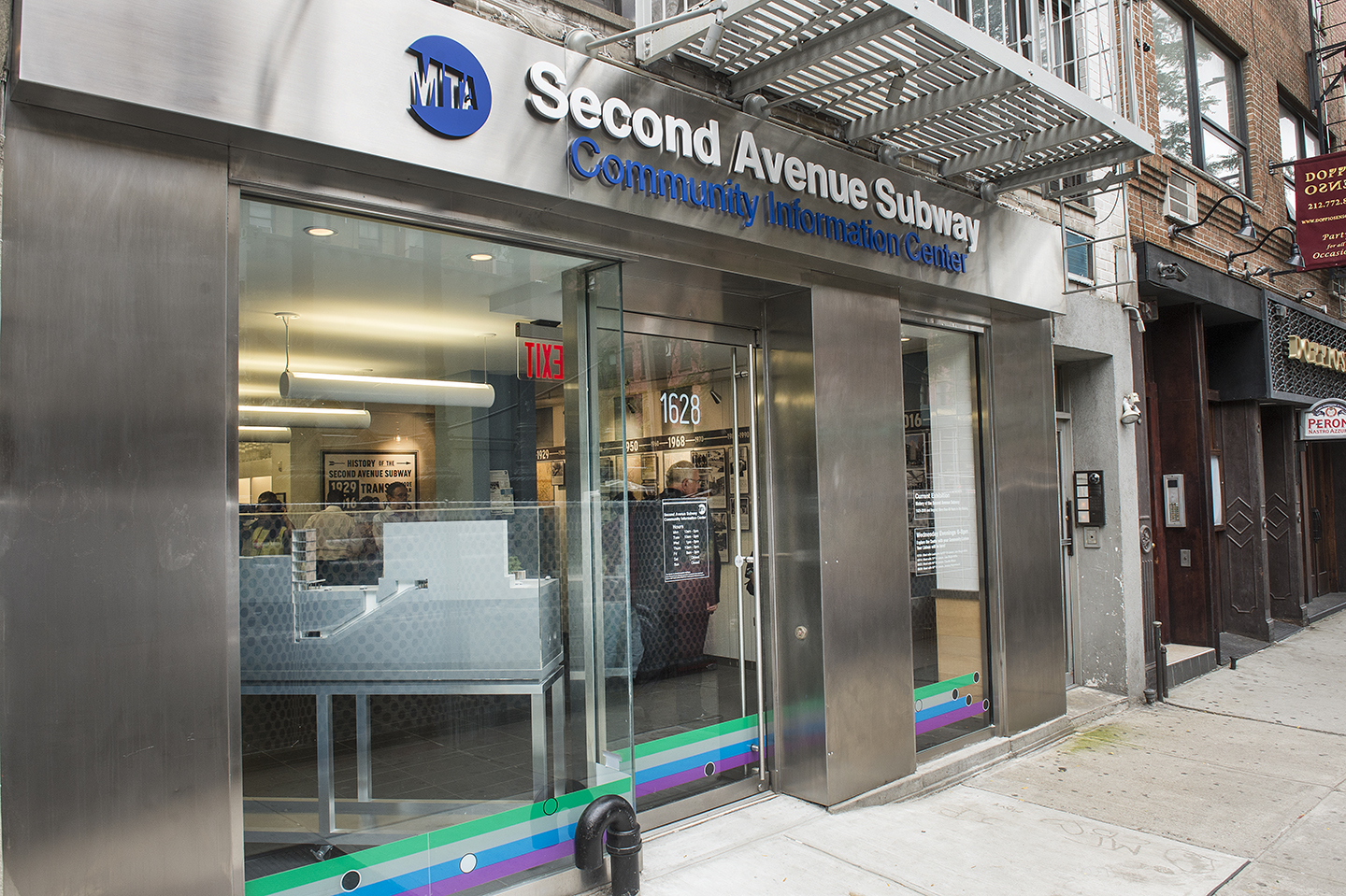
Second Avenue Subway Community Information Center

The MTA opened a Second Avenue Subway Community Information Center for Phase 1 on July 25, 2013. It was located at 1628 Second Avenue between 84th and 85th Streets, near the line's 86th Street station. In the three years that followed, the center was visited over 20,000 times.

The final contract, for architectural and mechanical and electrical work at 72nd, 86th, and 96th Street stations; rehabilitation of the Lexington Avenue–63rd Street station; and the Systems Contract (track, signals, and communications) for the entire Phase 1 area was awarded on June 1, 2013. On a July 2013 "report card" that indicated the progress of the subway by Congresswoman Carolyn Maloney, the construction progress got a "B".

Blasting for the station caverns was finished in November 2013, and the muck houses were taken down at around the same time. In the winter of 2013, many of the tracks and signal panels began to arrive at the construction site, to be installed on the line over the next few years. It was reported in November 2013 that one third of the tracks for the line had arrived, for the segments of track between 87th and 105th Streets. By August 2015, the construction project was 84.3% complete, with all ten Phase 1 construction contracts having been awarded and 5 of them having been completed.

=== Push for completion ===
On February 24, 2016, the MTA allocated $66 million to speed up the construction of the first phase so that it could open in December. However, in June of that year, it was reported that contractors for the MTA were not expending extra resources to accelerate the last portion of Phase 1 construction, threatening the line's scheduled opening. The MTA had only completed 67% of testing, and the line required hundreds of equipment tests by October 2016 in order to be deemed operational.

In a public meeting in May 2016, the MTA unveiled the first iteration of the New York City Subway map that included the Second Avenue Subway and a rerouted Q service. At the meeting, the MTA also made several suggestions for service changes, including making the N train express in Manhattan and replacing the Queens section of the Q, as well as the Manhattan local section of the N, with a reinstated W train.

On May 16, 2016, Congresswoman Maloney released another report card on the project. The overall grade improved from a "B" to an "A−", with the caveat that the December 2016 deadline be met. By July 2016, the first phase was 96.3% complete, with only systems testing, architectural finishes, streetscape restorations, and some equipment installations to be completed. However, news outlets reported that the Second Avenue Subway had a "significant risk" of a delayed opening. The test train for the subway line was not set to run until October 2016, despite the line being projected to open within two months of that date. Also, contractors had only reached 70% of the construction milestones for June 2016, and 80% of the May 2016 milestones. For instance, communications systems at the stations were not finished, despite the fact that these systems should have been wired already, and the elevator at 72nd Street had not been delivered yet. As of July 25, 2016, construction spending was only $32 million for the month, even though a monthly spending goal of $46 million was needed to complete the project on time.

The third rail was energized and test trains began operating in September 2016. Non-revenue Q trains ran through the subway in November 2016. Test trains began running through the new line on October 9, 2016 with weights to simulate rush hour loads, even though equipment installations at two stations, as well as a battery of tests, still needed to be completed in order for the line to be opened to passenger service. Shortly before the first test trains ran, the system's track geometry car determined that the twin bores of the 63rd Street Connector were too narrow for trains consisting of 75-foot (23 m) cars (i.e. trains made of R46s, R68s, or R68As) to enter the line. To accommodate trains of these longer cars, crews shaved down parts of the tunnel walls by mid-October 2016, in time for the test trains. Also in October, new subway signs and maps were erected systemwide in relation to Second Avenue Subway-related service changes. More than 1,300 signs were installed in over forty stations.

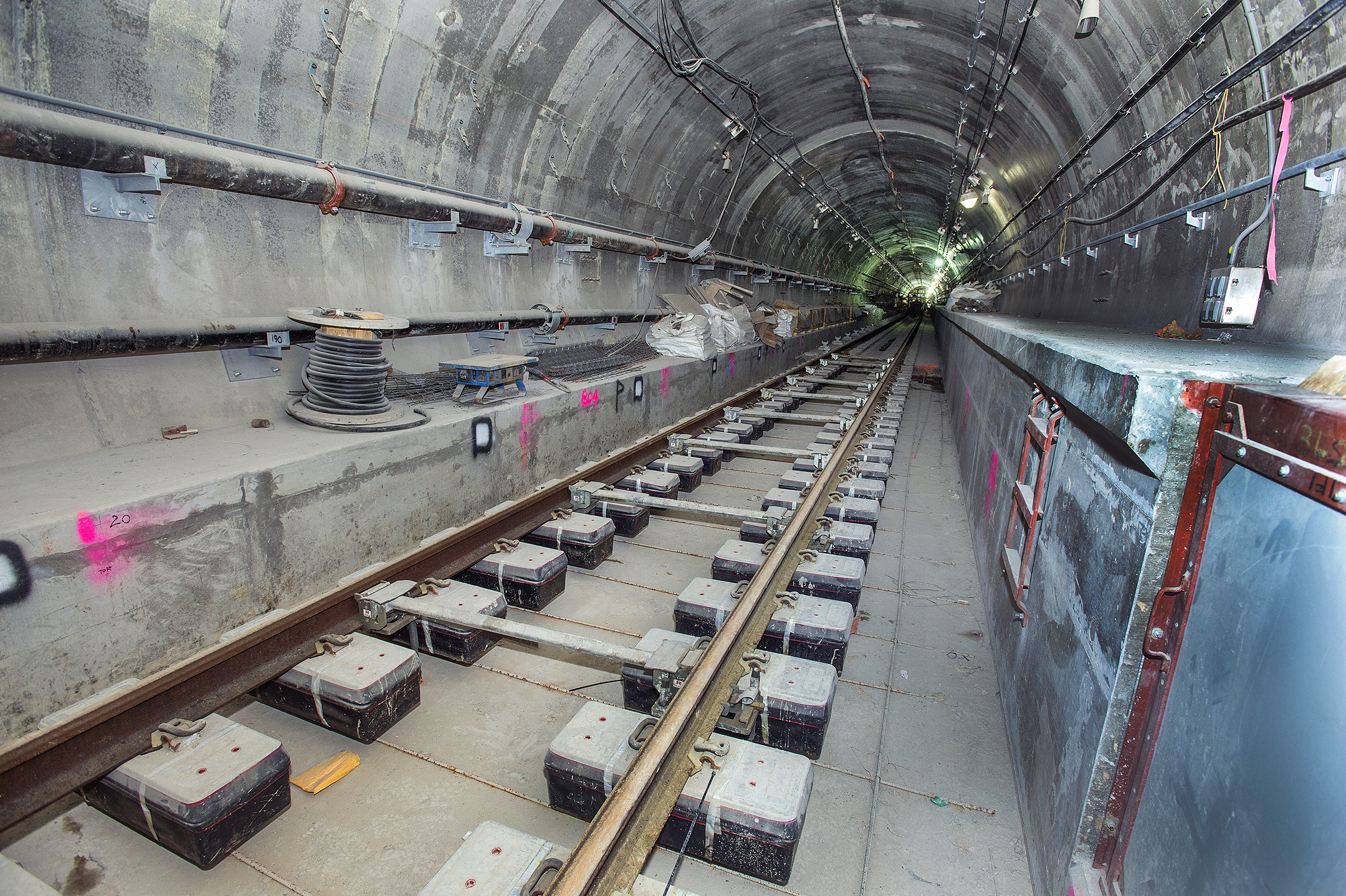
Tracks in the subway tunnel being laid in February 2015

By late October, the testing for elevators and fire alarms at 72nd Street still had not been completed, and the MTA said that there was a possibility that the subway could open with trains temporarily bypassing 72nd Street. This had been done before in September 2016, when subway trains in Chelsea temporarily bypassed several stations along 23rd Street due to bombings. There was a concern that 86th Street was also not completed, with three escalators not installed yet. The two stations were only conducting fourteen equipment tests a week, but there needed to be forty tests per week in order to ensure that the line would open on time. The tentative opening date was also clarified to "by December 31," with a possibility of a delayed opening. However, an engineer affiliated with the MTA stated that there was a possibility that the line could be delayed to 2017.

In November 2016, an independent engineer on the project raised concerns, including whether the required fire safety testing could be completed by December 15. That engineer said that "unprecedented" work was required to complete the line by the year's end. December 31 was still the planned opening date, but there have been logistical and safety concerns about the line's opening on New Year's Eve. Following this, the MTA ordered that contractors finish all remaining construction on the Second Avenues Subway before December 31. Contractors were asked to work double shifts, with all remaining fire and equipment tests to be conducted on a 24-hour-per-day, 7-day-per week schedule so that the December 31 deadline could be met. By December 5, the opening date still had not been finalized, and there still remained a chance that the line would not open until 2017.

Governor Andrew Cuomo (son of former Governor Mario Cuomo, who had allocated funding to the line) was leading the push to open the subway before year's end. On December 10, Governor Cuomo visited two under-construction Second Avenue subway stations, later stating that he was "cautiously optimistic" that the line would open before the New Year. However, as of the MTA board's monthly meeting, which occurred two days after Cuomo's visit, the subway's opening date had still not been finalized. On December 12, Cuomo visited the 96th Street station for at least his third trip in four days. At that time, officials were hoping that the final tests would be finished before December 22. The New York Times observed that Governor Cuomo's enthusiasm to open the line by December 31 stemmed from an incident that had occurred about a year and a half earlier, where officials at the MTA told him that they wanted to push the opening date back a year or two. However, several unidentified individuals have criticized Cuomo for these actions, saying that the increased involvement in the project served merely to improve his reputation. On December 14, the MTA finally announced that December 31 would be the probable opening date for the line, with all of the line's stations to open at the same time. A day later, MTA chairman Thomas Prendergast stated that the three new stations would all open at the same time, even if that meant delaying the opening of the subway.

=== Schedules for construction and opening ===
The MTA and its contractors on the project met on a regular basis with the Manhattan Community Board 8 Second Avenue Subway Task Force and Manhattan Community Board 11 to report on construction progress and to seek input from the community.

Estimated completion schedules slipped over time. When the bond issue to fund the construction was passed in 2005, the MTA said that the project would be done in 2012. This quick completion date was a part of the city's unsuccessful 2012 Summer Olympics bid; the Olympics were hosted in London instead. When construction began in 2007, the MTA stated that the new train line would open by the end of 2013. Later in 2007, the MTA gave a completion date of 2014. In its 2008 capital improvement budget proposal, the MTA pushed back completion of Phase 1 to 2015, and in 2009, the MTA pushed it back again to 2016. Some publications had predicted a December 2016 opening. Others reported that the subway would not open until 2017.

By May 2014, the agency was still targeting December 2016 as the completion date, and the project was still within its $4.45 billion budget, and still estimated to serve approximately 200,000 daily riders. By January 2015, the MTA's forecasted opening date for Phase I had been clarified even further, to around December 30–31, 2016, with Horodniceanu describing earlier estimates as lacking "the precision required." In June 2015, however, the federal government predicted that at the then-current rate of construction, the subway would not open until February 2018. After Governor Cuomo's intervention, the deadline was reset to December 31, 2016. On December 19, the start of revenue service was announced as noon on January 1, 2017. The confirmed New Year's opening date was attributed to testing being completed at a faster pace than expected. Of the New Year's Day opening date, Cuomo stated:

This January 1 deadline was a little arbitrary, because it was set back in 2009. And since 2009 a lot has happened and a lot of adjustments have been made. The first instinct is, well let’s move the deadline. And we thought it was important to keep the deadline and that we make this deadline, especially on this project that has become notorious for delay after delay.

=== Opening ===
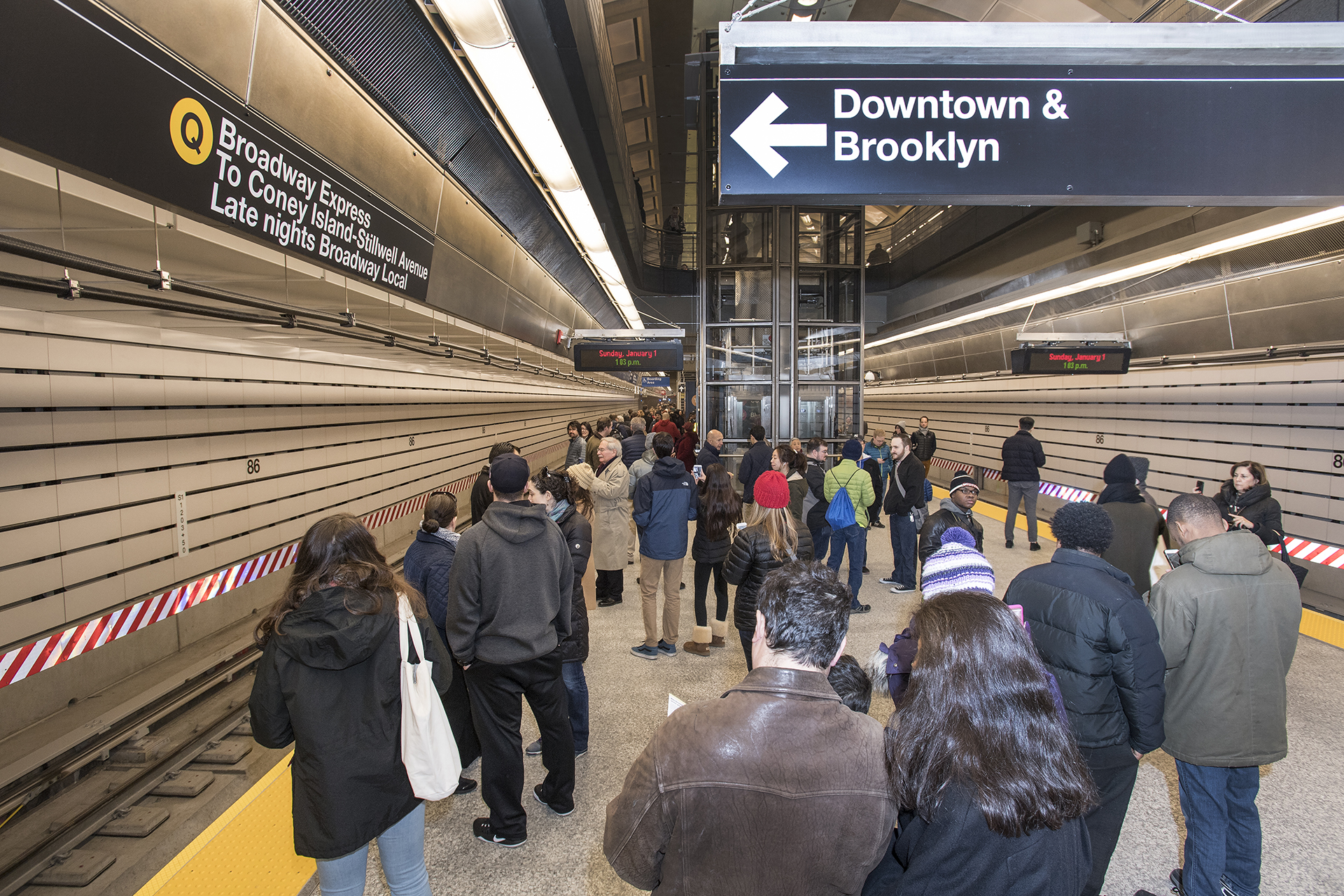
Opening day at 86th Street

On December 22 and 23, 2016, as part of an open house hosted by the MTA, the public was invited to tour the 96th Street station before it opened, to generally positive reaction. There was another open house on December 30, this time at the 86th Street station. The entrance to the Lexington Avenue–63rd Street station at Third Avenue, which was completed as part of Phase 1, was also opened on that date.

The ceremonial first train, with Governor Cuomo, Mayor Bill de Blasio and other public officials, left 72nd Street on New Year's Eve shortly after 10:30 p.m., toward 96th Street. A party was held at the 72nd Street station. The next day, on January 1, 2017, the first train left from 57th Street heading uptown. The stations on the first phase opened at 11:45 a.m, and the first trains arrived at about noon. On opening day, the stations were crowded with passengers seeking to check out the new line. About 48,200 passengers entered the new stations on that day, excluding passengers who toured the line by entering at a station in the rest of the system. The line opened to generally positive acclaim. Two trains of R160 subway cars were wrapped in Second Avenue Subway livery to celebrate the line's opening. The 96th, 86th, 72nd, and 63rd Street stations featured new artwork by artists Sarah Sze, Chuck Close, Vik Muniz, and Jean Shin, respectively.

On January 3, the first date on which the line began operating under a weekday schedule, some rush hour N trains started using the line. During the opening week of operation, trains were running every six minutes during peak hours, and there was no service between 10 p.m. and 6 a.m. Overnight service began on January 9, 2017.

=== Ridership pattern changes ===
In January 2017, compared to January 2016, ridership on the Lexington Avenue Line at the 68th Street, 77th Street, 86th Street, and 96th Street stations decreased because of the opening of Phase 1. The main decrease in ridership was at the 86th Street station, where more than 28,000 of its 120,000 daily riders switched to using the Second Avenue Subway. Overall, the Second Avenue Line's three stations and the renovated Lexington Avenue–63rd Street station saw an average weekday ridership of more than 150,000 by the end of January. The 72nd Street station was the busiest of the line's new stations, with an average daily ridership of 44,000. By April, taxi usage in the area also saw a decline of more than 20% compared to before the line's opening.

By May 15, ridership had increased to 176,000 passengers a day, reducing overall usage on the Lexington Avenue Line by 26% while representing a 42% increase from the January ridership. Because of the increasing demand, Q service was increased by one downtown trip in the morning and by one uptown trip in the evening in November 2017. In addition, one R trip started running via the line to boost service.

On July 13, 2018, the subway system's ridership totals for 2017 were released, showing that the opening of the line significantly decreased ridership at adjacent stations on the Lexington Avenue Line at 59th Street, 68th Street, 77th Street, 86th Street, 96th Street and 103rd Street. Ridership on the Lexington Avenue Line decreased by 28%, or 46,000 daily riders.

Ridership 2014–2017
Annual ridership	2014	2015	2016	2017	2014-2017 Difference	2014-2017 % Difference
Lexington Avenue/Broadway Lines stations
Lexington Avenue/59th Street	21,557,198	21,407,792	21,000,635	17,888,188	-3,669,010	-17.0%
68th Street	10,545,971	10,237,854	10,124,694	6,998,999	-3,546,972	-33.6%
77th Street	11,454,604	11,014,861	10,927,200	8,276,168	-3,178,436	-27.7%
86th Street	20,735,032	20,890,828	20,337,593	14,277,369	-6,457,663	-31.1%
96th Street	7,958,453	8,294,978	8,004,488	5,576,058	-2,382,394	-29.9%
103rd Street	5,198,601	4,031,201	4,336,922	4,402,069	-796,532	-15.3%
Total	77,449,859	75,877,514	74,731,532	57,418,852	-20,031,007	-25.9%
63rd Street/Second Avenue Lines stations
Lexington Avenue–63rd Street	4,479,963	4,718,159	5,033,950	6,389,408	1,909,445	42.6%
72nd Street				8,536,209	8,536,209	
86th Street				7,693,260	7,693,260	
96th Street				5,445,960	5,445,960	
Total	4,479,963	4,718,159	5,033,950	28,064,837	23,584,874	526.5%
Upper East Side Total	81,929,822	80,595,673	79,765,482	85,483,689	3,553,857	4.3%

=== Controversies ===
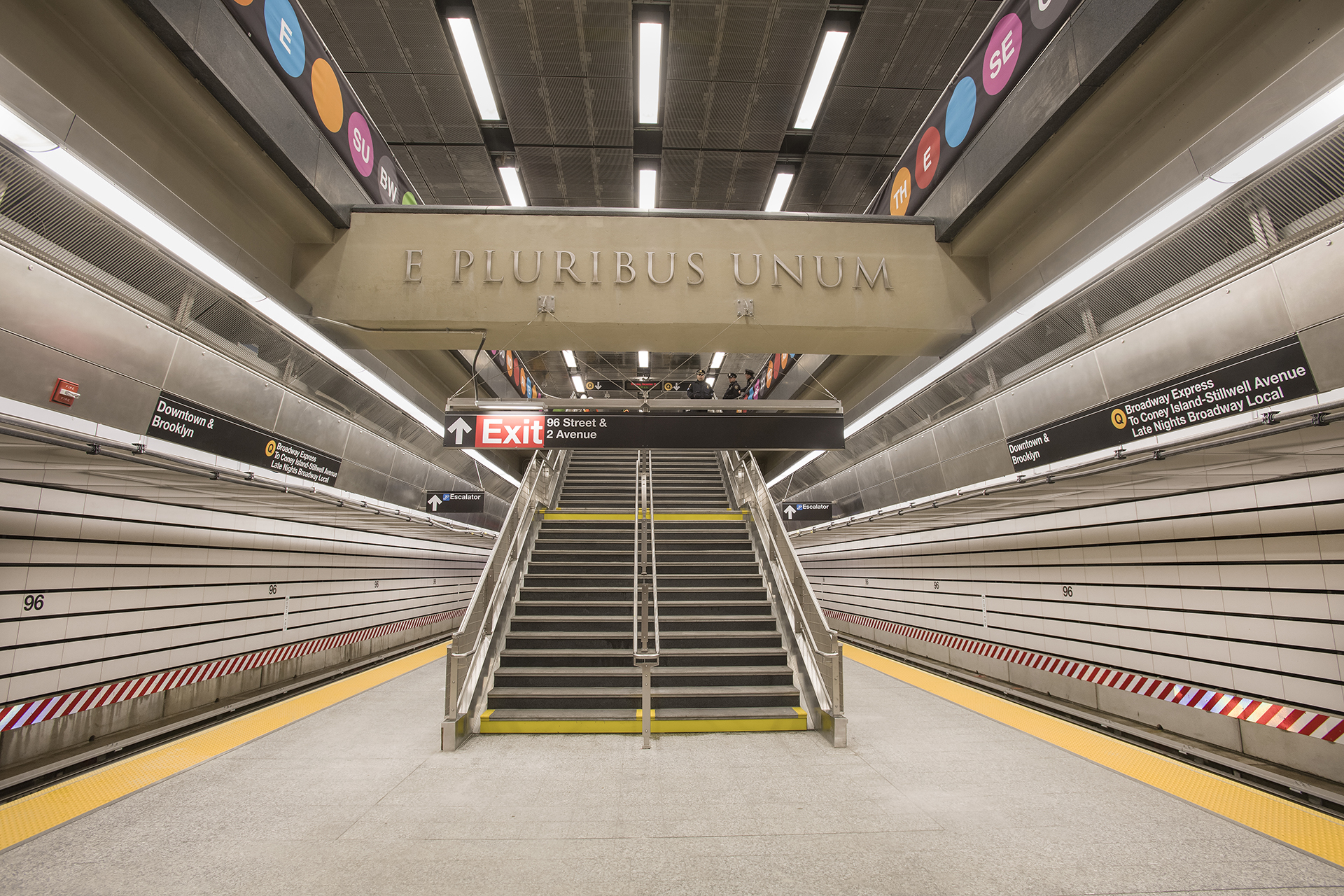
A view of the wide island platform at 96th Street

In February 2011, a lawsuit was filed by the Yorkshire Towers at 86th Street over the location of two proposed Second Avenue Subway entrances that were located right in front of the building but facing away from its semicircular driveway citing quality of life issues. However, the lawsuit was later dismissed.

In an unrelated 2012 controversy, some residents in the 72nd Street station area claimed to have come down with a "Second Avenue cough" caused by dust from construction, and local doctors saw that the air quality of the area had decreased while nasal sicknesses had increased. The MTA tried to combat this by creating new structures and using other methods to reduce dust inhalation. The MTA prepared a report that said in the 86th Street station area "all monitored concentrations were below the established benchmark levels".

The New York Daily News alleged that the subway project was very unsafe. For example, on August 8, 2012, an explosion caused rocks to fly all over an intersection. Less than two weeks later, on August 21, 2012, an uncontrolled blast for the station was done incorrectly, causing a large explosion that sent debris into the air and broke windows of buildings in the area and damaged nearby sidewalks. In another instance, contaminated rocks were carried away from a construction site on 63rd Street, and the incident went unnoticed. On March 19, 2013, in yet another allegation of wrongdoing, a construction worker got stuck in waist-deep muck at the 96th Street station site, but while he was extricated after four hours of rescue efforts, he nearly died after the incident.

In response to noise complaints caused by blasting underground, the MTA limited blasting to before 7 p.m. each day. Before the restrictions, blasting had continued to as late as 10:30 p.m. every day, shaking buildings above the corridor.

In a product-related controversy involving the Second Avenue Subway project, American Standard Testing and Consulting Laboratories (ASTCL), company president Alan Fortich, and five other executives admitted filing false documents on the subway tunnels and "thousands" of other New York City construction projects within 10 years. ASTCL had replaced Testwell Inc., another firm indicted for faking concrete tests, in 2008.

Several safety tests had been rushed in order to have the line technically open by the end of 2016. At the time of the line's opening, there were 17,260 issues along the line that needed to be fixed, and critical systems such as fire alarms still needed to be tested. By May 2017, the number of discrepancies had dropped to 7,264, but the fire alarm systems at each station were deactivated around this time, requiring fire safety chiefs to be posted at each station. As of September 2017, some of these tests had yet to be completed even though the line had been opened for eight months. The Federal Transit Administration only allowed the line to operate under a temporary safety certificate, with the permanent one expected for November of that year.

In July 2017, as temperatures in the city rose, straphangers expressed complaints about the high temperatures of stations along the line, even though they were supposed to be climate-controlled. This was since the MTA had to get permission from the City Health Department to cool the air, with a test ensuring no Legionnaires' disease in the cooling towers, a precaution arising from several deadly outbreaks in the city in previous years. The MTA had not conducted the test quickly enough, but after criticism, it received permission on July 7. Climate control was expected to be turned on by July 14.

== 2016–present: Second phase ==
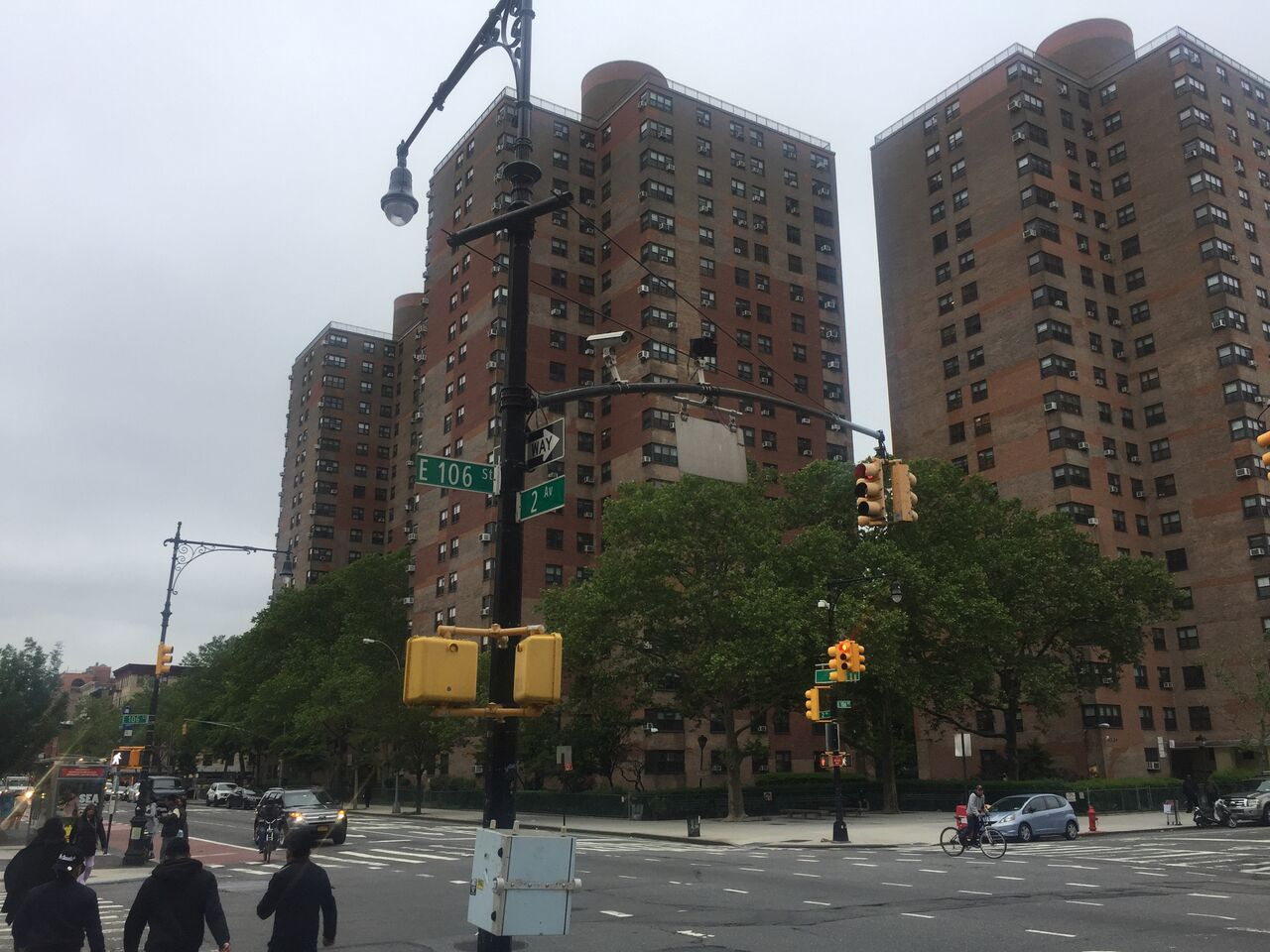
The location of the planned Phase 2 station at 106th Street and Second Avenue

The second phase, between 125th and 96th Streets, was allocated $535 million in the MTA's 2015–2019 Capital Plan for planning, design, environmental studies, and utility relocation. This phase will complete the project's East Harlem section. North of 120th Street, it will be constructed through the use of Tunnel Boring Machines (TBMs). The TBM Launch Box will be located between 121st Street and 122nd Street on Second Avenue. The TBMs will head north under Second Avenue to 121st Street before turning slightly east to curve under the Wagner Houses, before turning west on 125th Street, crossing Lexington Avenue, before ending 525 feet (160 m) west of Fifth Avenue to accommodate storage tracks. South of 120th Street, the line will utilize a tunnel section built during the 1970s, located between 110th Street and 120th Street. This section will have tracks and other essential equipment installed, like that of the rest of the line. Since it was deemed uneconomical to use TBMs, cut-and-cover will be used to connect the existing tunnel section to the bored section to the north (at 120th Street) and to the portion of the line already in operation to the south (at 105th Street).

Three new stations will be constructed at Harlem–125th Street, 116th Street, and 106th Street. Because a station at 116th Street was not part of the plan for the Second Avenue Subway when the existing tunnel section was built, part of the tunnel will have to be rebuilt to allow for a station at 116th Street. A transfer to the Lexington Avenue Line and an intermodal connection with Metro-North Railroad would be available at the Harlem–125th Street station. The original plan called for the main line to turn west onto 125th Street with tail tracks to Fifth Avenue, while tail tracks would continue north on a spur via Second Avenue to 129th Street. However, the tail tracks to 129th Street, as well as a proposed ancillary building at 127th Street and Second Avenue, were removed in a July 2018 update to the plans. Tail tracks that extend 525 feet (160 m) west of Fifth Avenue would allow for the construction of a crosstown line under the busy 125th Street corridor. The 125th Street tail tracks would be able to store four trains, and would also allow for trains to enter the Harlem–125th Street terminal at speeds that would allow for the operation of 30 trains per hour on the line. The construction of the Harlem–125th Street station and the pedestrian concourses to the Lexington Avenue Line would require temporary service outages at the 125th Street station on the Lexington Avenue Line for two years.

=== Preparations and preliminary work ===
In March 2016, the MTA began advertising Requests for Proposals (RFP) for three new contracts for the second phase, which were planned to be awarded in summer 2016. In April 2016, the MTA and the State of New York reached a deal to restore funding to Phase 2, with a total of $1.035 billion allocated. $535 million will be used to undertake preliminary construction work, such as relocating utilities, and for the design of the project, and to address environmental problems. The next $500 million would be used to prepare work for tunneling and station construction. On October 18, 2016, the de Blasio administration announced a rezoning plan for East Harlem. The plan would alter special transit zoning created in the 1970s for the Second Avenue Subway. Incentives would be offered to integrate subway infrastructure into new buildings. This is meant to improve pedestrian conditions adjacent to ventilation buildings. There would be three Special Transit Land Use (TA) districts; one for the area of the 106th Street station, one for the area of the 116th Street station, and one for the area of the Harlem–125th Street station. On November 21, 2016, the MTA requested that the Phase 2 project be entered into the Project Development phase under the Federal Transit Administration's New Starts program.

==== 2010s contracts and studies ====
By August 2017, preliminary work on the line was underway, and the engineering firm AKRF was updating the environmental impact study for Phase 2. AKRF had previously prepared the Manhattan East Side Alternatives and the original EIS for the Second Avenue Subway. The design of the project is being done by Phase 2 Partnership, a joint venture of Parsons-Brinckerhoff and STV. The EIS and design will be finished in 2018. A Second Avenue Subway Community Information Center for Phase 2, along 125th Street between Park and Madison Avenues, was planned to open in May 2017; however, the center's opening was delayed to September 18, 2017. Workers have already started testing the ground and buildings along the route looking for utilities. The MTA requested federal funds to start the relocation of utilities, the construction of the launch box for the TBMs, and for the management of the construction.

At the MTA's September 2017 board meeting, it was announced that the preliminary work was to be done by fall 2018, and a new "early work contract" was to be issued in 2019. It was also revealed that the Harlem–125th Street station would be constructed as a deeper two-track station as opposed to as a three-track station as was planned in the 2004 FEIS. The modification would reduce flexibility, but would allow the section under 125th Street to be mined, rather than being constructed as cut-and-cover, thereby reducing impacts on nearby buildings. Simulations showed that a two-track layout could support the same level of service that the three-track layout could have provided: 28 trains per hour. To make up for the loss of the track, the tail tracks west of the station would be lengthened to Lenox Avenue to allow for six trains to be stored, three per track.

In November 2017, the Regional Plan Association published its Fourth Regional Plan, which, among other things, called for the completion of the full-length Second Avenue Subway. The RPA's plan also called for two additional components to be added to Phase 2. The proposed Phase 2B would extend the Second Avenue Line under 125th Street to Broadway, while the planned phase 2C would be a spur to the 149th Street–Grand Concourse station in the Bronx, which would then connect with the IND Concourse Line. However, these plans have not been acknowledged by the MTA, nor have they been given any funding.

As of June 2018, the extended preliminary design contract would be completed in the third quarter of 2018, and the design-build contracts for tunneling and station shells would be awarded in the first quarter of 2019. An environmental impact finding was expected in fall 2018, and a Full Funding Grant Agreement with the FTA was to be completed by 2020. A supplemental environmental impact assessment for Phase 2 was published in July 2018. The FTA issued a Finding of No Significant Impact for the project on November 15, 2018. By April 2019, it was reported that the MTA was planning to acquire several dozen buildings for Phase 2, displacing over 500 workers and 100 tenants. This included hundreds of millions of dollars' worth of real estate that had been purchased by the Durst Organization and Extell Development within the past five years. The MTA also decided to build the planned 116th Street station's platform inside the existing tunnel, rather than completely rebuilding the tunnel segment, as well as reduce excavation at the Harlem–125th Street station. These two revisions were expected to save a combined $1 billion.

==== Mid-2020s contracts and groundbreaking ====
Land acquisition for Phase 2 started in April 2022. Fifteen properties would have to be seized for the extension. In April 2023, it was reported that the MTA had filed paperwork indicating plans to use eminent domain in order to acquire certain properties along the route. The MTA began soliciting bids in July 2023 for the first Phase 2 construction contract, which involved utility relocations. That October, the federal government announced a $3.4 billion grant for the construction of Phase 2. At the time, Phase 2 was set to open in early 2032. A contract for utility relocations between 105th and 110th Streets was awarded in January 2024, with work set to begin that March. The MTA also stated it would reduce the cost of Phase 2 by at least $1 billion by reducing station sizes and reusing the existing tunnels. The MTA had awarded an $182 million contract to relocate utilities. The MTA sued three landowners in August 2024, alleging that the landowners were refusing to allow the MTA to conduct pre-construction surveys for Phase 2 of the subway. That December, the agency awarded a $182 million contract for Phase 2's construction to Tectonic Engineering.

In 2025, the MTA began soliciting bids for the design and construction of Phase 2. That March, the MTA indicated hired a joint venture of AECOM and HNTB to serve as Phase 2's consultant for $186 million. The same month, the MTA increased the Design Consultant's contract, a joint venture of WSP Global and STV, to $255 million to advance the design for Contract 4 from preliminary to detailed design due to the change in delivery model from design-build to design-bid-build. In August 2025, the MTA board awarded a $1.97 billion contract to Connect Plus Partners, a joint venture between Halmar International and FCC Construction, for the construction of the 125th Street station shell, reconstruction of the existing tunnel near the 116th Street station, and new tunnels between Second Avenue–120th Street and Lenox Avenue–125th Street. The MTA filed plans to acquire more property that September, and it awarded a design contract for the tunnels north of 120th Street to COWI A/S that month.

Work on the tunnels themselves could not begin until 2027, as new tunnel boring machines had to be imported from Germany. In contrast to the Phase 1 TBMs, the new TBMs would spray the tunnels' concrete lining while digging the tunnels. The MTA anticipated that constructing the tunnels would be difficult because of the high water table; this required a cement mix to be pumped into the dirt at 120th Street before the TBMs could start drilling. In June 2026, Skanska, Traylor and Walsh received a $1.02 billion contract for the 106th Street station shell, along with connections to the existing tunnels north and south of the station. A ceremonial groundbreaking took place on June 8, 2026; at the time, the stations were planned to be completed in 2032. New York's governor Kathy Hochul had pledged to appropriate funds to study the feasibility of leaving the TBMs in place after the Phase 2 tunnels were excavated, to allow for a potential extension under 125th Street. That September, the MTA began soliciting bids for the systems contract, the last of four to be awarded for Phase 2.

=== Funding ===
The project budget originally carried $1.5 billion, which would be used to start construction of the tunnels; the MTA reduced the amount of money allocated in the budget because it could not start construction in 2019. The reduction in funding was a result of uncertain timing, not money problems; the delay had upset politicians and residents of East Harlem. In December 2016, several elected officials for the area sought $6 billion of funding for Phase 2 of the line, including $2 billion from the federal government. These officials wished to secure funding from the presidential administration of Barack Obama before Obama's term ended on January 20, 2017, saying they wanted to avoid uncertainty from the first administration of Donald Trump and start construction on Phase 2 as soon as possible. The FTA granted this request in late December 2016; the approval called for the MTA to complete an environmental reevaluation by 2018, receive funding by 2020, and open Phase 2 between 2027 and 2029. On May 24, 2017, the MTA Board approved an amendment to the 2015–2019 Capital Program, increasing funding for Phase 2 to $1.735 billion. This would allow for a near-term 30 percent match per Full Funding Grant Agreement process.

In September 2019, the MTA released a draft of their proposed $54 billion 2020-2024 capital plan. As part of the plan, the Second Avenue Subway would be completed at a cost of $6 billion. Some of the funding would come from Manhattan's new congestion charge, but a large portion would come from FTA funding. The MTA required FTA approval to enter the New Starts Program's engineering phase, but as of July 2020 had not received that approval; furthermore, the MTA's budgetary issues had forced it to suspend all capital projects "indefinitely" in June 2020. Without funding, the MTA projected that Phase 2 might have to be canceled, and construction of the tunnels would have been funded in future 5-year capital programs. With the inauguration of Joe Biden as U.S. president in 2021, the administration of Joe Biden approved $23 billion in funding for new transit projects across the United States that November, including Phase 2 of the Second Avenue Subway. Following this, Hochul pledged to start construction on Phase 2 by 2022. A $400 million grant for the Second Avenue Subway was included in the Biden administration's proposed 2022 budget.

Due to a delay in the implementation of congestion pricing in New York City, there were concerns that funding for Phase 2 would be delayed. Hochul paused the implementation of congestion pricing in June 2024, and she provided $54 million in state discretionary funds the next month, allowing utility work to resume. Although the MTA approved its 2025–2029 Capital Program in September 2024, it was still unclear whether Phase 2 would be fully funded without congestion revenue. The MTA voted in November 2024 to implement the congestion pricing program, which went into effect in January 2025, allowing bids to proceed. The second Trump administration proposed allocating a combined $1 billion for the project and the Gateway Program in June 2025. That October, at the start of the 2025 United States federal government shutdown, Office of Management and Budget director Russell Vought withheld a combined $18 billion for the two projects, citing reports of diversity, equity, and inclusion practices that he described as "unconstitutional"; Politico cited the move as retaliation for the government shutdown. That December, the U.S. government stated that the funding for the Second Avenue Subway and Gateway Project could be unfrozen if DEI practices were discontinued on these projects. Although the MTA had addressed the federal government concerns by late January 2026, the funding had still not been unfrozen by then. The agency sued the Trump administration that March, seeking to unfreeze the federal funds; Trump, who was personally unaware of the lawsuit, said he supported the project. That month, the MTA advanced a $1 billion construction contract for the project.

=== Timeline ===
The project management consultant's contract is for 91 months (7.5 years), which may put the completion of Phase 2 in 2032. The following table shows the updated contract packaging strategy for Second Avenue Subway Phase 2.

Contracts	Description	Delivery Model	Contractor	Award Date
1	Utility relocation and building remediation / protection along Second Avenue in Manhattan	Design-Bid-Build	C.A.C. Industries	January 2024
2	Rehabilitation of certain existing tunnels, the construction of two bored running tunnels and associated cross passages, and for the construction of the structural shells for the 116th Street and 125th Street Stations	Design-Build	Connect Plus Partners (joint venture between Halmar International and FCC Construction)	August 2025
3	Tunnel and structural shell of the 106th Street Station	Design-Build	SAS2-C3 (joint venture between Skanska, Walsh Construction Company II, and Traylor Bros.)	March 2026
4	Systems contract that provides for the construction of station entrances and ancillary buildings, fit out of the new stations and tunnels with architectural finishes and mechanical, electrical, plumbing, vertical circulation elements, and installation of track, traction power, communication, and signal and train control systems	Design-Bid-Build	TBD	TBD

== Other phases ==
=== Phases 3 and 4 ===
Phase 3, which has no funding commitments, will extend the line southward along Second Avenue from 63rd Street to Houston Street. Upon its completion, a new service will operate running between Harlem–125th Street and Houston Street. In 2017, phases 2 and 3 were estimated to cost a combined $14.2 billion. In 2023, the MTA indicated in its 20-year needs assessment that the construction of Phase 3 was not a priority, as the agency wished to extend Phase 2 westward instead.

Phase 4, which also has no funding commitments, will provide an extension from Houston Street to a permanent terminus, with storage tracks, at Hanover Square. These storage tracks, initially recommended in the SDEIS, would allow for the storage of four trains, and they would run south of Hanover Square from Coenties Slip to a traffic island located near Peter Minuit Plaza at a depth of 110 feet (34 m). The Hanover Square terminal is only planned to be able to turn back 26 trains per hour instead of 30 as less capacity will be needed on the line south of 63rd Street. The Hanover Square station would be deep enough to allow for the potential extension of Second Avenue Subway service to Brooklyn through a new tunnel under the East River.

=== Phase 2 extension under 125th Street ===
In October 2023, the MTA published a comparative evaluation of potential expansion and improvement projects to the region's transit system as part of its 2025–2044 Twenty-Year Needs Assessment. One project evaluated was the extension of the line westward under 125th Street. If built, the extension would be estimated to cost $7.5 billion. On January 9, 2024, Governor Kathy Hochul announced her support for this project in her 2024 State of the State Address. The book for the address stated that a study would be completed in six months to evaluate the feasibility of the project and the potential to have the tunnel boring machines that will construct a portion of Phase 2 continue west on 125th Street for this extension. In January 2026, Hochul announced that she would request funding to extend the Second Avenue Subway along 125th Street. Hochul's proposal called for the line to be extended beyond Lexington Avenue, with connections to existing stations at Lenox Avenue, St. Nicholas Avenue, and Broadway. The MTA began an environmental review process for the 125th Street extension that October.
