= Phil Reed =

American politician

Member of the New York City Council from the 8th district
- In office January 1, 1998 – December 31, 2005
- Preceded by: Adam Clayton Powell IV
- Succeeded by: Melissa Mark-Viverito

Personal details
- Born: February 21, 1949 New York City, US
- Died: November 6, 2008 (aged 59) New York City, US
- Education: Ohio Wesleyan University
- Profession: Salesperson; Non-profit organizer

Phil Reed (February 21, 1949 – November 6, 2008) was a New York City Council Member from 1998 to 2005, when term limits forced him out of office. He represented the 8th district, encompassing Manhattan neighborhoods of East Harlem and Manhattan Valley, and a portion of the South Bronx, as well as Randall's Island, Wards Island and Central Park. He was the first openly gay African-American New York City Council Member. From 2002 to 2005 he was the chair of the Council's Committee on Consumer Affairs.

Reed was born in New York on February 21, 1949. He dropped out of Ohio Wesleyan University and received conscientious objector status during the Vietnam War. Prior to joining the Council, Reed worked for ten years as a sales representative for Otis Elevator Company in San Francisco. After returning to New York City, he was the project director at the East New York HIV/AIDS Project, and as the Director of Public Affairs for the Hetrick-Martin Institute. In 1981, he first developed symptoms that were ultimately diagnosed as HIV. From mid-1995 to early 1997, he underwent 18 months of chemotherapy for multiple myeloma, a virulent form of bone marrow cancer. In 2003, Reed completed Harvard University's John F. Kennedy School of Government program for Senior Executives in State and Local Government as a David Bohnett LGBTQ Victory Institute] Leadership Fellow.

Reed had earlier run and lost bids for the New York State Senate and the City Council. In 1997, Adam Clayton Powell IV ran for Manhattan Borough President, and Reed won a five-way race in the Democratic Party primary to fill Powell's vacant seat. He won the 1997 general election with 75% of the vote, outpacing four challengers led by Republican George L. Espada who had 18% of the vote.

While in office, Reed gained attention for his work to prevent childhood asthma, a serious problem in his district. He also concentrated on measures to increase affordable housing and refurbish neighborhood parks. Reed vigorously opposed Mayor Rudy Giuliani's plan to relocate the Museum of the City of New York from its location in East Harlem to the Tweed Courthouse in downtown Manhattan. Mayor Michael Bloomberg ultimately scrapped this plan, moving the New York City Department of Education to the Tweed Courthouse instead.

Reed lived on the Upper West Side and died at age 59 on November 6, 2008, of complications of pneumonia that resulted from leukemia.

== See also ==
- LGBT culture in New York City
- List of LGBT people from New York City
- NYC Pride March

Political offices
Preceded by Adam Clayton Powell IV	New York City Council, 8th district 1998–2005	Succeeded by Melissa Viverito
