= New York City's 8th City Council district =

- Boundaries following the 2020 census
- Country: United States

Government
  - Councilmember: Elsie Encarnacion (D—East Harlem)

Population (2010)
  - Total: 162,606

Demographics
  - Hispanic: 50%
  - Black: 22%
  - White: 20%
  - Asian: 6%
  - Other: 2%

Registration
  - Democratic: 76.8%
  - Republican: 4.3%
  - No party preference: 16.1%
- Registered voters (2021) 117,149

New York City's 8th City Council district is one of 51 districts in the New York City Council. It has been represented by Democrat Elsie Encarnacion since 2026, succeeding term-limited fellow Democrat Diana Ayala. Among the seat's former occupants includes former Council Speaker Melissa Mark-Viverito.

== Geography ==
District 8 covers several majority-Hispanic neighborhoods in northern Manhattan and the South Bronx, including Mott Haven, Port Morris, most of East Harlem, and parts of Highbridge, Concourse, and Longwood. Randalls and Wards Islands are also a part of the district.

The district overlaps with Manhattan Community Board 11 and Bronx Community Boards 1, 2, and 4, and with New York's 12th, 13th, and 15th congressional districts. It also overlaps with the 29th, 30th, and 32nd districts of the New York State Senate, and with the 68th, 77th, 84th, and 85th districts of the New York State Assembly.

The district is one of three in the City Council to span two different boroughs, the others being the 34th district in Brooklyn and Queens and the 50th district in Brooklyn and Staten Island. Although the 8th district's population is split evenly across Manhattan and the Bronx, its five most recent councilmembers have all hailed from Manhattan.

== Recent election results ==
=== 2025 ===
2025 New York City Council election, District 8 Democratic primary
Party	Candidate	Maximum round	Maximum votes	Share in maximum round	Maximum votes First round votes Transfer votes
Democratic	Elsie Encarnacion	7	6,689	58.6%	
Democratic	Wilfredo Lopez	7	4,718	41.4%	
Democratic	Clarisa Ayaleto	6	3,101	24.1%	
Democratic	Raymond Santana	5	2,514	18.2%	
Democratic	Rosa Diaz	4	1,821	12.6%	
Democratic	Federico Colon	3	1,376	9.1%	
Democratic	Nicholas Reyes	2	1,097	7.1%	
Write-in		1	86	0.6%	

2025 New York City Council election, District 8 general election
Party	Candidate	Votes	%
Democratic	Elsie Encarnacion	20,972	
Working Families	Elsie Encarnacion	3,681	
Total	Elsie Encarnacion	24,653	84.7
Republican	Tyreek Goodman	3,025	
Conservative	Tyreek Goodman	461	
Total	Tyreek Goodman	3,486	12.0
Unity	Federico Colon	909	3.1
Write-in		69	0.2
Total votes		29,117	100.0
Democratic hold			

=== 2023 (redistricting) ===
Due to redistricting and the 2020 changes to the New York City Charter, councilmembers elected during the 2021 and 2023 City Council elections will serve two-year terms, with full four-year terms resuming after the 2025 New York City Council elections.

2023 New York City Council election, District 8
Party	Candidate	Votes	%
Democratic	Diana Ayala (incumbent)	5,571	87.3
Republican	Exodus Gary	741	11.6
Write-in		68	1.1
Total votes		6,380	100.0
Democratic hold			

=== 2021 ===
In 2019, voters in New York City approved Ballot Question 1, which implemented ranked-choice voting in all local elections. Under the new system, voters have the option to rank up to five candidates for every local office. Voters whose first-choice candidates fare poorly will have their votes redistributed to other candidates in their ranking until one candidate surpasses the 50 percent threshold. If one candidate surpasses 50 percent in first-choice votes, then ranked-choice tabulations will not occur.

An interactive map of District 8

2021 New York City Council election, District 8
Primary election
Party	Candidate	Votes	%
Democratic	Diana Ayala (incumbent)	6,621	56.5
Democratic	Tamika Mapp	3,391	28.9
Democratic	Antoinette Glover	1,077	9.2
Democratic	Manuel Onativia	512	4.4
Write-in		121	1.0
Total votes		11,722	100
General election
Democratic	Diana Ayala (incumbent)	12,007	98.8
Write-in		142	1.2
Total votes		12,149	100
Democratic hold			

=== 2017 ===
2017 New York City Council election, District 8
Primary election
Party	Candidate	Votes	%
Democratic	Diana Ayala	4,012	43.5
Democratic	Robert Rodriguez	3,895	42.2
Democratic	Tamika Mapp	902	9.8
Democratic	Israel Martinez	393	4.3
Write-in		21	0.2
Total votes		9,223	100
General election
Democratic	Diana Ayala	13,541	
Working Families	Diana Ayala	800	
Total	Diana Ayala	14,341	90.9
Republican	Daby Carreras	738	
Reform	Daby Carreras	61	
Stop De Blasio	Daby Carreras	31	
No Rezoning 4 Ever	Daby Carreras	16	
Total	Daby Carreras	846	5.4
Conservative	Linda Ortiz	531	3.4
Write-in		59	0.3
Total votes		15,777	100
Democratic hold			

=== 2013 ===
2013 New York City Council election, District 8
Primary election
Party	Candidate	Votes	%
Democratic	Melissa Mark-Viverito (incumbent)	3,768	35.7
Democratic	Ralina Cardona	1,899	18.0
Democratic	Edward Santos	1,710	16.2
Democratic	Tamika Humphreys	1,215	11.5
Democratic	Gwen Goodwin	986	9.3
Democratic	Sean Gardner	986	9.3
Write-in		3	0.0
Total votes		10,567	100
General election
Democratic	Melissa Mark-Viverito	13,854	
Working Families	Melissa Mark-Viverito	442	
Total	Melissa Mark-Viverito (incumbent)	14,296	93.8
Republican	Ralina Cardona	793	5.2
Libertarian	Christopher Giattino	131	0.9
Write-in		24	0.1
Total votes		15,244	100
Democratic hold			
