= Melissa Mark-Viverito =

American politician (born 1969)

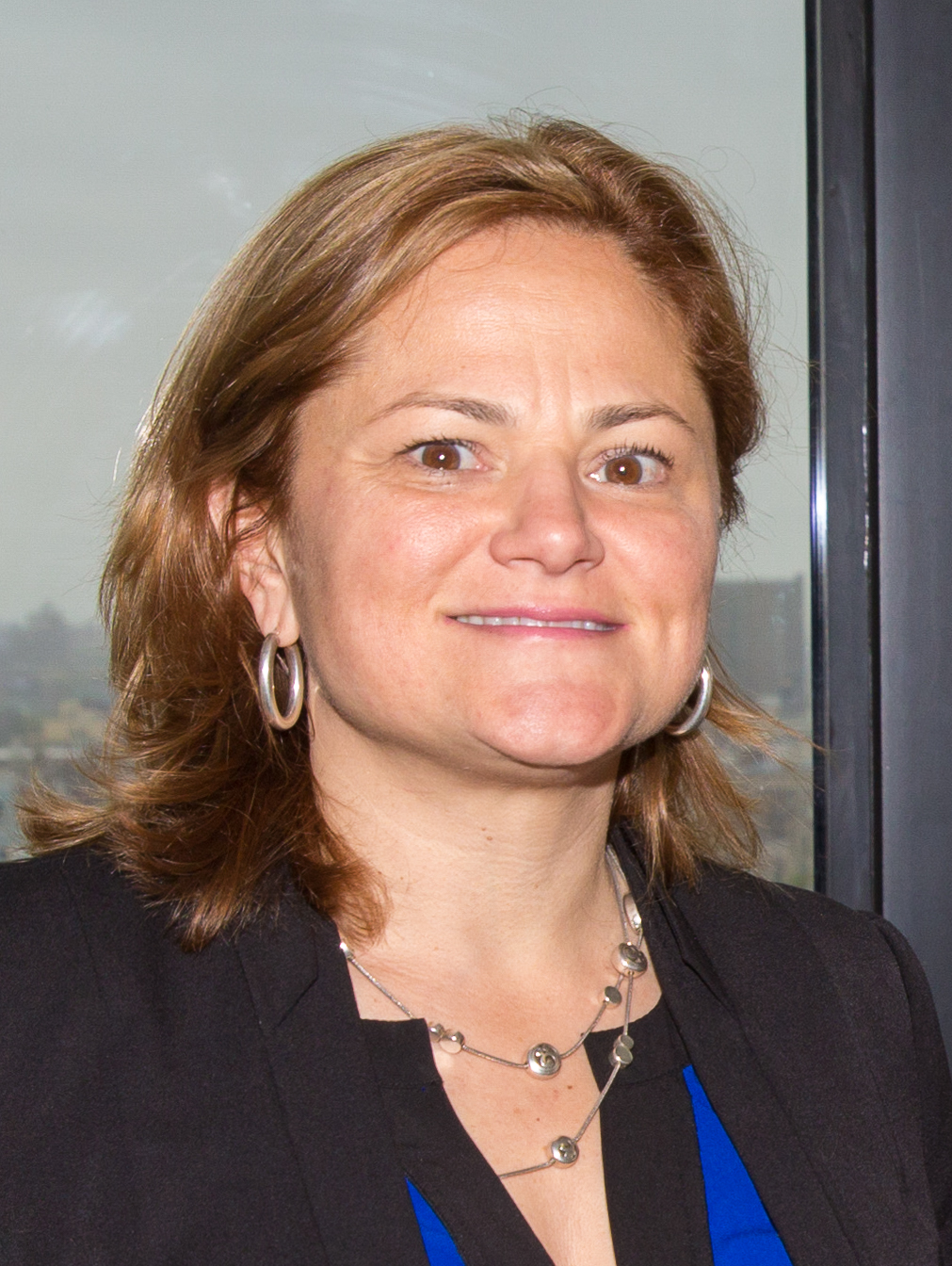

Speaker of the New York City Council
- In office January 8, 2014 – December 31, 2017
- Preceded by: Christine Quinn
- Succeeded by: Corey Johnson

Member of the New York City Council from the 8th district
- In office January 1, 2006 – December 31, 2017
- Preceded by: Phil Reed
- Succeeded by: Diana Ayala

Personal details
- Born: April 1, 1969 (age 57) Bayamón, Puerto Rico
- Party: Democratic
- Education: Columbia University (BA); Baruch College (MPA)

Melissa Mark-Viverito (born April 1, 1969) is an American Democratic politician and former speaker of the New York City Council from 2014 to 2017, as well as councilmember for the 8th district from 2006 to 2017, representing Concourse, Concourse Village, East Harlem, Highbridge, Longwood, Mott Haven, Port Morris, and Randall's Island.

Described by The New York Times as "fiercely liberal", she was elected Speaker on January 8, 2014, succeeding Christine Quinn.

== Early life and education ==
Mark-Viverito was born in Bayamón, Puerto Rico, to Anthony Mark, a physician and founder of San Pablo Hospital, and Elizabeth Viverito. She grew up in Bayamón, where her mother still resides.

At the age of eighteen, she moved to New York to attend Columbia University, from which she graduated in 1991 with a bachelor of arts degree. She received her Master of Public Administration from Baruch College in 1995.

== Career ==
Mark-Viverito served as a member of Manhattan Community Board 11, coordinator of the movement Todo Nueva York con Vieques, president of Mujeres del Barrio, and strategic organizer for Local 1199 of the Service Employees International Union (SEIU), an influential health care workers union.

=== New York City Council ===
After running unsuccessfully against Phil Reed for City Council in District 8 in 2003, Mark-Viverito was elected to the position when Reed reached his term limit in 2005. During her first four years in office, Mark-Viverito sponsored and passed several pieces of legislation regarding tenant harassment, building safety, greening buildings, and park conservancies. In January 2009, she criticized the voting record of newly appointed New York Senator Kirsten Gillibrand on immigration.

During Mark-Viverito's second term in the Council, she served as chair of the Parks and Recreation Committee and as founding co-chair of the Progressive Caucus.

In November 2013, she won re-election to her third term in the Council, and her close ally Bill de Blasio was elected mayor. Soon the New York Daily News cited Mark-Viverito as "the front-runner" for "New York City's second-most powerful political post — Speaker of the City Council." A grassroots effort to boost her Speaker candidacy included social media, fliers, phone banking, and volunteer recruitment.

Mark-Viverito was elected City Council Speaker on January 8, 2014, at age 44. She was the first Speaker to be born outside of the continental United States. She was the second woman elected Speaker. She was the first member of the Council's Black, Latino and Asian Caucus to hold this position. Her first "State of the City" speech emphasized reform of the criminal justice system.

In January 2016, Mark-Viverito introduced a collection of eight bills known as the "Criminal Justice Reform Act" to reduce the penalty for acts such as violating park rules, littering and public urination from misdemeanors to the civil process. In addition, the Criminal Justice Reform Act also suspended enforcement for "excessive noise," which resulted in a sudden spike in noise complaints around the five boroughs, according to data compiled by 311, New York City's complaint submission platform. Mark-Viverito sponsored the bills so that young people in communities of color could "fulfill their potential" by incentivizing officers to give verbal warnings and fines but not remove the option of making arrests.

In 2016, Mark-Viverito was alleged to have pressured the New York City Housing Authority to fire a black manager of a NYCHA housing project and replace her with a "Spanish manager". As of 2018, the lawsuit is still pending and the City of New York's motion to dismiss the lawsuit was denied.

In 2017, Mark-Viverito declined to boycott the Puerto Rican Day Parade, after organizers decided to honor Oscar López Rivera, a prominently incarcerated member of Fuerzas Armadas de Liberación Nacional Puertorriqueña (FALN).

=== 2019 NYC Public Advocate Special Election ===
In 2018, Mark-Viverito announced her intention to run for the open seat of New York City Public Advocate, but lost to Jumaane Williams.

=== New York's 15th Congressional District ===
In August 2019, Mark-Viverito announced her candidacy to replace José E. Serrano as representative of New York's 15th Congressional District, but lost in the primary to Ritchie Torres, receiving 4.3% of the vote with a rank of 6th place.

== Personal life ==
Mark-Viverito campaigned in solidarity with the Occupy Wall Street movement and identified herself as part of the "99%" of income earners despite having a net worth in the millions. She and her family inherited an estimated $6.7 million from her father, a doctor. Prior to her inheritance, she applied for a taxpayer-subsidized loan in 1998 when her property at the time was worth $310,000. As of 2014, the multi-story condominium property was worth around $1,300,000. Mark-Viverito rents out her properties, but did not report her rental income. Her spokesman claimed it to be an honest oversight on her part.

In August 2014, Mark-Viverito publicly disclosed that she was infected with the most common STD, the human papillomavirus. She said she was an "extremely private person" but that she what announcing it because she wanted to destigmatize and raise awareness about the disease.

In 2016, in response to the Donald Trump's Access Hollywood tape recording, Mark-Viverito public revealed that she had been a victim of childhood sexual abuse, drawing the support of many, including other elected officials.

== Election history ==
New York City Council: District 8
Election	Candidate	Party	Votes	Pct	Candidate	Party	Votes	Pct	Candidate	Party	Votes	Pct	Candidate	Party	Votes	Pct
2005 Primary	Melissa Mark-Viverito	Dem	3,626	25.40%	Felipe Luciano	Dem	3,610	25.30%	Joyce Johnson	Dem	2,744	19.23%	Others (3)	Dem	4,255	30.06%
2005 General	Melissa Mark-Viverito	Dem	16,743	99.98%												
2009 Primary	Melissa Mark-Viverito	Dem	4,993	46.73%	Robert J. Rodriguez	Dem	2,827	26.46%	Gwen Goodwin	Dem	1,255	11.75%	Others (2)	Dem	1,554	15.17%
2009 General	Melissa Mark-Viverito	Dem	17,091	99.99%												
2013 Primary	Melissa Mark-Viverito	Dem	3,768	35.67%	Ralina Cardona	Dem	1,899	17.98%	Edward N. Santos	Dem	1,710	16.70%	Others (3)	Dem	3,186	30.80%
2013 General	Melissa Mark-Viverito	Dem	14,296	93.78%	Ralina Cardona	Rep	793	5.20%	Christopher Giattino	Dem	131	.86%				

== See also ==
- Puerto Ricans in New York City
- Puerto Ricans in the United States

Political offices
Preceded by Philip Reed	Member of the New York City Council from 8th district 2006–2017	Succeeded by Diana Ayala
Preceded by Christine Quinn	Speaker of the New York City Council; 2014–2017	Succeeded by Corey Johnson
