= Diana Ayala =

American politician

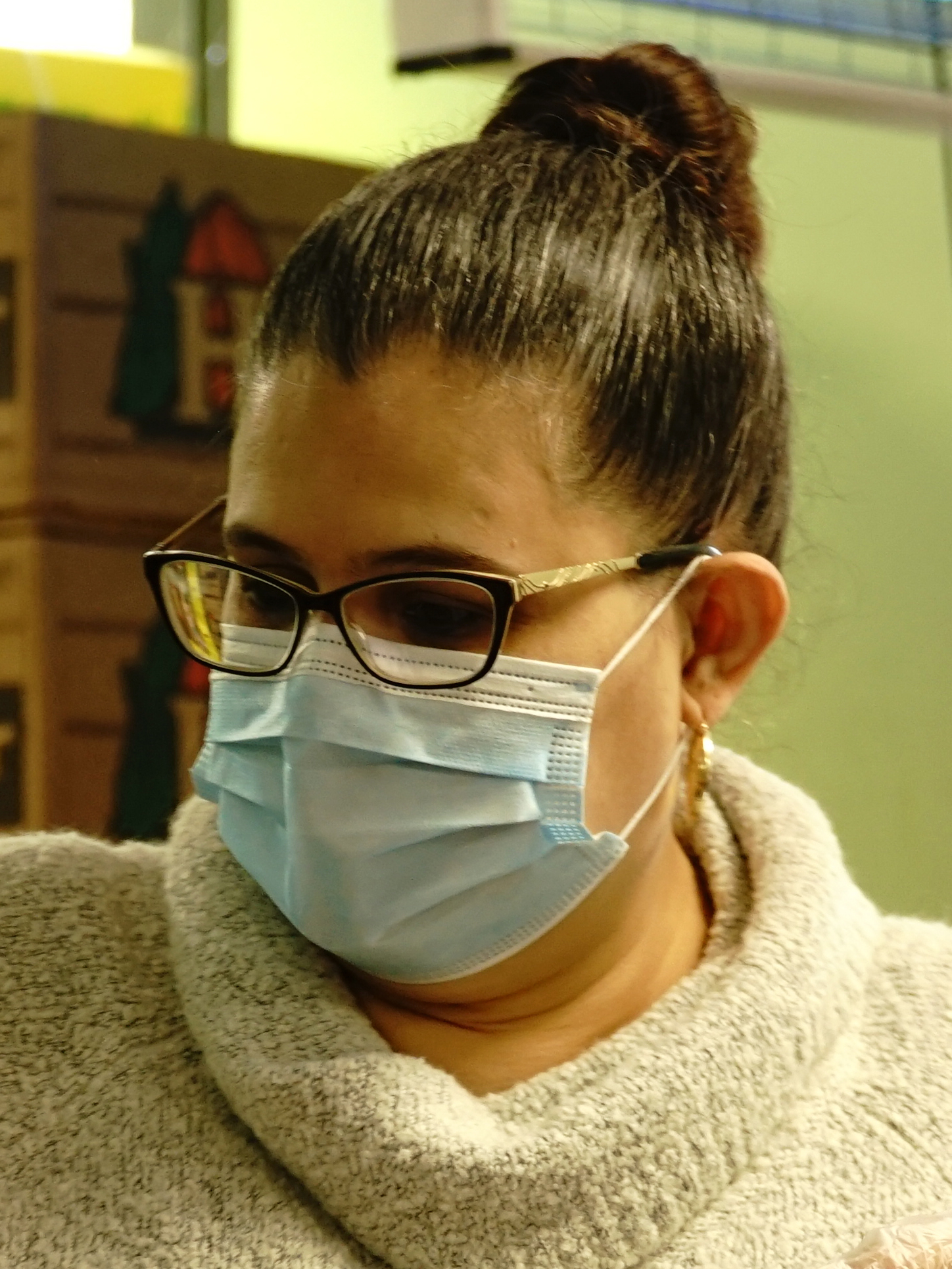

Deputy Speaker of the New York City Council
- In office January 5, 2022 – December 31, 2025
- Preceded by: Position reestablished
- Succeeded by: Nantasha Williams

Member of the New York City Council from the 8th district
- In office January 1, 2018 – December 31, 2025
- Preceded by: Melissa Mark-Viverito
- Succeeded by: Elsie Encarnacion

Personal details
- Born: September 24, 1973 (age 53) Río Piedras, Puerto Rico
- Party: Democratic
- Education: Bronx Community College (AS); Lehman College (BS)
- Website: Official website

Diana Ayala (born September 24, 1973) is an American politician, who served as a member and the deputy speaker of the New York City Council until 2025. Ayala represented the 8th district, succeeding former Council Speaker Melissa Mark-Viverito in 2017. The district includes Concourse, East Harlem, Highbridge, Longwood, Mott Haven, Port Morris, and Randall's Island. She is a member of the Democratic Party.

== Early life and education ==
Born in Rio Piedras, Puerto Rico, she and her family moved to New York City when she was a child. They lived in public housing at the Lillian Wald Houses in Alphabet City, Manhattan after living in shelters. She received an associate degree in Human Services from Bronx Community College, and a bachelor's degree in Sociology from Lehman College in 2000.

== Career ==
Ayala worked as a Senior Center Director in East Harlem for seven years. She then served as Constituent Services Director and Deputy Chief of Staff for her predecessor, Melissa Mark-Viverito.

=== New York City Council ===
Ayala ran against three other candidates in the Democratic primary for the open 8th city council district. Ayala had the support of Melissa Mark-Viverito, the term-limited incumbent and Speaker. Ayala's main primary opponent was Robert J. Rodriguez, an assemblyman. Ayala won the primary narrowly with 43.5% of the vote (4,012 votes) to Rodriguez's 42.23% (3,895 votes). In the general election, Ayala won 91.07% of the vote (13,617 votes), while her Republican opponent, Daby Benjaminé Carreras, won 5.26% (787 votes) and her Conservative opponent, Linda Ortiz, won 3.30% of the vote (494 votes).

Ayala criticized fellow New York City Councilwoman Inna Vernikov for not apologizing for bringing a gun to a Pro-Palestine rally at Brooklyn College a few days after the October 7, 2023 attacks against Israeli citizens by members of Hamas in Israel. Vernikov was arrested, but no charges were filed because the gun was missing a part that made it unfunctional. Ayala motioned to end the investigation from proceeding for another year in the Rules Committee chaired by Sandra Ung.

=== New York State Assembly ===
In February 2026, Ayala announced that she was challenging Assemblyman Eddie Gibbs and ran to replace him in the New York State Assembly.

Ayala won the June 2026 Democratic primary with 51.9% of the vote (5,759 votes) to Gibbs' 31.1% (3,453 votes). She was uncontested in the November General Election 2026.

Election history
Location	Year	Election	Results	
NYC Council District 8	2017	Democratic Primary	√ Diana Ayala 43.50% Robert J. Rodriguez 42.23% Tamika Mapp 9.78% Israel Martinez 4.26%	
NYC Council District 8	2017	General	√ Diana Ayala (D) 90.90% Daby Carreras (R) 5.36% Linda Ortiz (Conservative) 3.37%	
NYC Council District 8	2021		Democratic Primary	√ Diana Ayala 51.90% Tamika Mapp 28.9% Antoinette Glover 9.2% Manuel Onativia 4.4%
NYC Council District 8	2021	General	√ Diana Ayala (D) 98.7%	
NYC Council District 8	2023	General	√ Diana Ayala (D) 87.4% Exodus Gary (R) 11.6%	
NY State Assembly	2026		Democratic Primary	√ Diana Ayala 51.90% Eddie Gibbs 31.1% Tamika Mapp 11.5% William Smith 564

== Personal life ==
Ayala and her long-time partner live in East Harlem. She has four children and three grandchildren.

Political offices
Position reestablished	Deputy Speaker of the New York City Council; 2022–2025	Succeeded by Nantasha Williams
