= Chico (artist) =

American graffiti artist

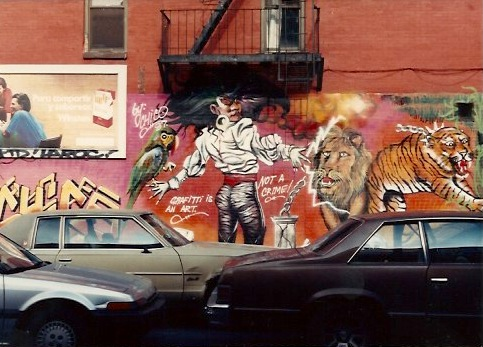
- An early example of Chico's work. "Graffiti is an art, not a crime" (1987), Alphabet City, New York, January 1988
- Born: Antonio Garcia
- Website: chicoartnyc.com

Antonio 'Chico' Garcia is a graffiti artist based on the Lower East Side of Manhattan in New York City. He is well known in the neighborhood of Alphabet City, where he grew up, and has been featured in several periodicals. He contributed artwork to Ray's Candy Store. Some of his art is independent, while other art is commissioned. His work includes paintings, three-dimensional art of various kinds, as well as collaborative canvases with photographer Jonathan White.
