= Manhattan Community Board 11 =

Manhattan Community District 11
- Community District
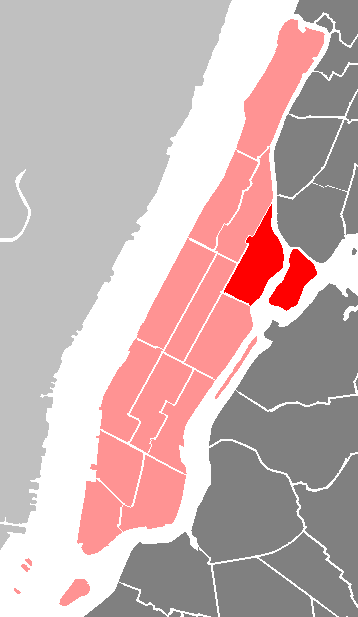
- Country: United States
- State: New York
- City: New York City
- Borough: Manhattan
- Neighborhoods: list: East Harlem; Randalls and Wards Islands

Government
  - Chairperson: Adem Brija
  - District Manager: Angel D. Mescain

Area
  - Land: 2.4 sq mi (6.2 km^{2})

Population (2010)
  - Total: 120,511
  - Density: 50,000/sq mi (19,000/km^{2})

Ethnicity
  - Hispanic and Latino Americans: 45.6%
  - African-American: 30.9%
  - White: 13.7%
  - Asian: 7.7%
  - Others: 2.1%
- Time zone: UTC−5 (Eastern)
  - Summer (DST): UTC−4 (EDT)
- ZIP codes: 10029, 10035, and 10037
- Area code: 212, 646, and 332, and 917
- Police Precincts: 23rd (website); 25th (website)
- Website: www.cb11m.org

The Manhattan Community Board 11 is a New York City community board encompassing the Manhattan neighborhoods of East Harlem and Randalls Island. It is delimited by the East River on the east, 96th Street on the south, Fifth Avenue and Mount Morris Park on the west, as well as by the Harlem River on the north. It also includes Ward Island Park and Randall Island Park.

Its current Chair is Adem Brija and its District Manager is Angel Mescain.

== Demographics ==
As of 2000, the Community Board has a population of 117,743 up from 110,509 in 1990 and 114,569 in 1980. Of them (as of 2000), 8,565 (7.3%) are White non Hispanic, 42,062 (35.7%) are African-American 3,185 (2.7%) Asian or Pacific Islander, 240 (0.2%) American Indian or Native Alaskan, 384 (0.3%) of some other race, 1,964 (1.7%) of two or more race, 61,343 (52.1%) of Hispanic origins. 44.8% of the population benefit from public assistance as of 2009, up from 36.7% in 2000.

The land area is 1,520.2 acres, or 2.4 square miles (6.2 km^{2}).
