= Reputational damage =

Type of financial loss

Reputational damage is the loss to financial capital, social capital and/or market share resulting from damage to an organization's reputation. This is often measured in lost revenue, increased operating, capital or regulatory costs, or destruction of shareholder value. Ethics violations, safety issues, security issues, a lack of sustainability, poor quality, and lack of or unethical innovation can all cause reputational damage if they become known.

Reputational damage can result from an adverse or potentially criminal event, regardless of whether the company is directly responsible for said event (as was the case of the Chicago Tylenol murders in 1982). Extreme cases may lead to large financial losses or bankruptcy, as per the case of Arthur Andersen.

Reputation is recorded as an intangible asset in a company's financial records. Hence, damage to a firm's reputation has financial repercussions. Minor issues can be amplified by external social processes which lead to even more severe impacts on a firm's position.

== Examples of reputational damage ==
=== Boeing ===
A Boeing 737 MAX jet crashed in 2018 in Indonesia killing 189 people then in 2019 another jet crashed killing 157 people. Boeing initially blamed lack of training and pilot error. Later it was discovered the aircraft had a secret pitch adjustment system called MCAS that would override pilot input. This was never disclosed to the operators or pilots. It was discovered that Boeing had offshored the software development to low pay overseas Indian software programmers with no experience in flight critical code. Boeing, grilled in congress for safety lapses, eventually fired the CEO for putting "profits ahead of safety". The planes were grounded for over a year while defects were corrected and airworthiness could be re-certified. He was replaced by then Boeing chairman Dave Calhoun. In 2024, a door plug fell off a MAX 737 airplane operated by Alaska Airlines. United Airlines - one of the major customers of Boeing stated they no longer have confidence in Boeing to meet its contractual obligations. Southwest Airlines stated they were turning to Airbus - a Boeing competitor - for new airplanes. The persistent and ongoing quality lapses have tarnished Boeing's reputation.

"The 737 MAX crisis severely damaged Boeing's reputation and eroded trust among key stakeholders, including airlines, passengers, regulators, and the general public. The accidents and subsequent revelations about the aircraft's design and certification processes raised questions about Boeing's commitment to safety and transparency."

=== BP ===
After the Deepwater Horizon disaster in April 2010, the offshore rig, which BP had leased, exploded and sank in the Gulf of Mexico. Eleven workers died, and the accident caused the largest marine oil spill in United States history. In 2013, BP Exploration and Production pleaded guilty to 14 criminal counts, including 11 counts of felony manslaughter and one count of felony obstruction of Congress, and was sentenced to pay US$4 billion in criminal fines and penalties.

A 2022 peer-reviewed study using YouGov BrandIndex data and a synthetic-control comparison estimated that BP's reputation declined by approximately 50% relative to the control after the disaster. Although almost half of the loss was recovered over the next 18 months, BP remained below the counterfactual comparison through December 2017. The researchers found no statistically significant decline in its stock-market returns over the medium term (one to two years) or long term (two to seven years).

=== Oxfam GB ===
Following February 2018 reports about sexual misconduct by Oxfam GB staff involved in humanitarian work after the 2010 Haiti earthquake, and the charity's handling of the matter, Oxfam GB lost 7,000 regular donors. In a Guardian/ICM poll of more than 2,000 people, 35% of respondents said the disclosures made them less likely to donate to humanitarian charities; Oxfam's chief executive acknowledged that the controversy had damaged the wider aid community. Oxfam also agreed to suspend bidding for new UK government funding until the required standards were met.

In 2019, the Charity Commission's statutory inquiry found that Oxfam GB had repeatedly fallen below safeguarding standards, tolerated poor behavior, and had not reported the Haiti events as fully or frankly as it should have. It concluded that the incidents and the way Oxfam handled them had "undoubtedly damaged" its reputation and public confidence, and found that disclosure had at times been influenced by a desire to protect donor relationships. The regulator issued an official warning and directed the trustees to submit an action plan.

=== Qantas ===
In September 2023, The New York Times reported that scandals and service failures had alienated Australians from Qantas, long associated with safety and comfort. Chief executive Alan Joyce brought forward his retirement; chairman Richard Goyder announced his departure the next month as the board acknowledged "significant reputation and customer service issues".

In August 2024, a Qantas-commissioned governance review found that a top-down culture limited challenges to senior management and contributed to reputational harm. The board reduced Joyce's remuneration by A$9.26 million. In October, the Federal Court of Australia ordered A$100 million in penalties after Qantas admitted misleading consumers by selling tickets on flights it had decided to cancel and failing to notify ticketholders promptly. Qantas also undertook to pay about A$20 million to affected customers.

A January 2025 ABC News report said disputes over refunds, flight credits and tickets for cancelled flights had taken Qantas from Roy Morgan's most trusted travel-and-tourism brand to second on its distrust ranking. For the 12 months to June 2026, Roy Morgan ranked Qantas tenth among Australia's most distrusted brands, an improvement of three places.

=== Toyota ===
Toyota recalled 8 million vehicles worldwide and froze the sales of eight models in the U.S. in January 2010 amongst pressure from the public, industry regulators and the media. By company estimates, Toyota lost approximately US$2 billion due to the recalls and subsequent lost sales. Additionally, Toyota was fined US$16 million for failing to report the issues promptly and endangering lives.

More tangible financial harm became evident in 2014, when Toyota and the U.S. Justice Department agreed on a settlement of US$1.2 billion and a public admission of guilt from Toyota for neglecting the defects. The reputational aftermath of these events was measured by Rasmussen, who found that despite 59% of Americans finding Toyota at least somewhat "favorable", there was a significant portion (29%) who found Toyota "very unfavorable".

=== Wells Fargo ===
Wells Fargo was exposed for opening millions of unauthorized bank accounts in 2016. This was done by the firm's retail bankers, who were encouraged or coerced by some supervisors.

The CEO (John Stumpf) and other executives were dismissed. Regulators subjected the bank to fines and penalties, and customers reduced, suspended, or discontinued activities with the bank. The company suffered from heavy reputational damage and financial losses.

Reputational risk was further worsened in 2019 when new legislation was introduced by the House of Representatives. The new legislation uncovered Wells Fargo's practice of offshoring thousands of American jobs and forcing soon to be unemployed workers to train their foreign replacements.

Wells Fargo reputation was further damaged when an Indian Wells Fargo executive was caught urinating on a fellow passenger on an international flight, and again when an employee died at her desk and no one noticed for over 4 days until a foul smell caused employees to complain.

== Reputational risk management ==
Proposed frameworks to manage reputational risk include:

- Systematically tracking evolving stakeholder expectations.
- Identifying stakeholder risk factors as part of a general risk management process.
- Transforming risk management processes to become more proactive rather than reflexive.
- Regularly auditing the catalysts of corporate reputations using the most recent reputation monitoring technologies and services.

== See also ==
- Audit
- Continuous auditing
- COSO framework, Risk management
- Quality audit
