= Timothy J. Sloan =

American banker

- Born: 1959 or 1960 (age 65–66)
- Education: University of Michigan
- Occupation: Banker
- Title: Former CEO and president, Wells Fargo
- Term: October 2016-March 2019
- Predecessor: John Stumpf
- Successor: C. Allen Parker (interim CEO)
- Spouse: Married
- Children: 3

Timothy J. Sloan (born 1959/60) is an American banker. He was the chief executive officer (CEO) of Wells Fargo from October 2016 until he resigned in March 2019, after significant pressure related to an ongoing controversy related to an account fraud scandal. He had previously been chief operating officer (COO) and chief financial officer (CFO).

== Education ==
Sloan earned a BA in economics and history and an MBA in finance and accounting, both from the University of Michigan–Ann Arbor.

== Career ==
Sloan worked as a bank teller at Standard Federal Savings and Loan Association in Ann Arbor, during the summer holidays while a student. In 1984, he joined Continental Illinois National Bank and Trust. In 1987, he joined Wells Fargo, rising to COO and president in November 2015.

== Consumer Financial Scandals ==
On March 28, 2019, Sloan quit Wells Fargo effective June 30, 2019 after struggling for two and a half years to contain scandals that led to public criticism by US bank regulators and calls in Congress for his departure.

== Personal life ==
Sloan is married, with three adult children, and lives in San Marino, a suburb of Los Angeles.
