= Allspring Global Investments =

Global investment management firm

Allspring Global Investments, LLC
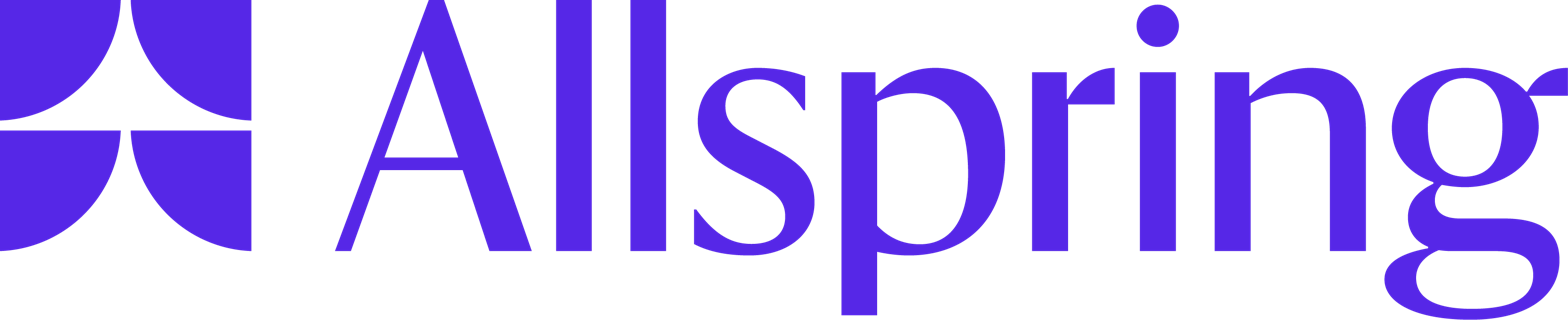
- Formerly: Wells Fargo Asset Management
- Company type: Private
- Industry: Investment management
- Founded: 1995; 31 years ago
- Headquarters: Charlotte, North Carolina, U.S.
- Key people: Kate Burke (CEO)
- AUM: US$571 billion (June 2024)
- Owners: GTCR; Reverence Capital Partners; Wells Fargo
- Number of employees: 10,15 (2024)
- Website: www.allspringglobal.com

Allspring Global Investments (Allspring) is a global asset management firm headquartered in Charlotte, North Carolina. It was previously the asset management unit of Wells Fargo until November 2021 when it commenced operations as an independent firm.

== History ==
Allspring Global Investments was originally the asset management unit of Wells Fargo known as Wells Fargo Asset Management (WFAM) that was established in 1995.

In October 2020, Wells Fargo was exploring the sale of WFAM as part of its efforts to focus more on core competencies and improve its financial performance after the Wells Fargo cross-selling scandal. At the time, WFAM had $607 billion in assets under management as of September 30, 2020, and produced an annual revenue of $1 billion. The businesses under WFAM such as Analytic Investors, Galliard Capital Management, and Golden Capital Management were included as part of the sale.

On February 23, 2021, Wells Fargo announced that it agreed to sell WFAM to private equity firms GTCR and Reverence Capital Partners for $2.1 billion. Wells Fargo would keep a 9.9% stake in the unit and would continue as a client and distribution partner. Over 20% of the unit would be owned by employees. Nico Marais, the CEO of WFAM would continue his role leading the unit and Joseph Sullivan, the former CEO of Legg Mason would join as executive chairman. It was believed that WFAM would be able to operate and grow more effectively on its own rather than as part of a bank that is more regulated.

On November 1, 2021, the transaction was completed. WFAM officially rebranded as Allspring Global Investments and commenced operations as independent firm. Marais retired from his post as CEO and was succeeded by Sullivan, who was in turn succeeded by Kate Burke as CEO in July 2025.

In October 2022, Allspring moved its headquarters from San Francisco to Charlotte. According to its own statement, Charlotte was selected for its business friendly environment and was also considered an important financial centre on the east coast.
