= Carrie Tolstedt =

Banking executive

- Born: Kimball, Nebraska, U.S.
- Education: University of Nebraska–Lincoln
- Occupation: Banking executive

Carrie L. Tolstedt is an ousted American banking executive and former head of the community banking division at Wells Fargo, from which she retired in 2016 before the company's account fraud scandal came to light. In 2017, Wells Fargo retroactively fired Tolstedt for cause. In 2023, she would plead guilty to obstructing a bank examination.

== Early life ==
Tolstedt grew up in Kimball, Nebraska, where she says she first became interested in banking from following her father, a baker, to the local bank after work. She graduated from the University of Nebraska–Lincoln.

== Career ==
Toldstedt worked at Wells Fargo for 27 years. She was formerly on Fortune's Most Powerful Women list, and in 2015, she was ranked #27 on this list and as the most powerful female banker in the United States. Under Tolstedt's supervision, her unit's employees opened over 2 million mostly unauthorized accounts for their customers. Her retirement was initially announced in July 2016 and scheduled for the end of the year, but she later chose to retire in September instead, after the account scandal became known to the public.

In April 2017, Wells Fargo's board of directors released a report on the account fraud scandal accusing Tolstedt of downplaying problems at Wells Fargo's banks. The same report recommended that the bank take back $47.3 million in stock options Tolstedt had received, in addition to $19 million they had already taken back from her. The report mentioned Tolstedt's name 142 times, whereas former Wells Fargo CEO John Stumpf was named only 81 times. Additionally, the report primarily blamed Tolstedt for the company's misconduct in the scandal, while Stumpf was mainly blamed for not firing Tolstedt sooner. The report stated that Stumpf was hesitant to criticize Tolstedt, and that he once called her "the best banker in America". Tolstedt's law firm, Williams & Connolly, responded to the report by saying that they "strongly disagree" with its findings.

In response to the report, Wells Fargo retroactively fired Tolstedt for cause and revoked $47.3 million that they had previously paid her. This brought the total amount of money she had given up to $67 million, or about 54% of her $125 million pay package she initially received when she retired.

As of early January, 2020, multiple former Wells Fargo executives are facing possible criminal charges and could be indicted in early 2020.

On January 23, 2020, OCC regulators announced an additional $25-million fine against Tolstedt for her role during the fraud, an amount they state could rise higher. While others involved in the scandal had given up clearing their charges, Tolstedt continued to fight against her own.

On November 11, 2020 the SEC charged her with civil charges that she mislead investors about key performance metrics relating to the commercial bank unit she was responsible for at the bank.

On March 15, 2023, Tolstedt pled guilty to obstructing a bank examination, and faces up to 16 months in prison. Tolstedt was ultimately sentenced to three years of probation and six months of home confinement. Tolstedt must also serve 120 hours of community service.
