= Charles Scharf =

American banker (born 1965)

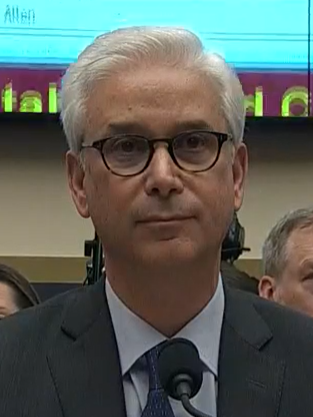
- Scharf in 2020
- Born: April 24, 1965 (age 61); New York City, U.S.
- Education: Johns Hopkins University (BA); New York University (MBA)
- Occupation: Business executive
- Title: CEO of Wells Fargo
- Predecessor: C. Allen Parker

Charles W. Scharf (born April 24, 1965) is an American business executive who is the chairman and CEO of Wells Fargo. He has been CEO of Wells Fargo since October 2019, and its chairman since October 2025.

He was previously CEO of Bank of New York Mellon (BNY), and, prior to that, CEO of Visa Inc.

== Early life and education ==
Scharf was born in 1965 in New York City, and grew up in the New York suburb of Westfield, New Jersey. His father was a stockbroker, and as a teenager Charles worked in back-office jobs at Manhattan brokerage firms.

Scharf received a BA in social and behavioral sciences from Johns Hopkins University in 1987.

He earned an Executive MBA from New York University Stern School of Business in 1991.

== Career ==
In 1987, a family connection assisted Scharf with an introduction to Jamie Dimon, who hired him for a back-office job at Commercial Credit, a growing consumer finance company where Dimon was CFO and Sandy Weill was CEO. After six months, Scharf was made Dimon's assistant. Scharf's career proceeded at Dimon's and Weill's subsequent acquisitions, mergers, and organizarions, including Primerica, Smith Barney, Salomon Brothers, and Travelers, and eventually Citigroup, Bank One, and JPMorgan Chase.

From 1995 to 1999, Scharf was the CFO of Salomon Brothers and its successor company Salomon Smith Barney.

From 1999 to 2000, he was the CFO of the global corporate and investment bank division at Citigroup, Inc.

He was CFO of Bank One from 2000 to 2002, and chief executive of Bank One's retail division from 2002 to 2004. After Bank One merged with JPMorgan Chase & Co. in 2004, he was chief executive of JPMorgan Chase's retail financial services business from 2004 to 2011. Scharf orchestrated the bank's acquisition and integration of the bankrupt and heavily indebted Washington Mutual in 2008; the deal gave JPMorgan Chase a coast-to-coast retail presence for the first time. He was a managing director of One Equity Partners, JPMorgan's private-equity investment division, from 2011 to November 2012.

Scharf took over as Visa Inc.'s CEO in November 2012, succeeding Joseph Saunders. He was also appointed as a board member after increasing the size of the board from 10 to 11 members. Scharf received a total compensation of $24.20 million, including base salary, stock grants and incentives in 2013. Under Scharf's tenure, Visa placed at number 238 on the Fortune 500, with $11.7 billion in revenue.

On October 17, 2016, Scharf advised Visa's board of directors that he could no longer spend enough time in San Francisco "to do the job effectively". and that he would step down on December 1 of that year.

Scharf was CEO of Bank of New York Mellon (BNY) from July 2017 to September 2019, and the chairman of its board from January 2018 to September 2019.

Scharf became president and CEO of Wells Fargo on October 21, 2019. The Washington Post said his "broad experience makes Scharf a safe political choice, who is already well known by both regulators and lawmakers." He leads the bank from his New York office, and travels frequently to other Wells Fargo hubs.

In November 2019, Scharf appointed BNY Mellon vice chairman and former U.S. Secretary of Commerce and White House Chief of Staff Bill Daley to be head of public affairs for Wells Fargo. By September 2020, Scharf had committed to major cost cuts, and had appointed additional new executives including a new chief financial officer, chief operating officer, leader of the credit cards division, and chief compliance officer; many of the new appointees had worked with him at JPMorgan Chase.

In 2023, Scharf's total compensation from Wells Fargo was $26 million. It rose to $31.2 million in 2024, a 7.6 percent increase from the year before.

In June 2025, the Federal Reserve lifted the punitive asset cap that had been imposed on Wells Fargo in February 2018. The asset-cap lift was largely credited by analysts to Scharf's clean-up and turnaround efforts as CEO. Reuters noted that this clean-up included installing new leadership, cutting more than 55,000 jobs, exiting unprofitable businesses, reworking the bank's risk management and controls, and reworking the company's performance-review process.

In October 2025, Scharf was appointed chairman of Wells Fargo's board of directors.

== Additional posts ==
In February 2014, President Barack Obama announced his intent to nominate individuals to key administration posts, including Scharf, who was appointed as a member of the President’s Advisory Council on Financial Capability for Young Americans.

Scharf is on the board of directors of Microsoft.

He is a member of The Business Council, and vice chair of the Bank Policy Institute.

He is an emeritus trustee of Johns Hopkins University.

== Personal life ==
Scharf and his wife Amy have two daughters. They live in New York.

== Comments about diversity ==
Reuters reported that during a covid-lockdown Zoom meeting in the summer of 2020, Scharf drew both criticism and praise for comments about black people in the workforce when he said that Wells Fargo faced issues reaching diversity goals because there was not enough qualified minority talent to draw from. On June 18, 2020, he had sent out a company-wide memo saying: “While it might sound like an excuse, the unfortunate reality is that there is a very limited pool of black talent to recruit from.” His Zoom-meeting comment reportedly angered some unidentified black employees of the company. The Reuters report also stated "Not all attendees recalled being offended. 'The meeting was incredibly constructive... I walked away being incredibly surprised at how genuine and sincere he is,' said Alex David, president of the Black/African American Connection Team Member Network." Ken Bacon, a black former mortgage industry executive, was quoted as being "shocked and puzzled" by Scharf's comments.

The Reuters report noted that within his first year as CEO Scharf had already added two black executives to Wells Fargo's operating committee and had pledged to double the number of black leaders at the bank over five years.
