= John Stumpf =

American businessman (born 1953)

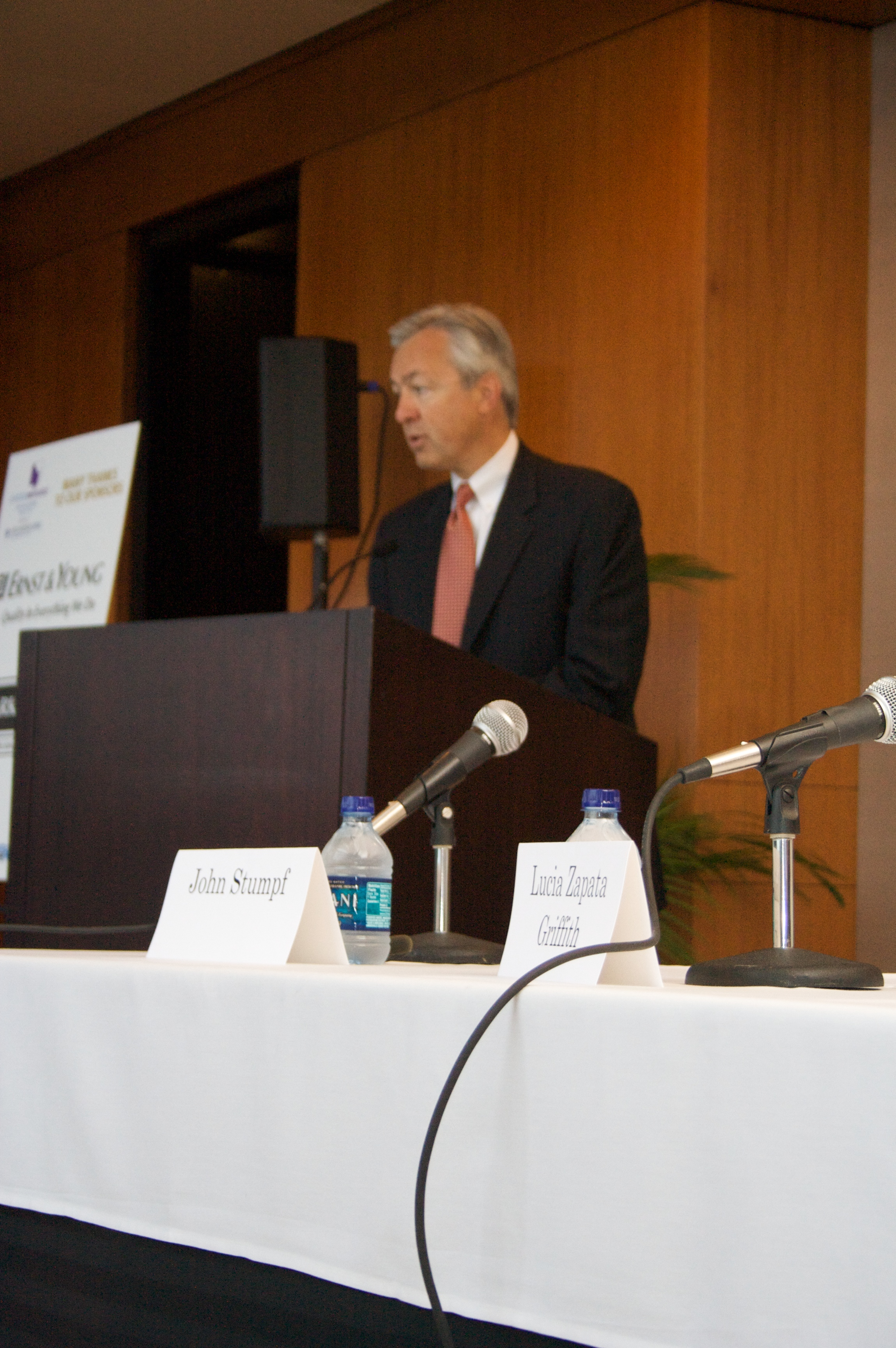
- Stumpf in 2009
- Born: September 15, 1953 (age 73); Pierz, Minnesota, U.S.
- Education: St. Cloud State University (BS); University of Minnesota (MBA)
- Known for: Involvement in Wells Fargo account fraud scandal
- Board member of: The Clearing House, Financial Services Roundtable, Chevron

John Gerard Stumpf (born September 15, 1953) is an American business executive and retail banker. He was the chairman and chief executive officer of Wells Fargo, one of the Big Four banks of the United States. He was named CEO in June 2007, elected to the board of directors in June 2006, and named president in August 2005. He became chairman in January 2010. Stumpf resigned as chairman and CEO of Wells Fargo on October 12, 2016, after a scandal involving customer accounts and subsequent pressure from the public and lawmakers. He was succeeded by Timothy J. Sloan.

== Early life ==
A native of Pierz, Minnesota, Stumpf grew up as one of 11 children on a dairy and poultry farm. His father was a dairy farmer. His father is of German descent and his mother of Polish descent. He was raised Catholic. Stumpf shared a bedroom with his brothers until he was married. He graduated in the bottom half of his high school class. His first job was as a breadmaker in a Pierz bakery. After a year, Stumpf enrolled at St. Cloud State University on a provisional basis. He eventually obtained a job as a repossession agent at First Bank in St. Paul, Minnesota.

Stumpf earned his bachelor's degree in finance from St. Cloud State University and an MBA with an emphasis in finance from the University of Minnesota Carlson School of Management.

== Career ==
In 1982, Stumpf joined Northwestern National Bank, the flagship bank of Norwest Corporation. He worked in the loan administration department and then became senior vice president and chief credit officer for Norwest Bank, N.A., Minneapolis. He held a number of management positions at Norwest Bank Minneapolis and Norwest Bank Minnesota before assuming responsibility for Norwest Bank Arizona in 1989. He was named regional president for Norwest Banks in Colorado/Arizona in 1991. From 1994 to 1998 he was regional president for Norwest Bank Texas. During his four years in that position, he led Norwest's acquisition of 30 Texas banks with total assets of more than $13 billion.

Norwest merged with Wells Fargo in 1998. Norwest was the nominal survivor, but the merged bank retained the Wells Fargo name. Stumpf became head of Wells Fargo's Southwestern Banking Group (Arizona, New Mexico and Texas). Two years later he became head of the new Western Banking Group (Arizona, Colorado, Idaho, Nevada, New Mexico, Oregon, Texas, Utah, Washington and Wyoming). In 2000, he led the integration of Wells Fargo's acquisition of the $23 billion First Security Corporation, based in Salt Lake City. In May 2002, he was named Group EVP of Community Banking. In December 2008, he led one of the largest mergers in history with the purchase of Wachovia.

Stumpf became CEO of Wells Fargo in June 2007 and chairman in January 2010. In 2012, Stumpf's total compensation was $22.87 million with a base salary of $2.8 million, $3,300,000 in cash bonuses, $12.5 million in stock granted, and $15,000 in other compensation.

Stumpf served as director of National Association since June 27, 2006, and a Member of Litigation Committee at Visa Inc. After he retired, he and his wife bought a home near Mummy Mountain in Paradise Valley, Arizona.

=== Role in fake accounts scandal ===
In September 2016, Wells Fargo was fined $100 million by the Consumer Financial Protection Bureau, $50 million by the Office of the Comptroller of the Currency and $35 million by the city and county of Los Angeles, for opening two million checking and credit-card bank accounts without its customers' consent. Stumpf was grilled by angry lawmakers on Capitol Hill in hearings before the U.S. Senate Banking Committee and the House Financial Services Committee. He was accused of selling customers multiple accounts fraudulently when they did not need them, and using those results on quarterly reports for larger returns on Wells Fargo stock holdings. On September 27, The Wall Street Journal reported that the board was considering cutting back on compensation for Stumpf and former retail banking head Carrie Tolstedt. Two days later, Stumpf again appeared before Congress, declaring his intent to forfeit at least $41 million in pay. He also testified that Wells Fargo would quickly drop its sales incentive program. On January 23, 2020, Stumpf agreed to a lifetime ban from the banking industry and a $17.5 million fine for his role in the fake account scandal. In November 2020, he settled further investigations by the SEC and agreed to pay an additional civil penalty of $2.5 million. Upon leaving Wells Fargo, Stumpf's total compensation was more than $130 million. High-profile critics, including Elizabeth Warren, have called for criminal charges to be filed against him. As of June 2021, none have been filed.

=== Criticism from the Federal Reserve ===
In February 2018, Janet Yellen, on her last day as Chair of the Board of Governors of the Federal Reserve System, approved a strongly worded critical letter to Stumpf to emphasize his failures as co-chair of Wells Fargo's board of directors. The letter, signed by Michael Gibson, Director of the Division of Supervision and Regulation, cited Stumpf's complicity in ignoring the bank's poor risk management programs, and failure to initiate any serious investigation into its sales practices.
