= Wells Fargo cross-selling scandal =

Controversy generated by fraud perpetrated by Wells Fargo

The logo of Wells Fargo

The Wells Fargo cross-selling scandal was caused by the creation of millions of fraudulent savings and checking accounts on behalf of Wells Fargo clients without their consent or knowledge. The creation of these accounts was attributable to aggressive internal sales goals at Wells Fargo. News of the fraud became widely known in late 2016 after various regulatory bodies, including the Consumer Financial Protection Bureau (CFPB), fined the company a combined US$185 million as a result of the illegal activity. The company faces additional civil and criminal suits reaching an estimated $2.7 billion by the end of 2018. The creation of these unauthorized accounts continued to have legal, financial, and reputational ramifications for Wells Fargo and former bank executives for almost a decade after the initial reporting.

Wells Fargo clients began to notice the fraud after being charged unanticipated fees and receiving unexpected credit or debit cards or lines of credit. Initial reports blamed individual Wells Fargo branch workers and managers for the problem, as well as sales incentives associated with selling multiple "solutions" or financial products. This blame was later shifted to a top-down pressure from higher-level management to open as many accounts as possible through cross-selling.

The bank took relatively few risks in the years leading up to the 2008 financial crisis, which led to an image of stability on Wall Street and in the financial world. The bank's stable reputation was tarnished by the widespread fraud, the subsequent coverage, and the revelation of other fraudulent practices employed by the company. The scandal led to the resignation of CEO John Stumpf, an investigation of the company's bank-led model, a number of settlements between Wells Fargo and various parties, and pledges from new management to reform the bank.

== Background ==
=== Cross-selling ===
Cross-selling, the practice underpinning the fraud, is the concept of attempting to sell multiple products to consumers. For instance, a customer with a checking account might be encouraged to take out a mortgage, or set up a credit card or online banking account. Success by retail banks was measured in part by the average number of products held by a customer, and Wells Fargo was long considered the most successful cross-seller. Richard Kovacevich, the former CEO of Norwest Corporation and, later, Wells Fargo, allegedly invented the strategy while at Norwest. In a 1998 interview, Kovacevich likened mortgages, checking and savings accounts, and credit cards offered by the company to more typical consumer products, and revealed that he considered branch employees to be "salespeople", and citizens to be "consumers" rather than "clients". Under Kovacevich, Norwest encouraged branch employees to sell at least eight products, in an initiative known as "Going for Gr-Eight".

=== Early coverage ===
Wells Fargo's sales culture and cross-selling strategy, and their impact on customers, were documented by the Wall Street Journal as early as 2011. In 2013, a Los Angeles Times investigation revealed intense pressure on bank managers and individual bankers to produce sales against extremely aggressive, and even mathematically impossible, quotas. In the Los Angeles Times article, COO Timothy Sloan was quoted stating he was unaware of any "...overbearing sales culture". Sloan would later replace John Stumpf as CEO.

Under pressure from their supervisors, employees would often open accounts without customer consent. In an article from the American Bankruptcy Institute Journal, Wells Fargo employees reportedly "opened as many as 1.5 million checking and savings accounts, and more than 500,000 credit cards, without customers' authorization". The employees received bonuses for opening new credit cards and checking accounts and enrolling customers in products such as online banking. California Treasurer John Chiang stated: "Wells Fargo's fleecing of its customers ... demonstrates, at best, a reckless lack of institutional control and, at worst, a culture which actively promotes wanton greed."

Verschoor explains the findings of the Wells Fargo investigation show that employees also opened online banking services and ordered debit cards without customer consent. "Blame is being placed on the bank's marketing incentive plan, which set extremely high sales goals for employees to cross-sell additional banking products to existing customers whether or not the customers needed or wanted them."

In 2010, New York Department of Financial Services (NY DFS) issued the Interagency Guidance on Sound Incentive Compensation Policies. These policies monitor incentive-based compensation structures, and requires that banks appropriately balance risk and rewards, be compatible with effective controls and risk management, and that they are supported by effective corporate governance.

=== Fraud ===
Employees were encouraged to order credit cards for pre-approved customers without their consent, and to use their own contact information when filling out requests to prevent customers from discovering the fraud. Employees also created fraudulent checking and savings accounts, a process that sometimes involved the movement of money out of legitimate accounts. The creation of these additional products was made possible in part through a process known as "pinning". By setting the client's PIN to "0000", bankers were able to control client accounts and were able to enroll them in programs such as online banking.

Measures taken by employees to satisfy quotas included the enrollment of the homeless in fee-accruing financial products. Reports of unreachable goals and inappropriate conduct by employees to supervisors did not result in changes to expectations.

After the Los Angeles Times article, the bank made nominal efforts to reform the company's sales culture. Despite alleged reforms, the bank was fined $185 million in early September 2016 due to the creation of some 1,534,280 unauthorized deposit accounts and 565,433 credit-card accounts between 2011 and 2016. Later estimates, released in May 2017, placed the number of fraudulent accounts at closer to a total of 3,500,000.

In December 2016, it was revealed that employees of the bank also issued unwanted insurance policies. These included life insurance policies by Prudential Financial and renters' insurance policies by Assurant. Three whistle-blowers, Prudential employees, brought the fraud to light. Prudential later fired these employees, and announced that it might seek damages from Wells Fargo.

=== Initial fines and broader coverage ===
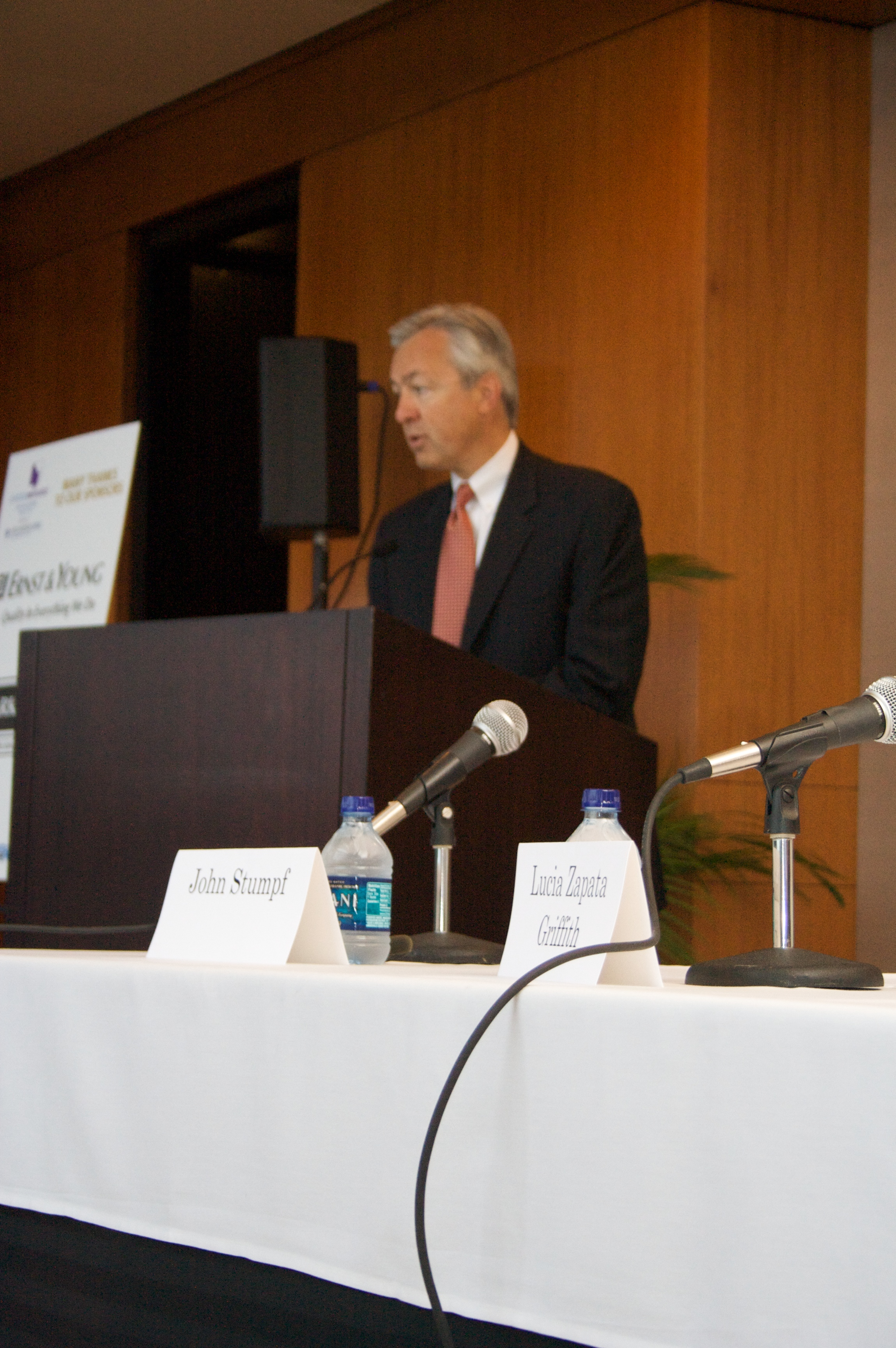
John Stumpf, former CEO of Wells Fargo

Despite the earlier coverage in the Los Angeles Times, the controversy achieved national attention only in September 2016, with the announcement by the Consumer Financial Protection Bureau that the bank would be fined $185 million for the illegal activity. The Consumer Financial Protection Bureau received $100 million, the Los Angeles City Attorney received $50 million, and the Office of the Comptroller of the Currency received the last $35 million. The fines received substantial media coverage in the following days, and triggered attention from further interested parties.

=== Initial response from Wells Fargo and management ===
After news of the fines broke, the bank placed ads in newspapers taking responsibility for the controversy. However, the bank rejected the notion that its sales culture led to the actions of employees, stating "... [the fraud] was not part of an intentional strategy". Stumpf also expressed that he would be willing to accept some personal blame for the problems.

Company executives and spokespeople referred to the problem as an issue with sales practices, rather than the company's broader culture.

== Initial impact of the fraud, legal action, and press coverage ==
=== On Wells Fargo management ===
The bank fired approximately 5300 employees between 2011 and 2016 as a result of fraudulent sales, and discontinued sales quotas at its individual branches after the announcement of the fine in September 2016. John Shrewsberry, the bank's CFO, said the bank had invested $50 million to improve oversight in individual branches. Stumpf accepted responsibility for the problems, but in September 2016, when the story broke, indicated he had no plans to resign.

Stumpf was subject to a hearing before the Senate Banking Committee on September 21, 2016, in an effort led by Senator Elizabeth Warren. Before the hearing, Stumpf agreed to forgo $41 million in stock options that had not yet vested after being urged to do so by the company's board. Stumpf resigned on October 12, roughly a month after the fines by the CFPB were announced, to be replaced by COO Timothy Sloan. Sloan indicated there had not been internal pressure for Stumpf's resignation, and that he had chosen to do so after "...deciding that the best thing for Wells Fargo to move forward was for him to retire...". In November 2016, the Office of the Comptroller of the Currency levied further penalties against the bank, removing provisions from the September settlement. As a result of the OCC adding new restrictions, the bank received oversight similar to that used for troubled or insolvent financial institutions.

Stumpf received criticism for praising former head of retail banking, Carrie Tolstedt, upon her retirement earlier in 2016, given that the bank had been conducting an investigation into retail banking practices for several years at the time. In April 2017, the bank utilized a clawback provision in Stumpf's contract to take back $28 million of his earnings. Tolstedt was also forced to forfeit earnings, though she denied involvement. Tolstedt was responsible for the pressure placed on middle management to dramatically increase the bank's "cross-sell ratio", a metric for how many accounts each customer had.

The bank experienced decreased profitability in the first quarter after the news of the scandal broke. Payments to law firms and other external advisers resulted in increased expenses. After earnings were reported in January 2017, the bank announced it would close over 400 of its approximately 6000 branches by the end of 2018. In May 2017, the bank announced that they would cut costs through investment in technology while decreasing reliance on its "sales organization". The bank also revised up its 2017 efficiency-ratio goal from 60 to 61.

=== Wells Fargo costs ===
The CFPB fined Wells Fargo $100 million on September 8, 2016, for the "widespread illegal practice of secretly opening unauthorized accounts". The order also required Wells Fargo to pay an estimated $2.5 million in refunds to customers and hire an independent consultant to review its procedures.

Wells Fargo incurred additional costs due to refunds and lawsuits:

- $6.1 million in customer refunds due to inappropriate fees and charges;
- $142 million in customer compensation due to a class-action settlement;
- $480 million settlement for a shareholder class-action lawsuit; and
- $575 million 50-state Attorneys General (AG) settlement for a combination of opening unauthorized accounts and charging for unnecessary auto insurance and mortgage fees.

The December 2018 AG settlement announcement indicated that Wells Fargo had already paid $2.3 billion in settlements and consent orders, so its $575 million settlement brought the total to nearly $3 billion.

=== On consumers ===
Approximately 85,000 of the accounts opened incurred fees, totaling $2 million. Customers' credit scores were also likely hurt by the unauthorized accounts. The bank was able to prevent customers from pursuing legal action as the opening of an account mandated customers enter into private arbitration with the bank.

The bank agreed to settle for $142 million with consumers who had accounts opened in their names without permission in March 2017. The money repaid fraudulent fees and paid damages to those affected.

=== On non-management Wells Fargo employees ===
Wells Fargo employees described intense pressure, with expectations of sales as high as 20 products a day. Others described frequent crying, levels of stress that led to vomiting, and severe panic attacks. At least one employee consumed hand sanitizer to cope with the pressure. Some indicated that calls to the company's ethics hotline either were met with no reaction or resulted in the termination of the employee making the call.

During the period of the fraud, some Wells Fargo branch-level bankers encountered difficulty gaining employment at other banks. Banks issue U5 documents to departing employees, a record of any misbehavior or unethical conduct. Wells Fargo issued defamatory U5 documents to bankers who reported branch-level malfeasance, indicating that they had been complicit in the creation of unwanted accounts, a practice that received media attention as early as 2011. There is no regulatory process to appeal a defamatory U5, other than to file a lawsuit against the issuing corporation.

Wells Fargo created a special internal group to rehire employees who had left the bank but were not implicated in the scandal. In April 2017, Timothy Sloan stated that the bank would rehire some 1000 employees who had either been wrongfully terminated or who had quit in protest of fraud. Sloan emphasized that those being rehired would not be those who had participated in the creation of fake accounts. The announcement was made shortly after the news was released that the bank had clawed back income from both Carrie Tolstedt and John Stumpf.

== Later government investigations and fines ==
=== First hearing ===
John Stumpf appeared before the Senate Banking Committee on September 20, 2016. Stumpf delivered prepared testimony and was then questioned. Senators, including Committee Chairman Richard Shelby, asked about whether the bank would clawback income from executives and how the bank would help consumers it harmed. Stumpf gave prepared testimony, but deferred from answering some of the questions, citing lack of expertise concerning the legal ramifications of the fraud.

Elizabeth Warren referred to Stumpf's leadership as "gutless" and told him he should resign. Patrick Toomey expressed doubt that the 5300 employees fired by Wells Fargo had acted independently and without orders from supervisors or management. Stumpf was later replaced as CEO by Tim Sloan, and Warren has expressed apprehension about leadership so closely associated with the period during which the fraud occurred. In October 2018, Warren urged the Fed Chairman to restrict any additional growth by Wells Fargo until Sloan is replaced as CEO.

=== Other investigations ===
Prosecutors including Preet Bharara in New York City, and others in San Francisco and North Carolina, opened their own investigations into the fraud. The Securities and Exchange Commission opened its own investigation into the bank in November 2016.

Maxine Waters, chair of the House Financial Services Committee, announced her intention to investigate the bank further in early 2019. She previously released a report about the bank's malpractice, and had called for the government to dismantle the bank. Former Wells Fargo Chairwoman Elizabeth "Betsy" Duke and James Quigley resigned on March 9, 2020, three days before House Committee on Financial Services hearings on the fraud scandal.

The Department of Justice and the Securities and Exchange Commission reached a settlement with the bank in February 2020 for a total fine of US$3 billion to address the bank's criminal and civil violations. However, this settlement does not cover any future litigation against any individual employee of the bank.

In November 2020, the SEC filed civil charges against two former senior executives, Stumpf and Tolstedt, accusing them of misrepresentation to investors of key performance metrics.

== External reactions ==
=== Divestitures by major clients ===
In September 2016, California suspended its relationship with the bank. John Chiang, the California State Treasurer, immediately removed the bank as bookrunner on two municipal bond issuings, suspended investments in Wells Fargo, and removed the bank as the state's broker dealer. Chiang cited the company's disregard for the well-being of Californians as the reason for the decision, and indicated the suspension would last for a year. Chiang later extended these sanctions against the bank to last for a second year, citing the "... opaque manner with which the bank continues to do business and the frequency of new disclosures of wanton greed and lack of institutional control" as his reasons for doing so.

The city of Chicago also divested $25 million invested with Wells Fargo in the same month as the actions taken by the state of California. Additionally, Chicago alderman Edward M. Burke introduced a measure barring the city from doing business with the bank for two years.

Other cities and municipalities that have either replaced or sought to replace Wells Fargo include Philadelphia, which uses the bank to process payroll, and the state of Illinois. Seattle also ended its relationship with the bank in an effort led by Kshama Sawant. In addition to the account controversy, Seattle cited the company's support of the Dakota Access Pipeline as a reason to end its relationship.

=== Lawsuit by Navajo Nation ===
The Navajo Nation sued Wells Fargo in December 2017. The lawsuit claims Wells Fargo employees told elderly members of the Navajo nation who did not speak English that checks could only be cashed if they had Wells Fargo savings accounts. Wells Fargo was the only bank that operated on a national scale with operations with the Navajo Nation. Wells Fargo settled with the Navajo Nation for $6.5 million in August 2019.

=== From the media ===
Wells Fargo survived the Great Recession more or less unharmed, even acquiring and rescuing a failing bank, Wachovia, and the scandal tarnished the bank's reputation for relatively prudent management when compared to other large banks. Politicians on both the left and the right, including Elizabeth Warren and Jeb Hensarling have called for investigation beyond that done by the CFPB.

Many reacted with surprise both to Stumpf's initial unwillingness to resign and the bank's blaming the problem on lower-level employees.

In a fall 2019 article, management professor William Tayler and doctoral student Michael Harris analyzed the scandal as an example of the surrogation phenomenon.

== Legacy at Wells Fargo and long-term impact ==
=== Leadership implications ===
Tim Sloan, who became CEO after Stumpf, later resigned in March 2019 under pressure related to the scandal. He was replaced by Charles Scharf, the former CEO of both Visa and BNY Mellon. Scharf was appointed with the expectation that he would rehabilitate the bank's reputation with regulators, having previously overseen turnaround efforts at BNY Mellon. As of October 2020, Scharf had not introduced a comprehensive plan to address the problems faced by the bank; this plan, announced in January 2021, was received skeptically by industry analysts.

John Shrewsberry, CFO of the bank since 2014, announced his retirement in mid-2020. Mike Santomassimo, a "lieutenant" of Scharf's from BNY, replaced him.

=== Financial and business implications ===
As of 2020, the ongoing regulatory scrutiny faced by Wells Fargo in response to the scandal continued to weigh on the bank's performance. A growth cap, placed on Wells Fargo by the Federal Reserve, complemented by low interest rates, has made recovery difficult. To reduce costs, executives under Scharf began reevaluating the bank's lines of business in an effort to trim or dispose of those outside its core offerings. The first major implication of this refocus was the sale of the bank's student loan business in December 2020 to private equity firms Apollo and Blackstone. As early as October 2020, Wells Fargo was reported to be pursuing a sale of its asset management business, hoping to sell the entire division in a single transaction. Potential bidders for the asset management business include Minneapolis-based Ameriprise and Canadian investment management firm CI Financial.

To better address its issues with compliance after news of the fraud broke, Wells Fargo's management teams relied on external consultants and law firms. Firms hired by the bank to oversee compliance initially included McKinsey and Promontory Financial Group; these were later replaced by Oliver Wyman and PricewaterhouseCoopers. In mid-2020, CEO Charlie Scharf announced commitments to reducing the amount of authority conceded to these firms, in part to trim spending on external counsel as high as $758 million a quarter. An employee, quoted in Financial Times, referred to the bank's degree of reliance on consultants as "off the charts" and even "comical".

The cuts to spending on consultants were announced at the same time as other cost-saving measures, chief among them layoffs.

In 2023, the Office of the Comptroller of the Currency made comments about breaking up large banks that could not come into compliance with regulations. These comments were interpreted as being directed at banks including Wells Fargo. The same year, Wells Fargo settled for $1 billion with shareholders as they alleged that the bank was slow to get to regulatory compliance, which they said negatively impacted stock prices.

=== Workplace culture ===
In early 2019, employees at the bank indicated goals remained unrealistic.

=== Rebranding ===
On May 6, 2018, Wells Fargo launched an integrated marketing campaign called "Re-Established" to emphasize the company's commitment to re-establishing trust with existing and potential customers. The television commercial opens with the bank's origins in the Old West, references the scandal and fast-forwards to depict bank employees and customers.

Roughly a year later, in January 2019, the company announced another overhaul of their image, in a campaign called "This is Wells Fargo".

== 2023 allegations ==
In August 2023, NBC News reported new allegations that since 2022, accounts have been created without the knowledge of their ostensible owners. The origin of the accounts has not been made clear.

== Contemporaneous allegations ==
In April 2018, new allegations against Wells Fargo were reported, including signing unwitting customers up for unnecessary auto insurance policies, with the possibility of an additional $1 billion fine. The company later paid this fine. The bank has also faced an investigation into the sales practices employed by the company's financial advisors.
