= Bel canto =

Italian musical term meaning "beautiful singing"

Bel canto (Italian for 'beautiful singing' / 'beautiful song', Italian: [ˈbɛl ˈkanto])—with several similar constructions (belcanto, bellezze del canto, bell'arte del canto, pronounced in American English as /bɛl ˈkɑːntoʊ/)—is a term with several meanings that relate to Italian singing, and whose definitions have often been misunderstood.

The phrase was not associated with a school of singing until the middle of the 19th century, when writers in the early 1860s used it nostalgically to describe a manner of singing that had begun to wane around 1830. Bel canto was not only seen as a vocal technique, but also as a source of national pride for Italians, specifically in how the musical qualities aligned with their identity. However, this pride was often complicated by political circumstances.

Nonetheless, "neither musical nor general dictionaries saw fit to attempt [a] definition [of bel canto] until after 1900". The term remains vague and ambiguous in the 21st century and is often used to evoke a lost singing tradition.

== History of the term and its various definitions ==
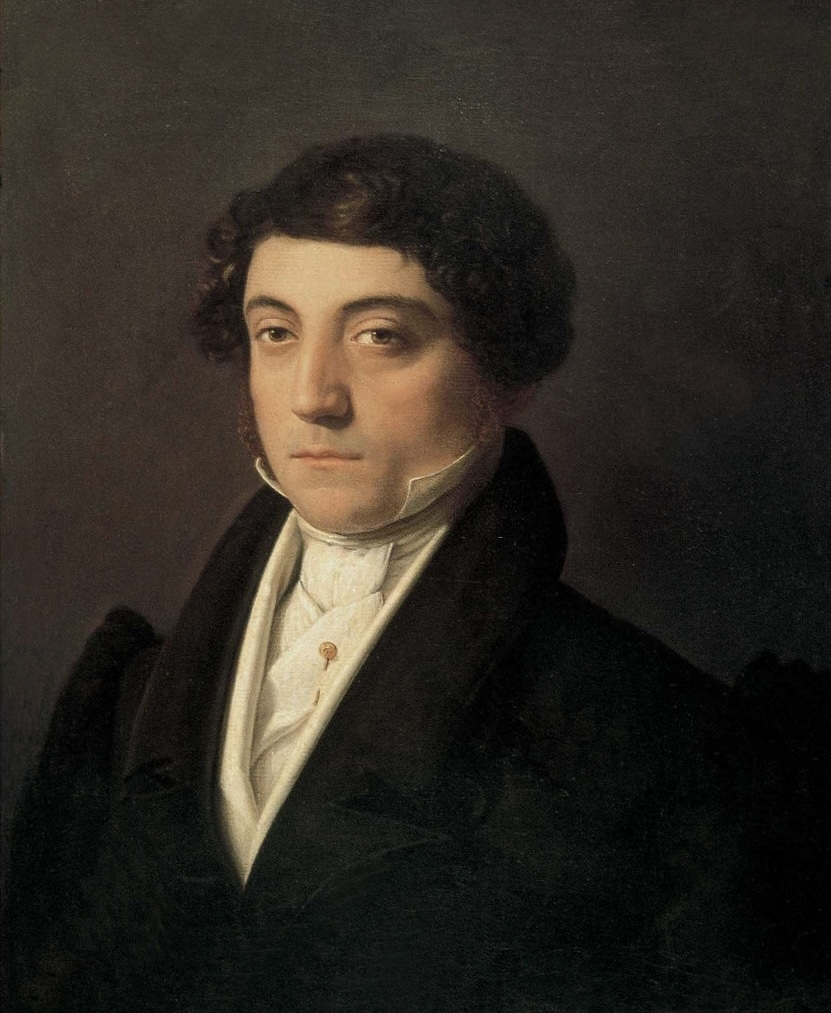
Bel canto–era composer Gioachino Rossini

As generally understood today, the term bel canto refers to the Italian-originated vocal style that prevailed throughout most of Europe during the 18th and early 19th centuries. Late 19th- and 20th-century sources "would lead us to believe that bel canto was restricted to beauty and evenness of tone, legato phrasing, and skill in executing highly florid passages, but contemporary documents [those of the late 18th and early 19th centuries] describe a multifaceted manner of performance far beyond these confines". The main features of the bel canto style were:

- prosodic singing (use of accent and emphasis)
- matching register and tonal quality of the voice to the emotional content of the words
- a highly articulated manner of phrasing based on the insertion of grammatical and rhetorical pauses
- a delivery varied by several types of legato and staccato
- a liberal application of more than one type of portamento
- messa di voce as the principal source of expression (Domenico Corri called it the "soul of music")
- frequent alteration of tempo through rhythmic rubato and the quickening and slowing of the overall time
- the introduction of a wide variety of graces and divisions into both arias and recitatives
- gesture as a powerful tool for enhancing the effect of the vocal delivery
- vibrato primarily reserved for heightening the expression of certain words and for gracing longer notes.

The Harvard Dictionary of Music by Willi Apel says that bel canto denotes "the Italian vocal technique of the 18th century, with its emphasis on beauty of sound and brilliance of performance rather than dramatic expression or romantic emotion. In spite of the repeated reactions against bel canto (or its abuses, such as display for its own sake; Gluck, Wagner) and the frequent exaggeration of its virtuoso element (coloratura), it must be considered as a highly artistic technique and the only proper one for Italian opera and for Mozart. Its early development is closely bound up with that of the Italian opera seria (A. Scarlatti, N. Porpora, J. A. Hasse, N. Jommelli, N. Piccinni)."

=== 18th and early 19th centuries ===
Since the bel canto style flourished in the 18th and early 19th centuries, the music of Handel and his contemporaries, as well as that of Mozart and Rossini, benefits from an application of bel canto principles. Operas received the most dramatic use of the techniques, but the bel canto style applies equally to oratorio, though in a somewhat less flamboyant way. The da capo arias these works contained provided challenges for singers, as the repeat of the opening section prevented the story line from progressing. Nonetheless, singers needed to keep the emotional drama moving forward, and so they used the principles of bel canto to help them render the repeated material in a new emotional guise. They also incorporated embellishments of all sorts (Domenico Corri said da capo arias were invented for that purpose, but not every singer was equipped to do this, some writers, notably Domenico Corri himself, suggesting that singing without ornamentation was an acceptable practice. Singers regularly embellished both arias and recitatives, but did so by tailoring their embellishments to the prevailing sentiments of the piece.

Two famous 18th-century teachers of the style were Antonio Bernacchi (1685–1756) and Nicola Porpora (1686–1768), but many others existed. A number of these teachers were castrati. Singer/author John Potter declares in his book Tenor: History of a Voice that:

For much of the 18th century castrati defined the art of singing; it was the loss of their irrecoverable skills that in time created the myth of bel canto, a way of singing and conceptualizing singing that was entirely different from anything that the world had heard before or would hear again.

=== 19th-century Italy and France ===
In another application, the term bel canto is sometimes attached to Italian operas written by Vincenzo Bellini (1801–1835) and Gaetano Donizetti (1797–1848). These composers wrote bravura works for the stage during what musicologists sometimes call the "bel canto era". But the style of singing had started to change around 1830, Michael Balfe writing of the new method of teaching that was required for the music of Bellini and Donizetti (A New Universal Method of Singing, 1857, p. iii), and so the operas of Bellini and Donizetti actually were the vehicles for a new era of singing. The last important opera role for a castrato was written in 1824 by Giacomo Meyerbeer (1791–1864).

The phrase "bel canto" was not commonly used until the latter part of the 19th century, when it was set in opposition to the development of a weightier, more powerful style of speech-inflected singing associated with German opera and, above all, Richard Wagner's revolutionary music dramas. Wagner (1813–1883) decried the Italian singing model, alleging that it was concerned merely with "whether that G or A will come out roundly". He advocated a new, Germanic school of singing that would draw "the spiritually energetic and profoundly passionate into the orbit of its matchless Expression."

French musicians and composers never embraced the more florid extremes of the 18th-century Italian bel canto style. They disliked the castrato voice and because they placed a premium on the clear enunciation of the texts of their vocal music, they objected to the sung word being obscured by excessive fioritura.

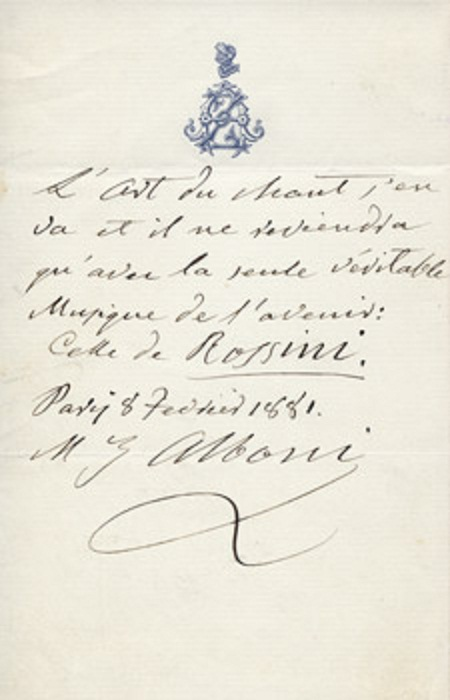
Hand-written note by contralto Marietta Alboni about the decay of bel canto in the late 19th century. The French text reads: "The art of singing is going, and it will only revert with the sole real music of the future: that of Rossini. Paris, 8 February 1881." (signature)

The popularity of the bel canto style as espoused by Rossini, Donizetti and Bellini faded in Italy during the mid-19th century. It was overtaken by a heavier, more ardent, less embroidered approach to singing that was necessary to perform the innovative works of Giuseppe Verdi (1813–1901) with maximum dramatic impact. Tenors, for instance, began to inflate their tone and deliver the high C (and even the high D) directly from the chest rather than resorting to a suave head voice/falsetto as they had done previously – sacrificing vocal agility in the process. Sopranos and baritones reacted in a similar fashion to their tenor colleagues when confronted with Verdi's drama-filled compositions. They subjected the mechanics of their voice production to greater pressures and cultivated the exciting upper part of their respective ranges at the expense of their mellow but less penetrant lower notes. Initially at least, the singing techniques of 19th-century contraltos and basses were less affected by the musical innovations of Verdi, which were built upon by his successors Amilcare Ponchielli (1834–1886), Arrigo Boito (1842–1918) and Alfredo Catalani (1854–1893).

=== Detractors ===
One reason for the eclipse of the old Italian singing model was the growing influence within the music world of bel canto's detractors, who considered it to be outmoded and condemned it as vocalization devoid of content. To others, however, bel canto became the vanished art of elegant, refined, sweet-toned musical utterance. Rossini lamented in a conversation that took place in Paris in 1858 that: "Alas for us, we have lost our bel canto". Similarly, the so-called German style was as derided as much as it was heralded. In the introduction to a collection of songs by Italian masters published in 1887 in Berlin under the title Il bel canto, Franz Sieber wrote: "In our time, when the most offensive shrieking under the extenuating device of 'dramatic singing' has spread everywhere, when the ignorant masses appear much more interested in how loud rather than how beautiful the singing is, a collection of songs will perhaps be welcome which – as the title purports – may assist in restoring bel canto to its rightful place."

In the late-19th century and early-20th century, the term bel canto was resurrected by singing teachers in Italy, among whom the retired Verdi baritone Antonio Cotogni (1831–1918) was a pre-eminent figure. Cotogni and his followers invoked it against an unprecedentedly vehement and vibrato-laden style of vocalism that singers increasingly used after around 1890 to meet the impassioned demands of verismo writing by composers such as Giacomo Puccini (1858–1924), Ruggero Leoncavallo (1857–1919), Pietro Mascagni (1863–1945), Francesco Cilea (1866–1950) and Umberto Giordano (1867–1948), as well as the auditory challenges posed by the non-Italianate stage works of Richard Strauss (1864–1949) and other late-romantic/early-modern era composers, with their strenuous and angular vocal lines and frequently dense orchestral textures.

During the 1890s, the directors of the Bayreuth Festival initiated a particularly forceful style of Wagnerian singing that was totally at odds with the Italian ideals of bel canto. Called "Sprechgesang" by its proponents (and dubbed the "Bayreuth bark" by some opponents), the new Wagnerian style prioritized articulation of the individual words of the composer's libretti over legato delivery. This text-based, anti-legato approach to vocalism spread across the German-speaking parts of Europe prior to World War I.

As a result of these many factors, the concept of bel canto became shrouded in mystique and confused by a plethora of individual notions and interpretations. To complicate matters further, German musicology in the early 20th century invented its own historical application for bel canto, using the term to denote the simple lyricism that came to the fore in Venetian opera and the Roman cantata during the 1630s and '40s (the era of composers Antonio Cesti, Giacomo Carissimi and Luigi Rossi) as a reaction against the earlier, text-dominated stile rappresentativo. This anachronistic use of the term bel canto was given wide circulation in Robert Haas's Die Musik des Barocks and, later, in Manfred Bukofzer's Music in the Baroque Era. Since the singing style of later 17th-century Italy did not differ in any marked way from that of the 18th century and early 19th century, a connection can be drawn; but, according to Jander, most musicologists agree that the term is best limited to its mid-19th-century use, designating a style of singing that emphasized beauty of tone and technical expertise in the delivery of music that was either highly florid or featured long, flowing and difficult-to-sustain passages of cantilena.

== Revival ==
In the 1950s, the phrase "bel canto revival" was coined to refer to a renewed interest in the operas of Donizetti, Rossini and Bellini. These composers had begun to go out of fashion during the latter years of the 19th century and their works, while never completely disappearing from the performance repertoire, were staged infrequently during the first half of the 20th century, when the operas of Wagner, Verdi and Puccini held sway. That situation changed significantly after World War II with the advent of a group of enterprising orchestral conductors and the emergence of a fresh generation of singers such as Maria Callas, Joan Sutherland, Leyla Gencer, Montserrat Caballé, Beverly Sills and Marilyn Horne, who had acquired bel canto techniques. These artists breathed new life into Donizetti, Rossini and Bellini's stage compositions, treating them seriously as music and re-popularizing them throughout Europe and America. Today, some of the world's most frequently performed operas, such as Rossini's The Barber of Seville and Donizetti's Lucia di Lammermoor, are from the bel canto era.

Many 18th-century operas that require adroit bel canto skills have also experienced post-war revivals, ranging from lesser-known Mozart and Haydn to extensive Baroque works by Handel, Vivaldi and others.

== Teaching legacy ==
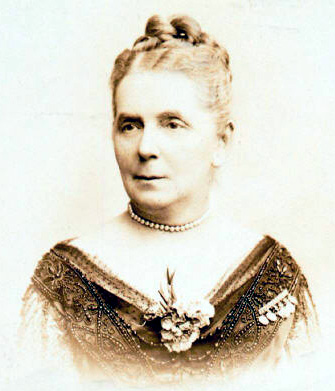
Mathilde Marchesi (1821–1913), a leading Paris-based teacher of bel canto sopranos

Musicologists occasionally apply the label "bel canto technique" to the arsenal of virtuosic vocal accomplishments and concepts imparted by singing teachers to their students during the late 18th century and the early 19th century. Many of these teachers were castrati.

"All [their] pedagogical works follow the same structure, beginning with exercises on single notes and eventually progressing to scales and improvised embellishments" writes Potter who continues, "The really creative ornamentation required for cadenzas, involving models and formulae that could generate newly improvised material, came towards the end of the process."

Today's pervasive idea that singers should refrain from improvising and always adhere strictly to the letter of a composer's published score is a comparatively recent phenomenon, promulgated during the first decades of the 20th century by dictatorial conductors such as Arturo Toscanini (1867–1957), who championed the dramatic operas of Verdi and Wagner and believed in keeping performers on a tight interpretive leash. This is noted by both Potter and Michael Scott.

Potter notes, however, that as the 19th century unfurled:

The general tendency ... was for singers not to have been taught by castrati (there were few of them left) and for serious study to start later, often at one of the new conservatories rather than with a private teacher. The traditional techniques and pedagogy were still acknowledged, but the teaching was generally in the hands of tenors and baritones who were by then at least once removed from the tradition itself.

Early 19th-century teachers described the voice as being made up of three registers. The chest register was the lowest of the three and the head register the highest, with the passaggio in between. These registers needed to be smoothly blended and fully equalized before a trainee singer could acquire total command of his or her natural instrument, and the surest way to achieve this outcome was for the trainee to practise vocal exercises assiduously. Bel canto–era teachers were great believers in the benefits of vocalise and solfeggio. They strove to strengthen the respiratory muscles of their pupils and equip them with such time-honoured vocal attributes as "purity of tone, perfection of legato, phrasing informed by eloquent portamento, and exquisitely turned ornaments", as noted in the introduction to Volume 2 of Scott's The Record of Singing.

Major refinements occurred to the existing system of voice classification during the 19th century as the international operatic repertoire diversified, split into distinctive nationalist schools and expanded in size. Whole new categories of singers such as mezzo-soprano and Wagnerian bass-baritone arose towards the end of the 19th century, as did such new sub-categories as lyric coloratura soprano, dramatic soprano and spinto soprano, and various grades of tenor, stretching from lyric through spinto to heroic. These classificatory changes have had a lasting effect on how singing teachers designate voices and opera house managements cast productions.

There was, however, no across-the-board uniformity among 19th-century bel canto adherents in passing on their knowledge and instructing students. Each had their own training regimes and pet notions. Fundamentally, though, they all subscribed to the same set of bel canto precepts, and the exercises that they devised to enhance breath support, dexterity, range, and technical control remain valuable and, indeed, some teachers still use them.

Manuel García (1805–1906), author of the influential treatise L'Art du chant, was the most prominent of the group of pedagogues that perpetuated bel-canto principles in teachings and writings during the second half of the 19th century. His like-minded younger sister, Pauline Viardot (1821–1910), was also an important teacher of voice, as were Viardot's contemporaries Mathilde Marchesi, Camille Everardi, Julius Stockhausen, Carlo Pedrotti, Venceslao Persichini, Giovanni Sbriglia, Melchiorre Vidal and Francesco Lamperti (together with Francesco's son Giovanni Battista Lamperti). The voices of a number of their former students can be heard on acoustic recordings made in the first two decades of the 20th century and re-issued since on LP and CD. Some examples on disc of historically and artistically significant 19th-century singers whose vocal styles and techniques exemplify bel canto ideals include the following:

Sir Charles Santley (born 1834), Gustav Walter (born 1834), Adelina Patti (born 1843), Marianne Brandt (born 1842), Lilli Lehmann (born 1848), Jean Lassalle (born 1847), Victor Maurel (born 1848), Marcella Sembrich (born 1858), Lillian Nordica (born 1857), Emma Calvé (born 1858), Nellie Melba (born 1861), Francesco Tamagno (born 1850), Francesco Marconi (born 1853), Léon Escalais (born 1859), Mattia Battistini (born 1856), Mario Ancona (born 1860), Pol Plançon (born 1851), and Antonio Magini-Coletti and Francesco Navarini (both born 1855).

== Quotations ==
- "There are no registers in the human singing voice, when it is accurately produced. According to natural laws the voice is made up of one register, which constitutes its entire range."
- "Bel-canto is not a school of sensuously pretty voice-production. It has come to be a generally recognised thing that voice, pure and simple, by its very composition, or "placing", interferes with the organs of speech; making it impossible for a vocalist to preserve absolute purity of pronunciation in song as well as in speech. It is because of this view that the principle of "vocalising" words, instead of musically "saying" them, crept in, to the detriment of vocal art. This false position is due to the idea that the 'Arte del bel-canto' encouraged mere sensuous beauty of voice, rather than truth of expression."
- "Bel-canto (of which we read so much) meant, and means, versatility of tone; if a man wish to be called an artist, his voice must become the instrument of intelligent imagination. Perhaps there would be fewer cases of vocal-specialising if the modern craze for 'voice-production' (apart from linguistic truth) could be reduced. This wondrous pursuit is, as things stand, a notable instance of putting the cart before the horse. Voices are 'produced' and 'placed' in such wise that pupils are trained to 'vocalise' (to use technical jargon) the words; i.e., they are taught to make a sound which is indeed something like but is not the word in its purity. 'Tone' or sound is what the average student seeks, ab initio, and not verbal purity. Hence the monotony of modern singing. When one hears an average singer in one rôle, one hears him in all."
- "Those who regard the art of singing as anything more than a means to an end, do not comprehend the true purpose of that art, much less can they hope ever to fulfil that purpose. The true purpose of singing is to give utterance to certain hidden depths in our nature which can be adequately expressed in no other way. The voice is the only vehicle perfectly adapted to this purpose; it alone can reveal to us our inmost feelings, because it is our only direct means of expression. If the voice, more than any language, more than any other instrument of expression, can reveal to us our own hidden depths, and convey those depths to other souls of men, it is because voice vibrates directly to the feeling itself, when it fulfils its 'natural' mission. By fulfilling its natural mission, I mean, when voice is not hindered from vibrating to the feeling by artificial methods of tone production, which methods include certain mental processes which are fatal to spontaneity. To sing should always mean to have some definite feeling to express."
- "The decline of Bel Canto may be attributed in part to Ferrein and García who, with a dangerously small and historically premature knowledge of laryngeal function, abandoned the intuitive and emotional insight of the anatomically blind singers."
- "Voice Culture has not progressed ... Exactly the contrary has taken place. Before the introduction of mechanical methods every earnest vocal student was sure of learning to use his voice properly, and of developing the full measure of his natural endowments. Mechanical instruction has upset all this. Nowadays the successful vocal student is the exception."
