= Agnes Huntington =

American operatic singer

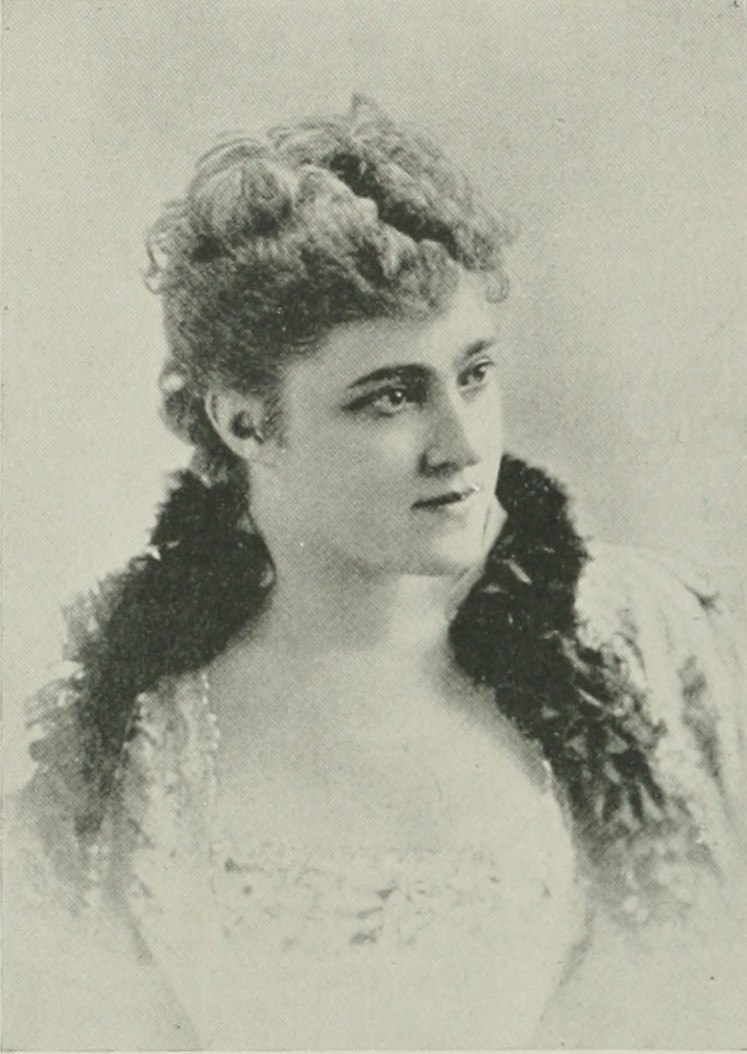
Agnes Huntington from A Woman of the Century, 1893

Agnes Huntington (later, Agnes Huntington Cravath; ca. 1864 – March 10, 1953) was an American operatic singer. For several years, she received private tutoring in Europe for music, languages, and drawing. She had a notable career in concert and opera as a prima donna contralto.

== Early years and education ==
Agnes Huntington was born in Kalamazoo, Michigan, in ca. 1864. (Note: Leonard (1914) gives the year of birth as 1862.) She was the daughter of Charles E. and Fannie E. (Munsell) Huntington and was raised by them in New York City.

She was educated at Mrs. Sylvanus Reed's School for Girls in New York City. In 1880, her family decided that she should follow a career of her own choosing. She hesitated to choose between music and art, for both were attractive to her, and she finally decided to become an operatic singer. Her rich contralto voice was inherited from her mother.

Huntington went to Dresden in 1880, where she studied for four years (Note: Leonard (1914) states she studied for 3.5 years with Lamperti.) with Giovanni Battista Lamperti. Said Huntington:—

"If I had indulged in any vanity regarding my musical talent, founded upon my two years' musical instruction in America, my maestro, G. B. Lamperti, scattered it like snow-flakes on a windy wintry day, when he gravely assured me, on my vocal examination, that I at least had acquired no bad vocal habits, and that my voice was in a fair condition for rapid development. If I had much to learn, I had nothing to unlearn. I was in this respect better off than many, and there was consolation in this fact. These years of preparation were no child's play. They were years of constant and hard work, and of the many who began with me, few remained the four years. I do not now begrudge one moment I spent in the laborious study of vocal technique. The benefits I have derived from my patience and labor have been too numerous to detail."

== Career ==
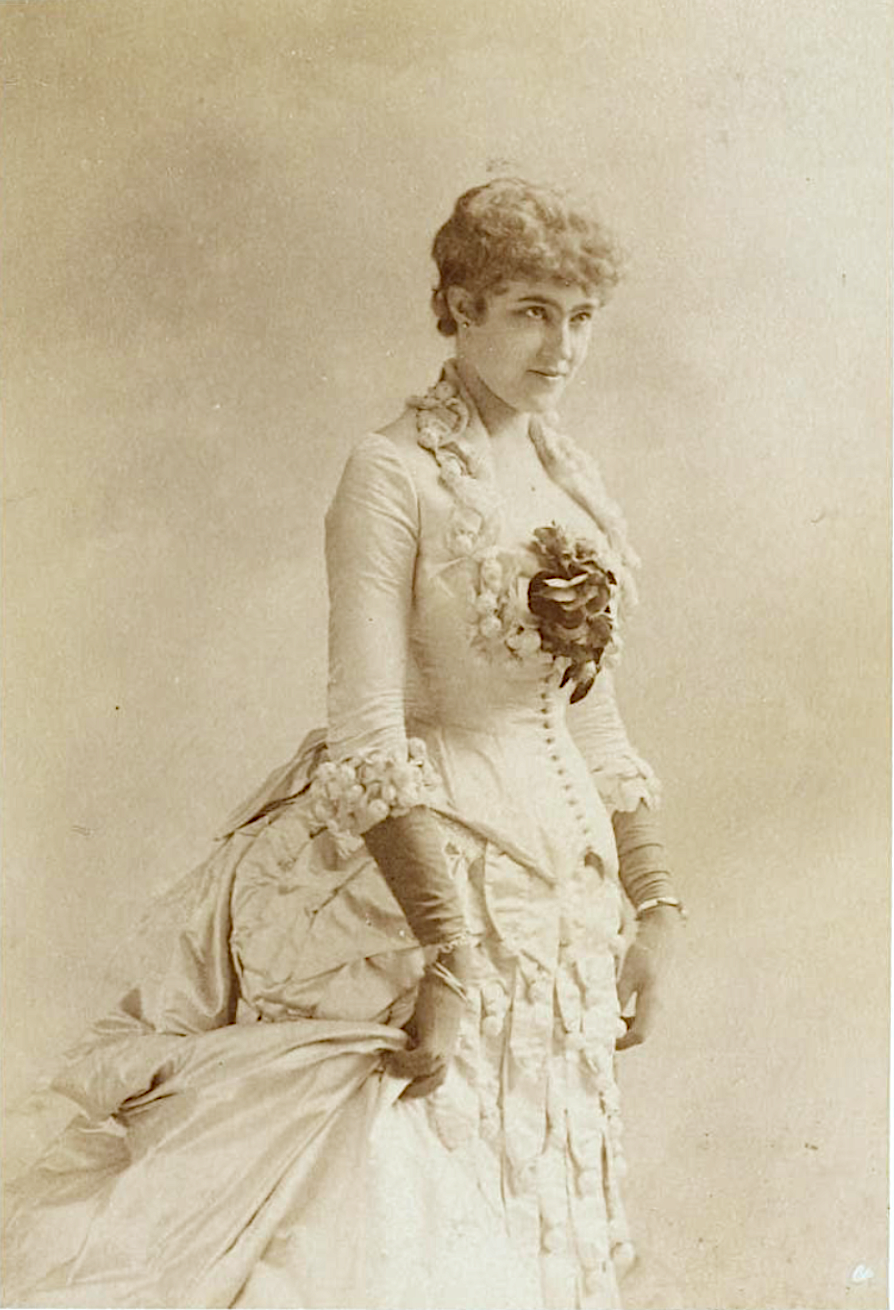
Agnes Huntington

Huntington made her first public appearance in concert in Dresden, in January, 1884, and a few weeks later, sang at the Gewandhaus in Leipzig with the regular orchestra under direction of Carl Reinecke. Later appearances were in Stuttgart with Joseph Joachim (Hungarian violinist), then with Pablo de Sarasate (Spanish violinist), and Klintworth and his orchestra at the Sing-Akademie zu Berlin. She next appeared in a concert given by Alexandre Guilmant and Édouard Colonne and his Concerts Colonne orchestra at the Trocadéro in Paris. Later, she appeared in concerts in London in association with musicians and conductors, including Sir Julius Benedict, Wilhelm Ganz, Alberto Randegger, Sir George Grove and others, which brought her social attention. At this time, she received from the then Princess of Wales (later, the Dowager Queen Alexandra) a brooch of precious stones. She also sang in Paris.

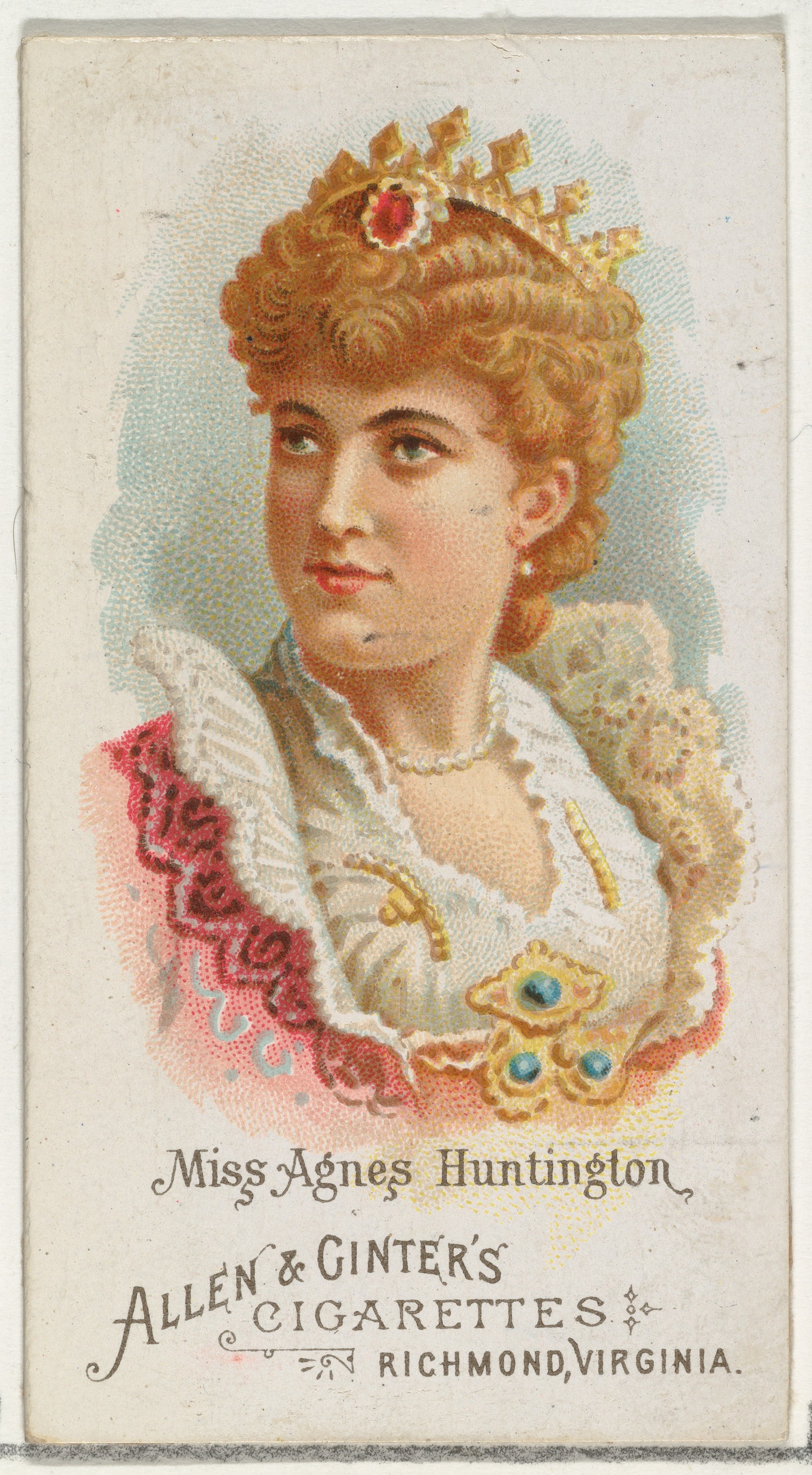
Agnes Huntington (1888)

In 1885, she made her American debut with the New York Philharmonic Orchestra, under the direction of Theodore Thomas, who engaged her for the Philadelphia Symphony Orchestra and other concerts, of which he was the conductor. She also sang with the Boston Symphony Orchestra with William Goricke, the Oratorio Society of New York with Walter Damrosch, and in many of the major festivals under prominent conductors in the U.S. and Canada. After making a tour of the principal cities, she joined the Boston Ideal Opera Company, and with that company, she sang for several seasons. Next, she sang with the Bostonians, in which she visited the principal cities of the United States and Canada, appearing in the leading roles of the standard operas, for which her contralto voice suited her. With the Bostonians, she gained experience in acting, singing in Martha, Giralda, Fra Diavolo, Les Mousquetaires de la reine, The Bohemian Girl, Mignon, and others.

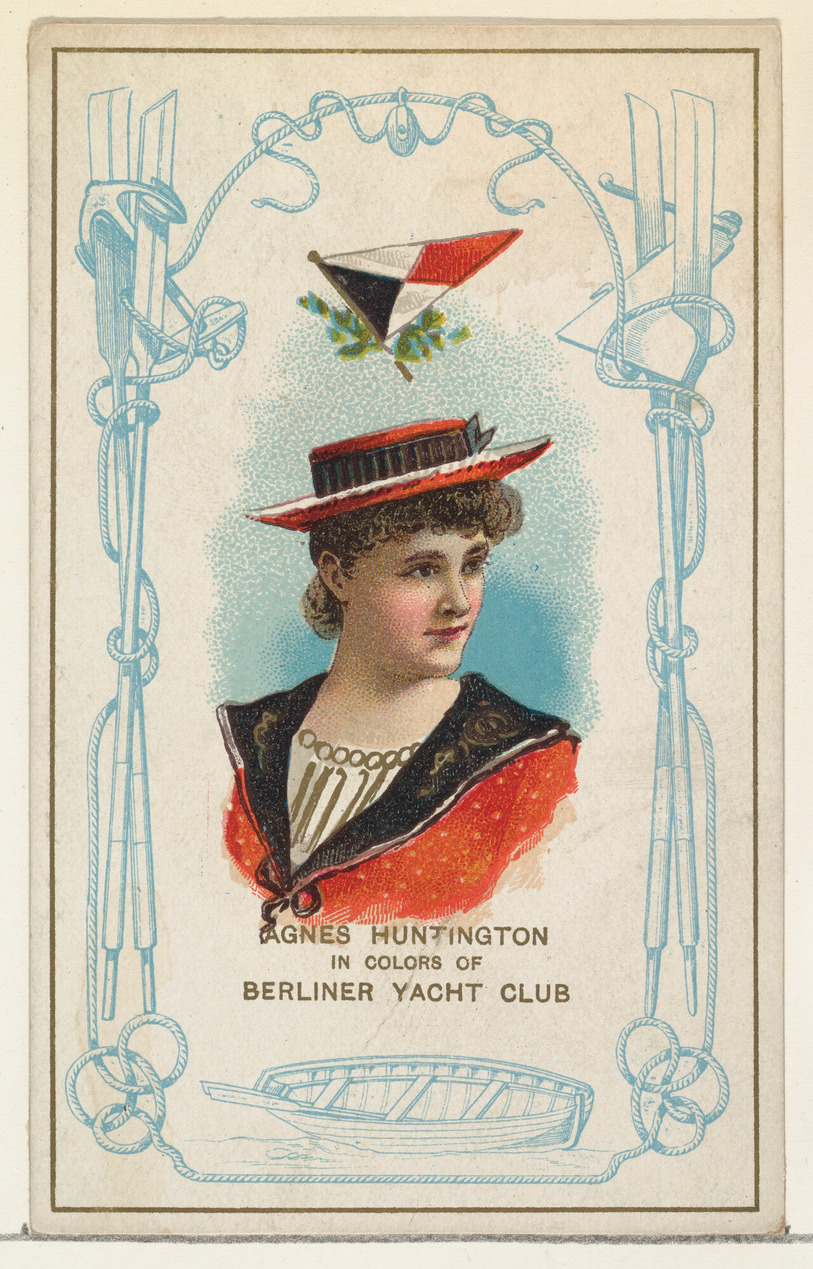
Agnes Huntington (1890)

In 1889 she went to London, under the management of the Carl Rosa Opera Company, having signed for a season of concert, oratorio, and light opera. There, she created the title role in Paul Jones by Robert Planquette, in which she made a hit. Originally put on for a short run, Paul Jones remained on the boards during 346 nights in the Prince of Wales Theatre, and at every performance the house was crowded. A dispute with her managers led her to leave the company, and she returned to the U.S.

When Huntington's year in London was finished, she determined to become a star and produce her own operas. Under the management of Marcus Mayer she began her career as a star in Paul Jones in New York, and she could have selected no better production. She asserted that her short experience convinced her that the public had grown tired of coarse fun and vulgarity and would patronize opéra comique that was clean and pure, with a story to tell, a consistent plot to unfold, and ennobled with good music and well-concerted orchestration, and that her ventures were made upon this assumption.

The ambition of Huntington as a caterer of operatic productions for the entertainment of the public led her to constant novelty and progressiveness, and as a result, she presented Planquette's work, Captain Therese. As Huntington personally superintended all of her own productions in every detail, the amount of labor which devolves upon her may be imagined, and her own description of her work in this respect was thus:—

"In every production, the most careful regard must be paid to historical unity and accuracy. The time, the place, and the scene represented, as well as the costumes and properties, must all correspond in detail to produce a perfect combined effect. I select my scenic designs and costumes from plates and paintings of the scene and time represented. The properties are modelled after antiques. These are all preliminaries, however. The selection and rehearsal of a company are the most exacting demands, and when the company is a large one, aggregating upwards of sixty people, the task is the most trying one imaginable. I recall the hot sultry days of last September, when we were rehearsing Captain Therese. When every one who could afford it was at sea-shore or mountain retreat, in a hot, stifling, empty theatre by day and night I was rehearsing with my company, striving to obtain perfection out of seeming chaos. Musical bars and passages would be slurred, involving endless repetition, and details would be forgotten, only to be repeated without end."

In all her travels, Huntington was accompanied by her mother, who proved to be her best friend and advisor, and between the two there existed the utmost devotion. With her company, Huntington is well-known. If she is a strict disciplinarian, she is also generous, and the slightest complaint of any wrong or oversight finds her always a willing listener and quick to rectify any error. On the occasion of the disbandment of her company in 1891, a list was presented to her of the fines inflicted upon several of the members during its continuance for tardiness and oversights. In some cases, these amounted to considerable sums. She remitted every fine, paid her company in full, and re-engaged its members on the spot.

She also spent her time responding to the many letters she had received from girls who sought advice about becoming an actress. She did not encourage anyone with false hopes, and she represented the labour of stage life fully and clearly.

Huntington was considered at the time to be tall, fair and of commanding presence. She sang as a contralto in most of the performances she sang in, and in London, she developed her social life significantly. Among her intimate friends, there were the Baroness Burdett-Coutts, and the Duchess of Westminster. She served as director of the New York Symphony Society, and the Institute of Musical Arts.

== Personal life ==
On November 15, 1892, in Saint Thomas Church, Manhattan, she married attorney Paul Drennan Cravath, with whom she had one daughter, Vera Agnes Huntington Cravath (b. 1895). Following marriage, she became a director of several charities, and contributed to many charitable societies. She was an animal activist, and a member of the Colony Club. Huntington was Episcopalian, and opposed women's suffrage.

As reported on page one of The New York Times, the couple became legally and permanently separated, in 1926, while remaining married. Their daughter, then separated from her first husband, moved in with her father, until her second marriage the following year.

She resided at 105 E. Thirty-ninth Street, in New York City, with a country estate in Locust Valley, Long Island, New York. Huntington died in Manhattan, on March 10, 1953.
