= List of operas by Adolphe Adam =

This is a list of operas by Adolphe Adam (1803–1856). Unless otherwise noted, all premieres took place in Paris.

Best known for his opéras comiques, of which he wrote 36, Adam actually began his career with a series of 19 vaudevilles. He also composed three opéras, two opérettes, two pasticcios, one drame lyrique, one opéra-ballet and one scène-prologue, in addition to works variously designated as drama, drama with songs, historical melodrama and military spectacle.

== List ==
Title	Genre	Subdivisions	Libretto	Premiere date	Theatre
Pierre et Marie, ou Le soldat ménétrier	vaudeville	1 act	Charles Dupeuty and Ferdinand de Villeneuve	22 January 1824	Théâtre Gymnase-Dramatique
Le baiser au porteur	vaudeville	1 act	Eugène Scribe	9 June 1824	Théâtre Gymnase-Dramatique
Le bal champêtre	vaudeville	1 act	Eugène Scribe and Henri Dupin	21 October 1824	Théâtre Gymnase-Dramatique
La haine d'une femme	vaudeville	1 act	Eugène Scribe	14 December 1824	Théâtre Gymnase-Dramatique
L'exilé	vaudeville	2 acts		9 July 1825	Théâtre du Vaudeville
La dame jaune	vaudeville	1 act	Pierre-Frédéric-Adolphe Carmouche and Édouard-Joseph-Ennemond Mazères	7 March 1826	Théâtre du Vaudeville
L'oncle d'Amérique	vaudeville	1 act	Eugène Scribe and Édouard-Joseph-Ennemond Mazères	14 March 1826	Théâtre Gymnase-Dramatique
L'anonyme	vaudeville	2 acts	Jouslin de la Salle, Charles Dupeuty and Ferdinand de Villeneuve	29 May 1826	Théâtre du Vaudeville
Le hussard de Felsheim	vaudeville	3 acts	Charles Dupeuty, Ferdinand de Villeneuve and Amable Villain de Saint-Hilaire	9 March 1827	Théâtre du Vaudeville
L'héritière et l'orpheline	vaudeville	2 acts	Théodore Anne and Henry	12 May 1827	Théâtre du Vaudeville
Perkins Warbeck	vaudeville	3 acts	Emmanuel Théaulon, Nicolas Brazier and Pierre-Frédéric-Adolphe Carmouche	15 May 1827	Théâtre du Vaudeville
Mon ami Pierre	vaudeville	1 act	Armand Dartois	8 September 1827	Théâtre des Nouveautés
Monsieur Botte	vaudeville	3 acts	Charles Dupeuty and Ferdinand de Villeneuve	15 November 1827	Théâtre du Vaudeville
Le Caleb de Walter Scott	vaudeville	1 act	Achille Dartois and Eugène de Planard	12 December 1827	Théâtre du Vaudeville
Le mal du pays, ou La batelière de Brientz	opérette	1 act	Eugène Scribe and Mélésville	28 December 1827	Théâtre Gymnase-Dramatique
Lidda, ou La jeune servante	vaudeville	1 act	Théodore Anne	16 January 1828	Théâtre des Nouveautés
La reine de seize ans	vaudeville	2 acts	Jean-François-Alfred Bayard	30 January 1828	Théâtre Gymnase-Dramatique
Le barbier châtelain, ou La loterie de Francfort	vaudeville	3 acts	Théodore Anne and Emmanuel Théaulon	7 February 1828	Théâtre des Nouveautés
Les comédiens par testament	vaudeville	1 act	Picard and Laffite	14 April 1828	Théâtre des Nouveautés
Les trois cantons, ou La Confédération suisse		3 acts	Ferdinand de Villeneuve and Charles Désiré Dupeuty	16 June 1828	Théâtre du Vaudeville
Valentine, ou La chute des feuilles	vaudeville	2 acts	Amable Villain de Saint-Hilaire and Ferdinand de Villeneuve	2 October 1828	Théâtre des Nouveautés
Le clé		3 acts	Alexandre-Joseph Leroy de Bacre and Hyppolyte	5 November 1828	Théâtre du Vaudeville
Le jeune propriétaire et le vieux fermier	opéra comique	3 acts	Armand d'Artois	6 February 1829	Théâtre des Nouveautés
Pierre et Catherine	opéra comique	1 act	after Henri Vernoy de Saint-Georges	9 February 1829	Opéra-Comique, Salle Feydeau
Isaure, incidental music	drama	3 acts	Benjamin Antier and Théodore Nézel	1 October 1829	Théâtre des Nouveautés
Henri V et ses compagnons	pasticcio	3 acts		27 February 1830	Théâtre des Nouveautés
Danilowa	opéra comique	3 acts	Jean Baptiste Charles Vial and Paul Duport	23 April 1830	Opéra-Comique, Salle Ventadour
Rafaël	pasticcio	3 acts		26 April 1830	Théâtre des Nouveautés
Les trois Catherine	opéra comique	3 acts	Guillaume Edouard Monnais and Paul Duport	18 November 1830	Théâtre des Nouveautés
Trois jours en une heure (in collaboration with Henri Romagnesi)	opéra comique	1 act	Jules Joseph Gabriel and Auguste Michel Benoît Gaudichot Masson	21 August 1830	Opéra-Comique, Salle Ventadour
Joséphine, ou Le retour de Wagram	opéra comique	1 act	Jules Joseph Gabriel and Ferdinand Simon de Laboullaye	2 December 1830	Opéra-Comique, Salle Ventadour
Le morceau d'ensemble	opéra comique	1 act	Frédéric de Courcy and Pierre François Adolphe Carmouche	7 March 1831	Opéra-Comique, Salle Ventadour
Le grand prix, ou Le voyage à frais communs	opéra comique	3 acts	Jules Joseph Gabriel and Auguste Michel Benoît Gaudichot Masson	9 July 1831	Opéra-Comique, Salle Ventadour
Casimir, ou Le premier tête-à-tête	opéra comique	3 acts	Charles Desnoyer	1 December 1831	Théâtre des Nouveautés
His First Campaign	military spectacle	2 acts	James Robinson Planché	1 October 1832	Covent Garden, London
The Dark Diamond	historical melodrama	3 acts		5 November 1832	Covent Garden, London
Le proscrit, ou Le tribunal invisible	drame lyrique	3 acts	Xavier Saintine and Pierre Carmouche	18 September 1833	Opéra-Comique, Salle de la Bourse
Une bonne fortune	opéra comique	1 act	Auguste Fénéol and Edouard Mennechet	23 January 1834	Opéra-Comique, Salle de la Bourse
Le chalet	opéra comique	1 act	Eugène Scribe and Mélésville, after Goethe's Jery und Bäteli	25 September 1834	Opéra-Comique, Salle de la Bourse
La marquise	opéra comique	1 act	Henri Vernoy de Saint-Georges and Adolphe de Leuven	28 February 1835	Opéra-Comique, Salle de la Bourse
Micheline, ou L'heure de l'esprit	opéra comique	1 act	Auguste Michel Benoît Gaudichot Masson, Théodore Ferdinand Vallou de Villeneuve and Amable Villain de Saint-Hilaire	29 June 1835	Opéra-Comique, Salle de la Bourse
Le postillon de Lonjumeau	opéra comique	3 acts (120 minutes)	Adolphe de Leuven and Léon Lévy Brunswick	13 October 1836	Opéra-Comique, Salle de la Bourse
Le fidèle berger	opéra comique	3 acts	Eugène Scribe and Henri Vernoy de Saint-Georges	11 January 1838	Opéra-Comique, Salle de la Bourse
Le brasseur de Preston	opéra comique	3 acts	Adolphe de Leuven and Léon Lévy Brunswick	31 October 1838	Opéra-Comique, Salle de la Bourse
Régine, ou Les deux nuits	opéra comique	2 acts	Eugène Scribe	17 January 1839	Opéra-Comique, Salle de la Bourse
La reine d'un jour	opéra comique	3 acts	Eugène Scribe and Henri Vernoy de Saint-Georges	19 September 1839	Opéra-Comique, Salle de la Bourse
Die Hamadryaden	opéra ballet	2 acts	Théodore Pernot de Colombey	28 April 1840	Berlin Court Opera
La rose de Péronne	opéra comique	3 acts	Adolphe de Leuven and Adolphe d'Ennery	17 December 1840	Opéra-Comique, Salle Favart II
La main de fer, ou Un mariage secret	opéra comique	3 acts	Eugène Scribe and Adolphe de Leuven	26 October 1841	Opéra-Comique, Salle Favart II
Le roi d'Yvetôt	opéra comique	3 acts	Adolphe de Leuven and Léon Lévy Brunswick	13 October 1842	Opéra-Comique, Salle Favart II
Lambert Simnel (completion of a work by Hippolyte Monpou)	opéra comique	3 acts	Eugène Scribe and Mélesville	14 September 1843	Opéra-Comique, Salle Favart II
Cagliostro	opéra comique	3 acts	Eugène Scribe and Henri Vernoy de Saint-Georges	10 February 1844	Opéra-Comique, Salle Favart II
Richard en Palestine	opéra	3 acts	Paul Foucher	7 October 1844	Paris Opera, Salle Le Peletier
La bouquetière	opéra	1 act	Hippolyte Julyen Joseph Lucas	31 May 1847	Paris Opera, Salle Le Peletier
Les premiers pas, ou Les deux génies, ou Les mémoires de la blanchisseuse (together with Daniel Auber, Michele Carafa and Fromental Halévy)	scène-prologue	prologue and 1 act	Alphonse Royer and Gustave Vaëz	15 November 1847	Opéra-National, Cirque Olympique
Le toréador, ou L'accord parfait	opéra comique	2 acts	Thomas Marie François Sauvage	18 May 1849	Opéra-Comique, Salle Favart II
Le fanal	opéra	2 acts	Henri Vernoy de Saint-Georges	24 December 1849	Paris Opera, Salle Le Peletier
Giralda, ou La nouvelle psyché	opéra comique	3 acts (135 minutes)	Eugène Scribe	20 July 1850	Opéra-Comique, Salle Favart II
La poupée de Nuremberg	opéra comique	1 act (60 minutes)	Adolphe de Leuven and Victor Arthur Rousseau de Beauplan	21 February 1852	Opéra-National, Théâtre Historique
Le farfadet	opéra comique	1 act	Eugène de Planard	19 March 1852	Opéra-Comique, Salle Favart II
Si j'étais roi	opéra comique	3 acts	Adolphe d'Ennery and Jules Brésil	4 September 1852	Théâtre Lyrique
La faridondaine (incidental music together with Louis Adolphe de Groot)	drama with songs	5 acts		30 December 1852	Théâtre de la Porte Saint-Martin
Le sourd, ou L'auberge pleine	opéra comique	3 acts	Adolphe de Leuven and Ferdinand Langlé, after Pierre Jean Baptiste Choudard Desforges	2 February 1853	Opéra-Comique, Salle Favart II
Le roi des halles	opéra comique	3 acts	Adolphe de Leuven and Léon Lévy Brunswick	11 April 1853	Théâtre Lyrique
Le bijou perdu	opéra comique	3 acts	Adolphe de Leuven and Philippe Auguste Alfred Pittaud de Forges	6 October 1853	Théâtre Lyrique
Le muletier de Tolède	opéra comique	3 acts	Adolphe Philippe d'Ennery and Clairville (pseudonym of Louis-François Nicolaïe)	16 December 1854	Théâtre Lyrique
À Clichy, épisode de la vie d'un artiste	opéra comique	1 act	Adolphe Philippe d'Ennery and Eugène Grange	24 December 1854	Théâtre Lyrique
Le houzard de Berchini	opéra comique	2 acts	Joseph Bernhard Rosier	17 October 1855	Opéra-Comique, Salle Favart II
Falstaff	opéra comique	1 act	Adolphe de Leuven and Henri Vernoy de Saint-Georges	18 January 1856	Théâtre Lyrique
Mam'zelle Geneviève	opéra comique	2 acts	Arthur de Beauplan and Léon Lévy Brunswick	23 March 1856	Théâtre Lyrique
Les pantins de Violette	opérette	1 act	Léon Battu	29 April 1856	Théâtre des Bouffes Parisiens
