= Herbert Miller =

Herbert Miller may refer to:

- Bert Miller (baseball) (1875–1937), American Major League Baseball pitcher
- Herbert Adolphus Miller (1875–1951), American sociologist
- Herb Miller (born 1997), American football cornerback
