= May Cravath Wharton =

American physician (1873–1959)

- Born: May Hannah Cravath; August 18, 1873; St. Charles, Minnesota, U.S.
- Died: November 19, 1959 (aged 86)
- Occupation: Physician
- Years active: 1898–1957
- Known for: Establishing hospitals in Tennessee
- Notable work: Doctor Woman of the Cumberlands

May Cravath Wharton (1873–1959) was an American physician. She is known for her pioneering medical work in Cumberland County, Tennessee, for providing medical care to the people of the Cumberland Plateau during the 1919 flu pandemic, and for establishing hospitals and clinics in rural Tennessee. She settled in Tennessee in 1917 with her husband and was the resident physician at Pleasant Hill Academy. Born in Minnesota, Wharton attended Carleton College and graduated from the University of North Dakota. She earned her medical degree from the University of Michigan. She wrote the 1953 autobiography Doctor Woman of the Cumberlands.

== Early life and education ==
May Cravath was born on a farm in St. Charles, Minnesota, on August 18, 1873. Her uncle was Erastus Milo Cravath, a pastor and activist who helped to found Fisk University.

From 1890 to 1893 she attended Carleton College in Northfield. She was elected class president in her first year, was a member of the Gamma Delta Society, a women's literary society, and organized women's athletics. She earned her bachelor's degree at the University of North Dakota in 1895 and in 1896 voyaged to Europe with classmates and faculty from Carleton, touring Germany, France, and Switzerland. She was briefly engaged to fellow student William C. Allen. Upon her return to the United States, she taught at the University of North Dakota from 1898 to 1899. She later continued her education at the University of Michigan, earning a medical degree there in 1903.

== Career ==
Following her graduation from the University of Michigan, Cravath moved to Atlanta, Georgia. She established a medical practice there and married Congregational minister Edwin Wharton. They moved to Cleveland, Ohio, in 1907 and founded a settlement house where she served as its resident physician. They moved again to New Hampshire in 1909 where May continued her medical practice. May wrote an article on braided rug making for the magazine The House Beautiful in 1917.

The Whartons moved to Cumberland County, Tennessee, in 1917 where Edwin had secured a position as the principal of Pleasant Hill Academy, a boarding school for disadvantaged youths established by the American Missionary Association. May taught health courses there and was employed as a physician for students and staff members. Aside from Mary T. Martin Sloop, she was the only woman physician to practice medicine in Central Appalachia. During the 1919 flu pandemic she provided medical care for families throughout the Cumberland Plateau, traveling on country roads by buggy, mule, and horse to visit her patients. She was known as "Doctor May" and earned renown for her determination and compassionate care. As the epidemic raged across the state, she bore witness to its devastating effects on rural Tennesseans, who lacked hospital facilities and trained medical personnel. Along with her staff, Wharton established "homemade Chautauquas" and public outreach programs in local schools.

Following Edwin's death in 1920, May continued serving as a community physician in Pleasant Hill, founding a three-room hospital with Alice Adshead and Elizabeth Fletcher. Wharton raised funds to construct the Uplands Sanatorium by 1922. Following the construction of the Memphis to Bristol Highway (now Tennessee State Route 1) in 1927, she established clinics in nearby communities and provided outreach programs for their residents. The construction of a general hospital (later known as Cumberland General) in 1935 and an annex in 1938 was accomplished through fundraising in New England. Wharton worked to establish cooperative health centers in rural communities and staffed monthly clinics in Big Lick, Tennessee.

Cravath later raised funds for the construction of the fifty-bed Cumberland Medical Center in Crossville, which was established in March 1950. Her autobiography, Doctor Woman of the Cumberlands, was published in 1953. In 1957 she also established Pleasant Hill's May Cravath Wharton Nursing Home, which went on to be incorporated as the retirement village Uplands, Inc. That same year, the University of Chattanooga gave her an honorary degree. She also received awards from Carleton College and the Tennessee Medical Association.

Wharton died on November 19, 1959. She was 86.
