= Friederike Grün =

German operatic soprano (1836–1917)

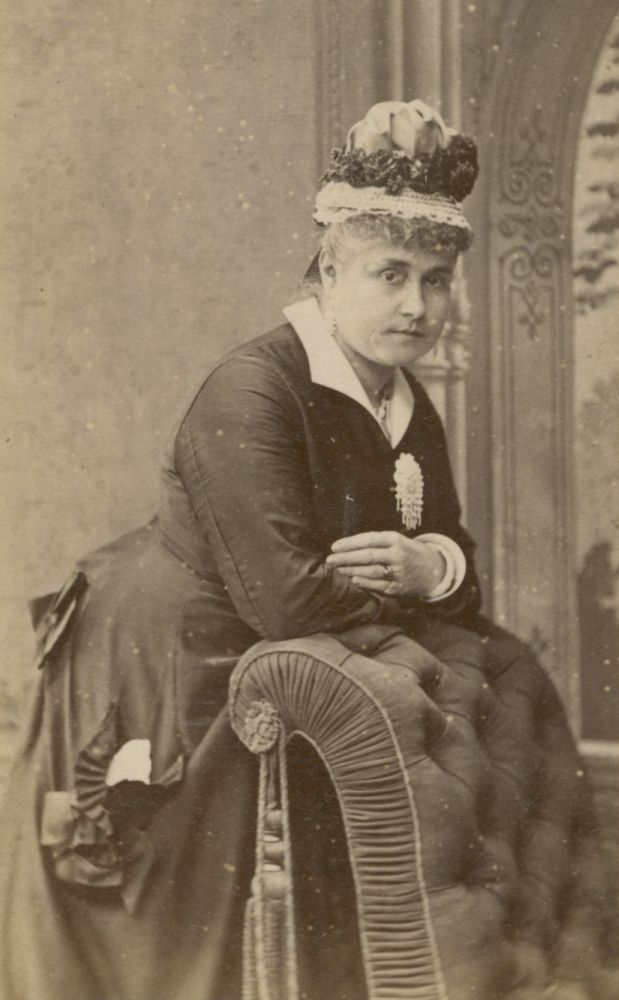

Friederike Grün (14 June 1836 – January 1917) was a German operatic soprano who had an active career during the latter half of the 19th century. Possessing a powerful voice with a wide vocal range, she sang a broad repertoire that encompassed Italian, French, and German opera. High points from her stage repertoire included the title heroine in Vincenzo Bellini's Norma, Agathe in Carl Maria von Weber's Der Freischütz, Leonore in Fidelio, Rachel in Fromental Halévy's La Juive, and Valentine in Giacomo Meyerbeer's Les Huguenots. She is best remembered today for portraying several roles in the first complete presentation of Richard Wagner's The Ring Cycle at the very first Bayreuth Festival in 1876.

== Biography ==
Born in Mannheim, Grün studied singing in her native city with Hofkapellmeister Vincenz Lachner. She began her career as a member of the opera chorus at the Nationaltheater Mannheim in 1857. In the early 1860s, she began appearing as a soloist at the house. In 1862, she was committed to the Oper Frankfurt and from 1863 to 1864 she sang at the Oper der Stadt Köln. She was a member of the opera house in Kassel in 1864–1866 and she was a principal artist at the Berlin State Opera from 1866 to 1869.

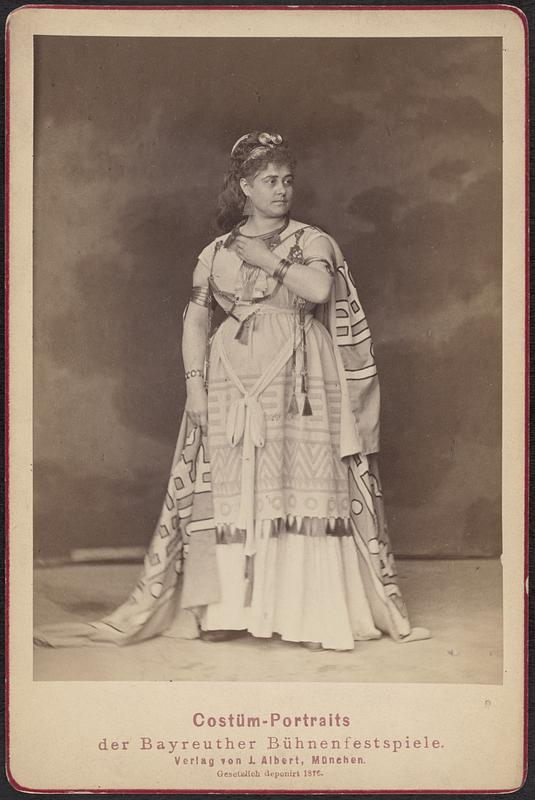
Sadler-Grin "Fricke" 1876, 1876, Cabinet Card Collection, Boston Public Library

After further studies with Francesco Lamperti in Milan, Grün sang at the Staatsoper Stuttgart from 1870 to 1871. In 1872, she gave successful performances at the Vienna State Opera and the Nationaltheater Mannheim. In 1873 she was committed to the Teatro Comunale di Bologna where she portrayed Elisabeth in the Italian premiere of Wagner's Tannhäuser. After further appearances in Frankfurt and Mannheim, Grün was committed to the opera house in Coburg from 1875 to 1877.

Richard Wagner had heard Grün perform in operas in Frankfurt and Mannheim and admired her abilities. He invited her to take part in the inaugural Bayreuth Festival in 1876 in the first presentation of the complete Ring Cycle. She premiered the role of the third Norn in Götterdämmerung on August 17, 1876, and portrayed the role of Fricka in Die Walküre on August 14, 1876. The following year she sang in concerts in London under Wagner's baton.

Grün retired from the stage in 1877 after marrying the Russian baron, pianist and composer Login Sadler. However, she still continued to perform in concerts under the name of Friederike Grün-Sadler, having a particular triumph in Riga in 1888. The couple lived together in Saint Petersburg for many years. Grün died during a trip home to Mannheim in 1917.
