= Nina Bertini-Humphreys =

American actress

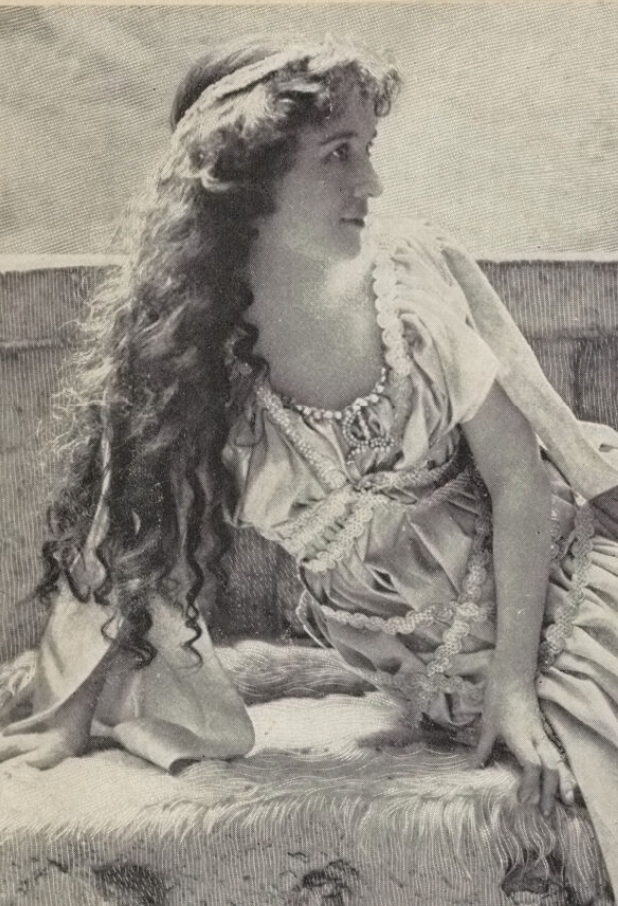
- Nina Bertini-Humphreys
- Born: Ireland
- Other names: Lena Bertini Humphreys, Nina Bertini-Humphrys, Nina Bertini, Nina Bertini-Humphries
- Occupations: Actress, opera singer

Nina Bertini-Humphreys was an Irish-born operatic soprano, active in the United States in the 1890s, and in Britain and Ireland after 1900.

== Early life and education ==
Nina Humphreys (or Humphrys) was born in Ireland. She studied voice in Italy with Francesco Lamperti and Teresa Brambilla, and made her debut there as Amina in La sonnambula. She used the name "Nina Bertini" early in her career on the stage, then added her family name to the stage name.

== Career ==
Bertini-Humphreys was a prima donna operatic soprano. She toured in the United States as a member of Emma Abbott's Company in the 1880s, and of the Marie Tavary Grand English Opera Company, the Metropolitan Grand English Opera Company, and the Hinrichs Grand Opera Company in the 1890s. Her roles included Michaela in Carmen, Gilda in Rigoletto, Marguerite in Faust, the title role in Mignon, and Juliette in Roméo et Juliette. "Miss Humphreys possesses a high soprano voice of much purity, good range and extreme flexibility, her trill being especially remarkable for its brilliancy," wrote an 1893 reviewer.

Bertini endorsed Dr. Greene's Nervura Nerve Tonic in 1888. Bertini-Humphreys performed in England and Ireland after 1900.
