= Pleasant Hill, Tennessee =

- Town
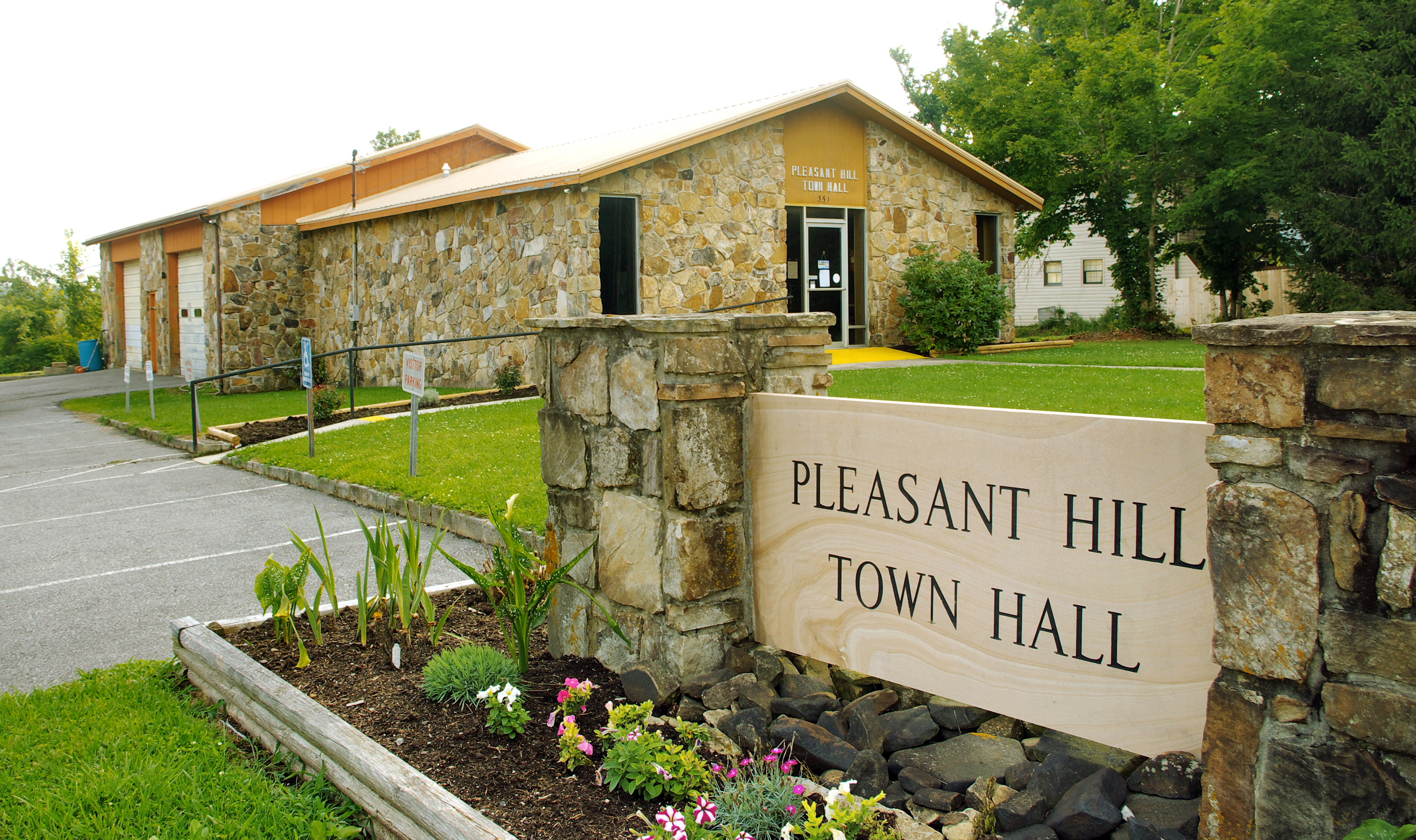
- Pleasant Hill Town Hall

- Location of Pleasant Hill in Cumberland County, Tennessee.
- Coordinates: 35°58′37″N 85°12′1″W
- Country: United States
- State: Tennessee
- County: Cumberland
- Incorporated: 1903

Area
  - Total: 1.64 sq mi (4.25 km^{2})
  - Land: 1.63 sq mi (4.22 km^{2})
  - Water: 0.012 sq mi (0.03 km^{2})
- Elevation: 1,893 ft (577 m)

Population (2020)
  - Total: 540
  - Density: 331.3/sq mi (127.91/km^{2})
- Time zone: UTC-6 (Central (CST))
  - Summer (DST): UTC-5 (CDT)
- ZIP code: 38578
- Area code: 931
- FIPS code: 47-59240
- GNIS feature ID: 1297846

Pleasant Hill is a town in Cumberland County, Tennessee, United States. As of the 2020 census, Pleasant Hill had a population of 540.

== History ==
Pleasant Hill was first settled by European Americans before 1819. In 1884 a teacher from the American Missionary Association (AMA) established the Pleasant Hill Academy to provide broad liberal arts education for rural youth, while also giving vocational training in agriculture and local skills. Supported by the Congregational Church, the school operated until 1947. Its main building, Pioneer Hall, is still standing.

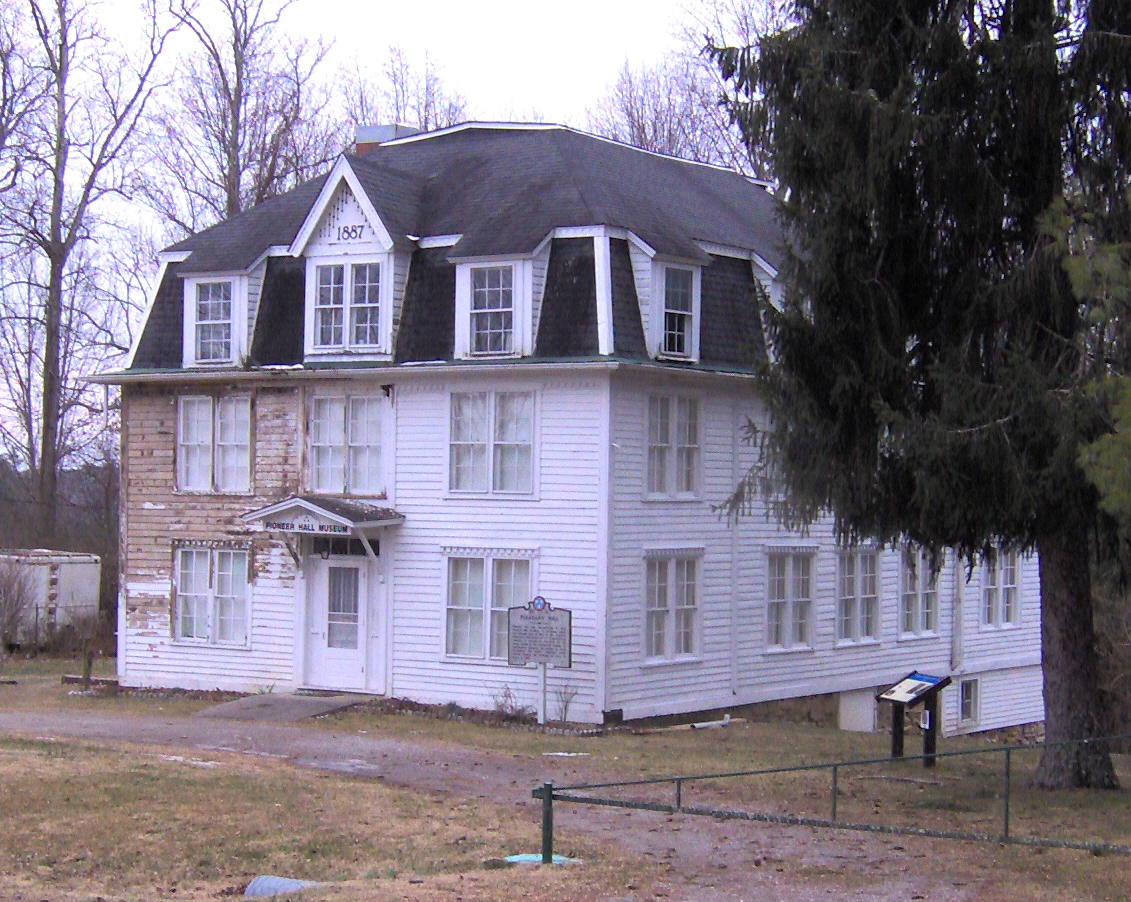
The Pleasant Hill Academy (now Pioneer Hall)

May Cravath Wharton, an early woman physician from Minnesota, established a medical clinic at the academy, where her husband was the director. Wharton also cared for people in the community. They invited her to stay after the death of her husband Edwin.

Wharton created a small hospital and, with successful fundraising in New England through the AMA, she was able to add a sanatorium annex for the care of people with tuberculosis. As no antibiotic was known at the time, rest and good nutrition were the only treatment. The Uplands Sanatorium was adapted as a retirement home when the hospital was relocated to Crossville, the county seat. The hospital is now known as the Cumberland Medical Center.

Camp Crossville, a site just east of Pleasant Hill, was used as a prisoner of war camp during World War II, housing German and Italian officers from November 1942 until the end of the war.

== Geography ==
Pleasant Hill is located at 35°58′37″N 85°12′1″W (35.976915, -85.200229). The town is situated in a hilly area along the western Cumberland Plateau. In the northwestern part of the town, Frey Branch is impounded by two dams, Lake Laura Dam and Lake Alice Dam, to create two small lakes, Upland Lake and Lake Alice, respectively.

U.S. Route 70 passes through the southern portion of Pleasant Hill, connecting the town with Crossville to the east and Sparta to the west.

According to the United States Census Bureau, the town has a total area of 1.6 square miles (4.1 km^{2}), of which 1.5 square miles (3.9 km^{2}) is land and 0.64% is water.

== Demographics ==
Historical population
Census	Pop.	Note	%±
1910	227		—
1920	148		−34.8%
1930	165		11.5%
1940	178		7.9%
1950	152		−14.6%
1960	267		75.7%
1970	293		9.7%
1980	371		26.6%
1990	494		33.2%
2000	544		10.1%
2010	563		3.5%
2020	540		−4.1%

As of the census of 2000, there were 544 people, 273 households, and 143 families residing in the town. The population density was 350.0 inhabitants per square mile (135.1/km^{2}). There were 314 housing units at an average density of 202.0 per square mile (78.0/km^{2}). The racial makeup of the town was 98.53% White, 0.37% African American, 0.55% Native American, 0.18% Asian, and 0.37% from two or more races. Hispanic or Latino of any race were 0.18% of the population.

There were 273 households, out of which 11.0% had children under the age of 18 living with them, 46.2% were married couples living together, 5.5% had a female householder with no husband present, and 47.3% were non-families. 45.8% of all households were made up of individuals, and 40.7% had someone living alone who was 65 years of age or older. The average household size was 1.77 and the average family size was 2.40.

In the town, the population was spread out, with 11.2% under the age of 18, 2.4% from 18 to 24, 11.2% from 25 to 44, 11.4% from 45 to 64, and 63.8% who were 65 years of age or older. The median age was 72 years. For every 100 females, there were 64.8 males. For every 100 females age 18 and over, there were 58.9 males.

The median income for a household in the town is $29,554, and the median income for a family was $37,375. Males had a median income of $23,750 versus $20,250 for females. The per capita income for the town was $21,384. About 7.0% of families and 10.9% of the population were below the poverty line, including 30.0% of those under age 18 and 5.5% of those age 65 or over.

== Notable people ==
- Dora Read Goodale (1866–1952), a poet and teacher from Massachusetts, director of the Uplands Sanatorium in the late 1930s through 1941. Her book of poetry, Mountain Dooryards (1941), incorporated the traditional Appalachian dialect of the area.
- Helen S. Mitchell (1895–1984), died at Uplands Sanatorium.
- Earl Webb, baseball player.
- May Cravath Wharton (1873–1959), an early woman physician from Minnesota, who created the first hospital and sanatorium in the area at Pleasant Hill, and later established Cumberland Medical Center in Crossville.
