= Paul Drennan Cravath =

American lawyer and Atlanticist (1861–1940)

Paul D. Cravath
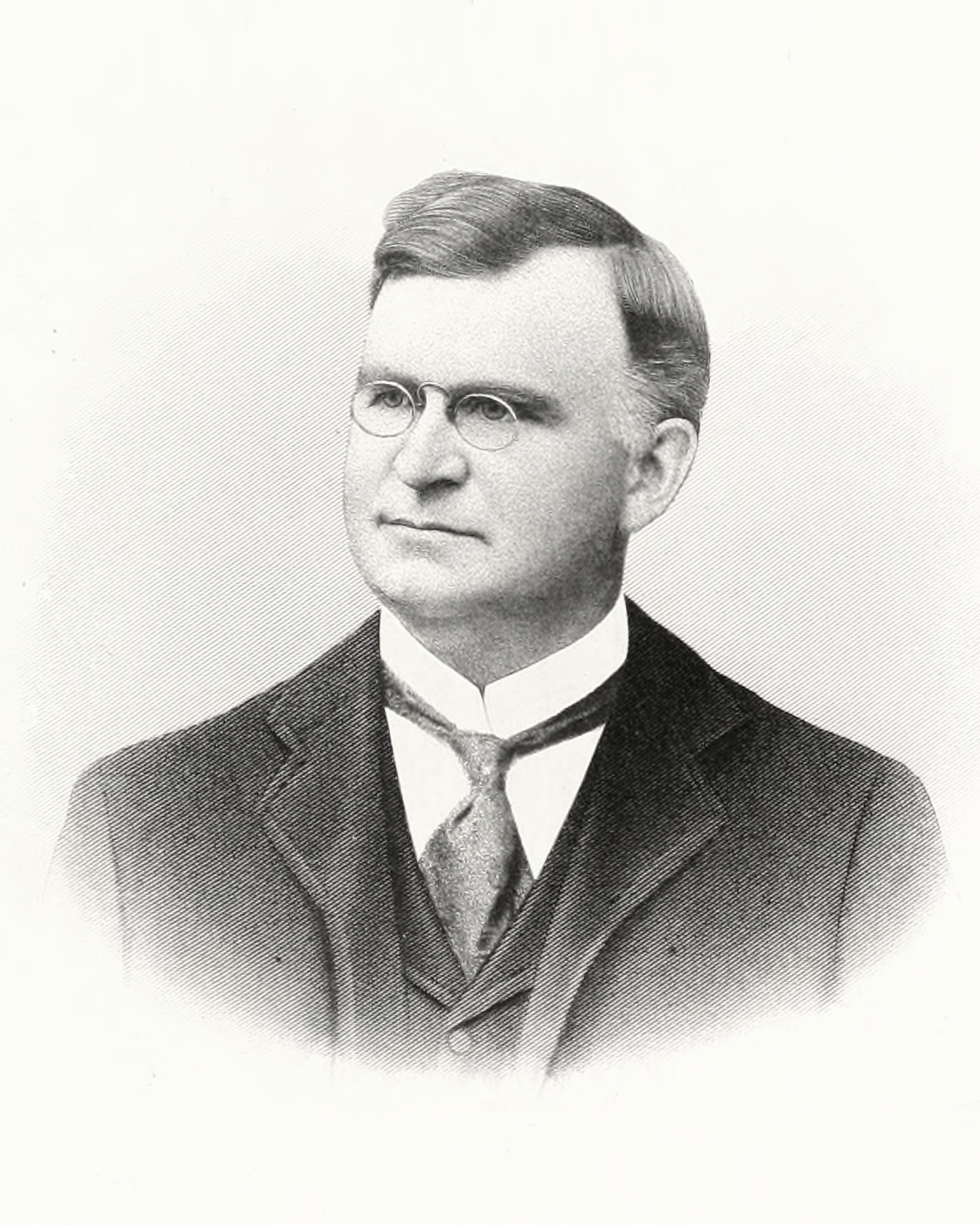
- Born: July 14, 1861; Berlin Heights, Ohio, U.S.
- Died: July 1, 1940 (aged 78); Locust Valley, New York, U.S.
- Resting place: Locust Valley Cemetery, Locust Valley, New York, U.S.
- Education: Oberlin College (AB); Columbia University (LLB)
- Occupation: Lawyer
- Known for: The Cravath System
- Height: 6 ft 4 in (1.93 m)
- Spouse: Agnes Huntington (1892–1940)
- Children: Vera Agnes Huntington Cravath
- Relatives: Rev. Erastus Milo Cravath (father); Georgia Laura White (cousin)

Paul Drennan Cravath (July 14, 1861 – July 1, 1940) was an American corporate lawyer and presiding partner of the New York law firm known today as Cravath, Swaine & Moore. At the firm, he devised and implemented the Cravath System, which has come to define the structure and practice of most large American firms.

Cravath was a leader in the American Atlanticist movement and was a founding member and director of the Council on Foreign Relations.

== Early life and education ==
Cravath was born on July 14, 1861 in Berlin Heights, Ohio. His mother, Ruth Anna Jackson, was a Pennsylvania Quaker, and his father was Erastus Milo Cravath, a descendant of French Huguenots, Congregationalist minister, abolitionist, and co-founder and president of Fisk University. After the American Civil War, the family briefly relocated to Brooklyn, where Paul enrolled at the Brooklyn Polytechnic Institute. When his family visited Europe, he enrolled in boarding school in Geneva and toured Germany with this father.

Cravath graduated from Oberlin College in 1882, where he was considered both "brilliant" and a prankster. Oberlin later awarded him an honorary A.M. degree in 1887.

After graduation, Cravath embarked on the study of law in Minneapolis but was interrupted after three months when he contracted typhoid fever. After recovering, Cravath worked as a salesman for the Globe Oil Company, a subsidiary of Standard Oil, and resumed his law studies in 1884 at Columbia Law School, financed by his wages. At school, he worked as a tutor and vacationed in Minnesota, working on his father's farm and visiting Quaker relatives. Cravath graduated cum laude from Columbia in 1886 and was awarded the school's first Municipal Law prize. While at Columbia, Cravath was a law student with the firm of Martin & Smith.

== Legal career ==
Cravath was admitted to the New York State Bar Association in June 1886, following his graduation. He began his legal career at the firm of Carter, Hornblower & Byrne, a partnership of leading New York lawyer Walter S. Carter and failed Supreme Court nominee William Hornblower. The firm was known for recruiting young talent, including future Secretary of State Charles Evans Hughes and future Attorney General George Wickersham. In 1887, Hornblower and Byrne broke with Carter and asked Cravath to join their new firm; he refused and remained with Carter, with their firm rechristened Carter, Hughes & Cravath. They opened their first office in the New York Life Building on January 1, 1888.

One of Cravath's first clients was George Westinghouse, with whom he became friends, while representing him in connection with disputes against Thomas Edison. Cravath defended Westinghouse against hundreds of claims of patent infringement, primarily by stalling until Edison's patent on the incandescent light bulb expired in 1894. While the patent litigation provided Cravath a steady stream of income into the 1890s which allowed him to leave Carter to start his own firm in 1891, Cravath also gained a large public profile through the so-called "war of the currents," a full-scale commercial dispute for the market for electrical power transmission with billions of dollars at stake. The war pitted Westinghouse's alternating current based transmission system against Edison's direct current system. Cravath defended Westinghouse in court and in the press during suits brought against the firm over unsafe AC power lines, gaining a reputation as the chief spokesman for Westinghouse and the alternating current system. Cravath, working with Charles Evans Hughes, lost most of the court cases.

In 1899, Cravath joined the law firm of Blatchford, Seward & Griswold in 1899, then led by William Dameron Guthrie. He was made a named partner on January 1, 1901 when the firm became Guthrie, Cravath & Henderson.

His book of business included Bethlehem Steel, Baltimore and Ohio Railroad, Kuhn, Loeb & Co., Chemical Bank, E. R. Squibb & Sons, Columbia Gas & Electric, and Studebaker Corp. His name was added to the firm's moniker in 1901.

Cravath was the authoritative head of the firm from 1906 until his death in 1940, and his formal statement of his conceptions of proper management of a law office still controls its operations. Cravath, Swaine & Moore endures as a leading law firm, and celebrated its 200th anniversary in 2019.

=== Cravath System ===
His law firm growth and operating structure remains widely known today as the Cravath System. White Shoe author John Oller credits the Cravath System as the model adopted by virtually all white-shoe law firms in the early 20th century, 50 years before the phrase white shoe came into use. The Cravath System has been partially adopted by most large law firms.

== Foreign policy ==
As a leader of the Atlanticist movement, Cravath was influential in foreign policy. The organization was composed of influential lawyers, bankers, academics, and politicians of the Northeastern United States, who committed to a strand of Anglophile internationalism. For Cravath, the First World War served as an epiphany, building a deep concern with foreign policy that dominated his remaining career. Fiercely Anglophile, he demanded American intervention in the war against Germany. His goal was to build close Anglo-American cooperation that would be the guiding principle of postwar international organization.

He was one of the founding officers of the Council on Foreign Relations in 1921. The founding president of the CFR was John W. Davis, a name partner of the law firm Davis Polk & Wardwell, while Cravath served as the inaugural vice-president.

Cravath was awarded the Distinguished Service Medal by General Pershing, in 1919, for "exceptionally meritorious conduct and services during the war." He was also made a knight of the Legion of Honor by the French government, which also honored Cravath with a "special war cross".

== Personal life ==
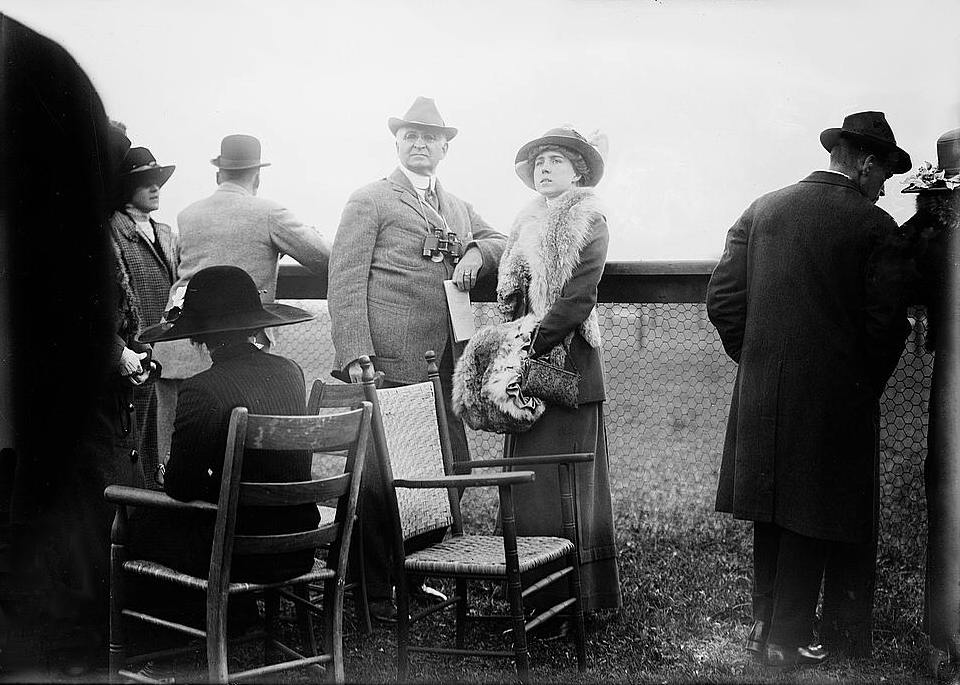
Paul Drennan Cravath with daughter Vera circa 1913

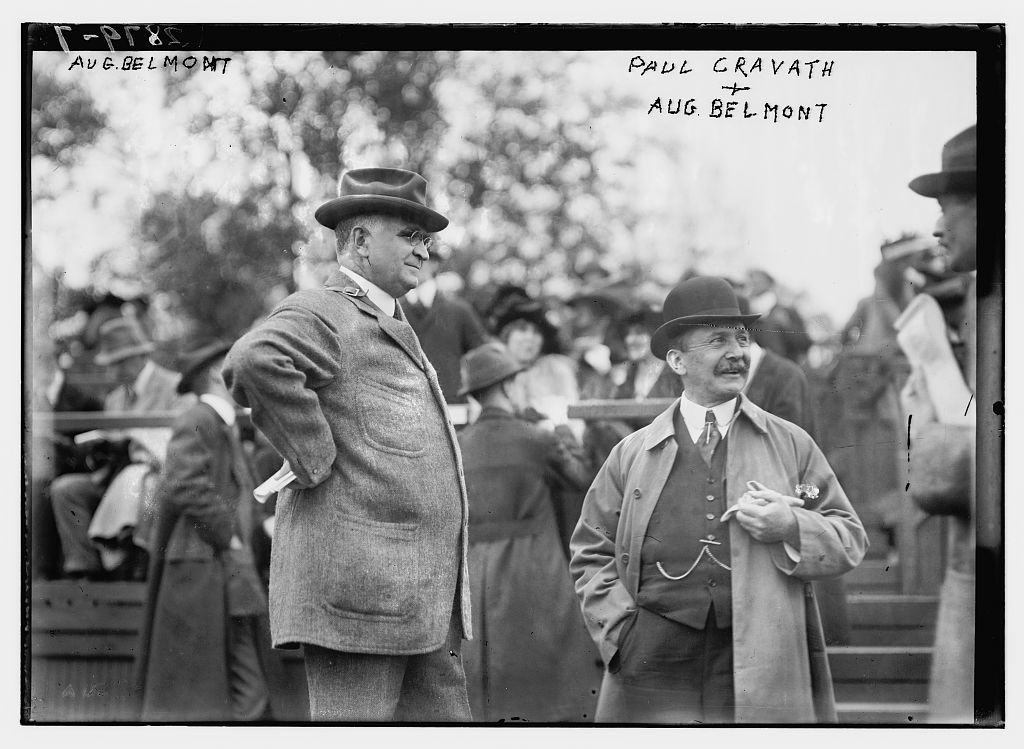
August Belmont Jr. (right) and Paul Drennan Cravath in 1913

In 1892, he married the opera singer Agnes Huntington. Their daughter, Vera Agnes Huntington Cravath (1895–1985), was born on August 28, 1895. The couple legally separated in 1926. Their daughter, then separated from her first husband, moved in with her father until her second marriage the following year.

Vera Cravath married at least twice: to Lt. James Satterthwaite Larkin, about 1917, with whom she had a son, Adrian Cravath Larkin (who died in 2014, aged 94), then to William Francis Gibbs, in 1927, with whom she had two sons. She died in Rockport, Massachusetts, in July 1985.

Cravath served as a member and chairman of the Fisk University board of trustees for over 30 years. Cravath was a director of the New York Symphony Society and the Juilliard School of Music and became chairman of the Metropolitan Opera in 1931 and was subsequently profiled by The New Yorker in its first January 1932 issue.

Cravath died July 1, 1940 and is buried in Locust Valley Cemetery, Locust Valley, New York.

== In popular culture ==
A fictionalized Cravath (name unchanged) is the protagonist in Graham Moore's 2016 historical novel The Last Days of Night, which received generally positive reviews, As of 2016, a cinematic adaptation of the "historical thriller" was in development, starring Eddie Redmayne as Cravath.
