= Sona Aslanova =

Soviet-Azerbaijani opera singer (1924–2011)

- Born: 4 October 1924; Baku, Azerbaijan
- Died: 9 March 2011 (aged 86); Los Angeles, California, U.S.
- Occupation: Opera singer (soprano)

Sona Aslanova (4 October 1924 – 9 March 2011) was a Soviet and Azerbaijani soprano, Meritorious Artist of Azerbaijan Republic known for her historic performances of Azerbaijani, Russian, and an international classical and folk vocal music repertoire.

== Biography ==
Sona Aslanova studied and then taught operatic singing at the Baku Conservatory. Among her professors was Sofia Lisenko-Golskaya, a student of Francesco Lamperti.

She sang in numerous live and recorded broadcasts on the radio and appeared in many films both as a singer and as an actress. Among her most recognized roles are Nigar from Koroglu, Asya from Arshin Mal Alan, and Asli from Asli and Kerem. All three operas were written by Uzeyir Hajibeyov, who also guided her as she began her operatic career.

Aslanova represented Azerbaijan on tours to Soviet republics and to a number of foreign countries. She worked side by side with such prominent Azerbaijani figures in the arts as the singers Bulbul and Rashid Behbudov.

She lived in Los Angeles, United States, from 1994 until her death.

== Honours ==
Awarded the titles of the Meritorious Artist of the Azerbaijan SSR in 1956 and the Order of the Badge of Honour in 1959.

== Filmography ==
- Doğma Xalqıma (Koroglu)(1954), film-opera, as Nigar Video on YouTube
- Görüş (1955) as Firəngiz
- Bizim Küçə (1961)
- Telefonçu Qız (1962), episodic role
- Əmək və Qızılgül (1962)
- Əhməd haradadır (1963), singing voice Video on YouTube
- Arşın Mal Alan (1965), film-operetta, as voice of Asya Video on YouTube
- Bizim Cəbiş Müəllim (1969), as Ana
- O Qızı Tapın (1970)
- Gün Keçdi (1971)
- Ömrün Səhifələri (1974), episodic role
- Bir az da Bahar Bayramı (1979)
- İstintaq (1979)
- Anlamaq İstəyirəm (1980)
- Üzeyir Ömrü (1981)
- Qəmbər Hüseynli (2007)
