= Georgia Laura White =

American economist

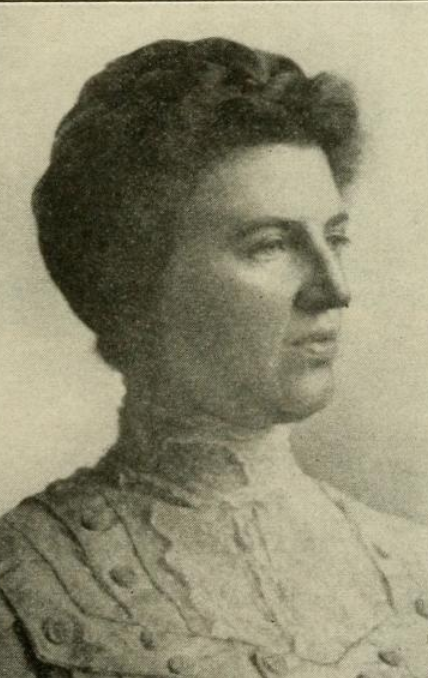
- Georgia Laura White, from a 1915 publication
- Born: April 28, 1872; Nashville, Tennessee, U.S.
- Died: May 15, 1949 (aged 77); Boston, Massachusetts, U.S.
- Occupations: Educator, economist, sociologist, college administrator
- Relatives: Rev. Erastus Milo Cravath (uncle); Paul D. Cravath (cousin)

Georgia Laura White (April 28, 1872 – May 15, 1949) was an American economics professor and college administrator. She was Dean of Women at Olivet College, Cornell University, and Carleton College. She also taught at Michigan State University, Smith College, and Fisk University.

== Early life and education ==
Georgia Laura White was born in Nashville, Tennessee, the daughter of George Leonard White and Laura Amelia Cravath White. Her parents, both from New York abolitionist families, both taught at Fisk University in Nashville. Her father was treasurer and music director at the school, credited with organizing the Fisk Jubilee Singers, around the time of White's birth. Her uncle was Erastus Milo Cravath, president of Fisk; her brother William Cravath White was a prominent attorney.

She trained as a teacher in Fredonia, New York, and graduated from Lake Erie Seminary in Ohio. She completed an undergraduate degree from Cornell University in 1896, pursued further studies in Germany, and earned a Ph.D. in 1901, also from Cornell, with a dissertation titled "The Part Taken by Women in the Charity Work in Prussia."

== Career ==
White taught in high schools in Indiana and Pennsylvania while she was working on her Ph.D. She taught economics and sociology at Smith College from 1903 to 1911. She was Dean of Women at Olivet College in Michigan beginning in 1905. From 1913 to 1918 she was Dean of Home Economics at Michigan Agricultural College. During World War I, she served on the Michigan Women's War Board.

She returned to her alma mater to become Dean of Women at Cornell University from 1918 to 1926, and was Dean of Women at Carleton College in Minnesota from 1926 to 1930.

White was a trustee of Fisk University from 1926 to 1928. She taught English at Fisk University from 1934 to 1936.

== Personal life ==
White lived in Boston with physician and fellow Cornell alumna Juanita P. Johns from 1933 until she died in May 1949, just after her 77th birthday. The Cornell Women's Club of New York established a Georgia Laura White Memorial Fund in her memory.
