= Erastus Milo Cravath =

American activist (1833–1900)

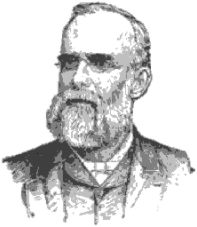
- Born: July 1, 1833; Homer, New York, US
- Died: September 4, 1900 (aged 67); St. Charles, Minnesota, US
- Education: Oberlin College; Grinnell College
- Occupation: Educator
- Spouse: Ruth Anna Jackson (m. 1860)
- Relatives: Paul Drennan Cravath (son); Georgia Laura White (niece); Herbert Adolphus Miller (son-in-law)

Erastus Milo Cravath (July 1, 1833 – September 4, 1900) was a pastor and American Missionary Association (AMA) official who after the American Civil War, helped found Fisk University in Nashville, Tennessee, and numerous other historically black colleges in Georgia and Tennessee for the education of freedmen. He also served as president of Fisk University for more than 20 years.

== Early life, education and family ==
Erastus Milo Cravath was born July 1, 1833, in Homer, New York, to Elizabeth "Betsey" Northway Cravath and Oren Birney Cravath (alternately spelled Orin and Orrin), of French Huguenot ancestry. His father was one of a trio to form an abolition party in Homer, where the family had settled in 1830, at Route 281 and Cold Brook Road, the Cravath dwelling is now noted as the Salisbury-Pratt Homestead, a way station along the Underground Railroad to Canada. Erastus was raised in a household fervently devoted to the abolitionist cause and aiding refugee slaves. It was a time and place of progressive causes. The daughter of his brother, Bishop, Dr. May Hannah Cravath Wharton (1873–1959), left a noted autobiography, Doctor Woman of the Cumberlands, an account of her years as a physician in rural Tennessee.

A decade prior to the Civil War the Cravath family relocated to Oberlin, Ohio. Cravath was a student at the local common school, then Homer Academy, in New York. He subsequently studied at Oberlin College, graduating with a bachelor's, in 1857, then with a Master of Divinity degree in 1860. After devoting much of his adult life to religion and education, in 1886, Cravath received a Doctor of Divinity degree from Grinnell College.

In September 1860 Cravath married Ruth Anna Jackson, who was from a family of Quakers from Pennsylvania and England. The couple had at least three children, Elizabeth "Bessie" Northway (born October 7, 1868); Erastus Milo Cravath (born August 24, 1872); and Paul Drennan Cravath, who became a noted lawyer and a co-founder of the Council on Foreign Relations, which he served as inaugural vice-president, then as a director.

== Career ==
Cravath became a pastor in the Congregational Church of Berlin Heights, Ohio, in what later became part of the United Church of Christ. He was an abolitionist. He entered the Union Army in December 1863, serving until the end of the war, including campaigns in Franklin and Nashville, Tennessee.

By October 1865, Cravath had returned to Nashville. He became a Field Agent of the American Missionary Association (AMA), and worked to establish schools in the South for freedmen. He purchased land for the Fisk School, which he cofounded in 1866 with John Ogden, superintendent of education for the Freedmen's Bureau in Tennessee; and the Reverend Edward Parmelee Smith, also of the AMA. It accepted children and adults both for classes in various subjects, including reading, writing, and math. Within the first six months, the number of students climbed from 200 to 900. Using Fisk as his base, Cravath also started freedmen's schools at Macon, Milledgeville and Atlanta, Georgia; and at various points in Tennessee.

In September 1866, Cravath became District Secretary of the AMA in Cincinnati, Ohio. By 1870, he had been promoted to Field Secretary at the AMA office in New York City.

In 1875 Cravath returned to Fisk University as its president. He spent the next three years abroad touring with the Fisk Jubilee Singers to raise funds for the college. For more than 20 years, he led Fisk University, helping it through its growth and building campaign of the 1880s, and the steady expansion of education initiatives.

Cravath lived in St. Charles, Minnesota, in his last years, where he died on September 4, 1900. Originally buried in St. Charles, his remains were later moved to Nashville National Cemetery.

His niece Georgia Laura White taught English at Fisk from 1934 to 1936, and served on the school's board of trustees.
