= Tecla Vigna =

Italian-American opera singer

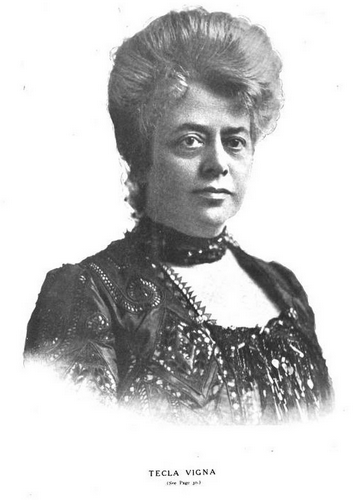
- Tecla Vigna, from a 1907 publication
- Born: Savigliano, Piedmont, Italy
- Died: April 1927; Milan, Italy
- Education: Milan Conservatory
- Occupation(s): Opera singer, educator
- Years active: 1882-1925

Tecla Vigna (died April 1927) was an Italian opera singer and educator based in Cincinnati, Ohio.

== Early life ==
Tecla Vigna was born at Savigliano in northern Italy, and studied music at the Conservatory of Milan, where she earned her diploma in 1879. She trained with voice teacher Francesco Lamperti.

== Career ==
Vigna, a contralto, performed roles in opera in several Italy cities before being recruited by pianist Albino Gorno to the faculty of the Cincinnati Conservatory of Music in 1882. Vigna wrote a text, 90 Daily Vocal Exercises (1894), published while she was teaching at the conservatory. After years of contentious disagreements with the school's administration, she resigned from the college in 1906, and soon she was teaching at her own school. Her vocal method was described as "distinctly Italian, and distinctly modern, and dramatic in the very best sense of the term." Her students gave well-reviewed recitals and were active in the Euterpe Society of Cincinnati.

== Personal life ==
Vigna became an American citizen in 1920. In ill health, she closed her school and retired in 1925, and moved back to Milan, where she died in 1927. In 1932, one of her American students visited her grave in Milan, and left a bouquet of gardenias in tribute.
