= Francesco Lamperti =

Italian voice teacher

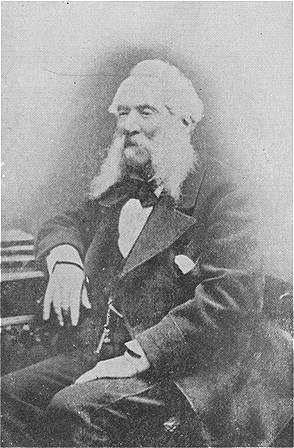
Francesco Lamperti, an Italian music teacher.

Francesco Lamperti (11 March 1811 or 1813 – 1 May 1892) was an Italian singing teacher and the father of the famed singing teacher, Giovanni Battista Lamperti, the author of The Technics of Bel Canto.

== Biography ==
A native of Savona, Lamperti attended the Milan Conservatory where, beginning in 1850, he taught for a quarter of a century. He was the director at the Teatro Filodrammatico in Lodi. In 1875, he left the school and began to teach as a private tutor. Among his pupils were Sophie Cruvelli, Emma Albani, Gottardo Aldighieri, Désirée Artôt, Sona Aslanova, Lillie Berg, David Bispham, Italo Campanini, Virgilio Collini, Samuel Silas Curry, Franz Ferenczy, Friederike Grün, Teresa Stolz, Marie van Zandt, Maria Waldmann, Herbert Witherspoon, Tecla Vigna, Lizzie Graham, and Nina Bertini-Humphreys. See: List of music students by teacher: K to M#Francesco Lamperti. His methods were very similar to older Italian methods, and he wrote a number of treatises on the subject.

== Award ==
Lamperti was created a Commander of the Crown of Italy for his services to music.

== Personal life ==
His son Giovanni Battista Lamperti (1839–1910) was also a well-known voice teacher.

He died in Como, Lombardy on 1 May 1892

== See also ==
- Pasqual Mario Marafioti

== Publications ==
- Guida teorico-pratica-elementare per lo studio del canto. Milan: Ricordi, 1864.
- Studi di bravura per soprano. Translated as Studies in bravura singing for the soprano voice. New York: 1875.
- Esercizi giornalieri per soprano o mezzo-soprano
- L'arte del canto. Milan: Ricordi, 1883.
- Osservazioni e consigli sul trillo
- Solfeggi. Translated as Art of Singing by J. C. Griffith. London: Ricordi, 1877. Revised edition: New York: Edward Schuberth, 1890. (There also may be an edition by G. Schirmer).
