= Herbert Adolphus Miller =

American Sociologist (June 5, 1875 - May 7, 1951)

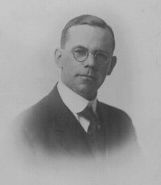
- Born: June 5, 1875; Tuftonboro, New Hampshire
- Died: May 7, 1951 (aged 75); Black Mountain, North Carolina

Academic background
- Education: Dartmouth College; Harvard University

Academic work
- Discipline: Sociology
- Institutions: Fisk University; Olivet College; Oberlin College; Ohio State University
- Notable works: Races, Nations and Classes

Herbert Adolphus Miller (Tuftonboro, New Hampshire, June 5, 1875 - Black Mountain, North Carolina, May 7, 1951) was an American sociologist known for his research on race and immigration. He was dismissed from a Professor position at Ohio State University due to his defense of race mixing and his criticisms of the British empire in India and Japan's empire in Korea. He was a collaborator of sociologists W. I. Thomas and Robert E. Park.

== Early life and education ==
His father was Swedish. He earned an A.B. from Dartmouth College in 1899 and an A.M. from the same institution in 1902. He was an instructor in Latin and Greek at Fisk University from 1899 to 1902. He received his Ph.D. from Harvard University in 1905, completing a dissertation under the supervision of Josiah Royce and William James. He was influenced by pragmatist philosophy.

== Academic career ==
After graduation from Harvard, he taught at Olivet College in Michigan, serving as assistant professor of philosophy and psychology from 1905 to 1907 and as professor from 1907 to 1914. He became professor of sociology at Oberlin College in 1914, before joining Ohio State University in 1924. In 1931, there was a push to fire Miller for critical comments he had made about the British and Japanese empires, as well as his refusal to condemn students in one of his courses for dancing with students of another race during a visit to another school. In 1932, he was dismissed by Ohio State University. Ohio State University was subsequently placed on the American Association of University Professors' list of censured universities. Miller said of his firing, "I am a man who speaks positively and freely on matters, but I am no radical. I have been dropped from the faculty because I have spoken freely."

From 1933 to 1940, he taught sociology at Bryn Mawr. He subsequently taught at Temple University, Beloit College, Pennsylvania State University and Black Mountain College.

He was active in the settlement movement, in particular in Chicago. A critic of eugenics, he argued that differences among races were rooted in prejudice rather than biology. He was a supporter of black civil rights, as well as advocated for the self-determination of Central and Eastern European nations during World War I. In 1912, he argued that growing nationalism among dominated people in Europe would spark a war.

== Personal life ==
Miller married Elizabeth Northway Cravath on August 22, 1903, in West Chester, Pennsylvania. She was the daughter of Erastus Milo Cravath, a pastor and one of the founders of Fisk University.
