= Giovanni Battista Lamperti =

Italian singing teacher

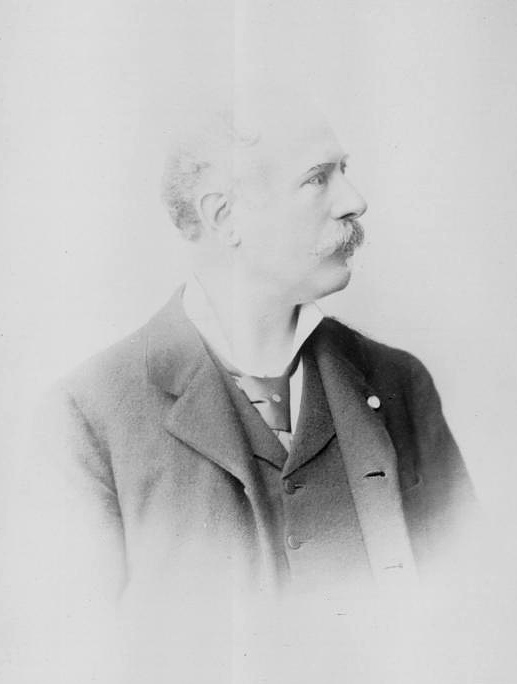
Giovanni Battista Lamperti portrayed by Wilhelm Höffert

Giovanni Battista Lamperti (24 June 1839 – 18 March 1910) was an Italian singing teacher and son of the singing teacher Francesco Lamperti. He is the author of The Technics of Bel Canto (1905) and the source for Vocal Wisdom: Maxims of Giovanni Battista Lamperti (1931).

== Life and career ==
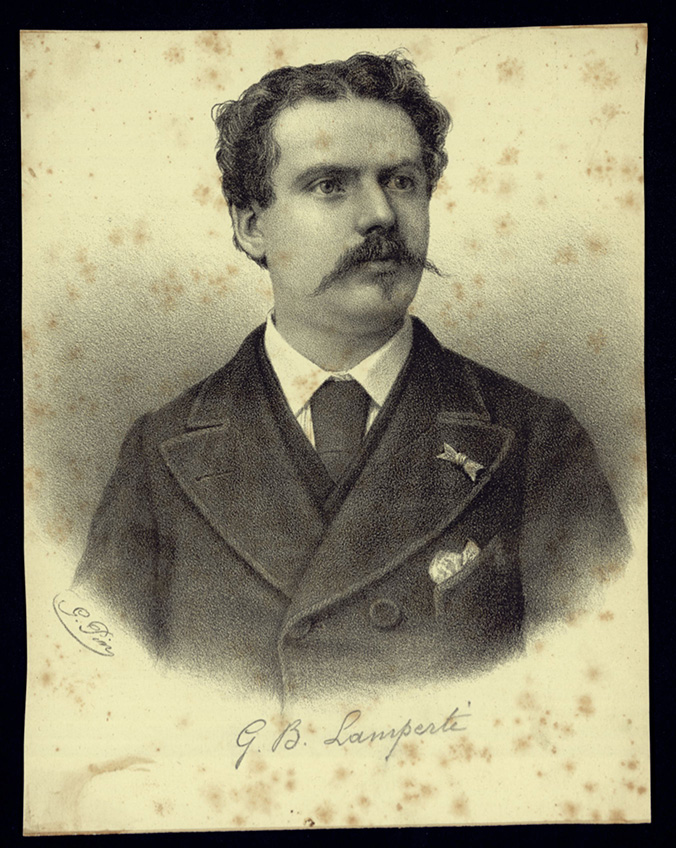
Portrait of Giovanni Battista Lamperti

Giovanni Battista Lamperti was born in 1839 in Milan, Austrian Empire to Italian singing teacher Francesco Lamperti. He was a chorister at the great cathedral and studied voice and piano at the conservatory. A student and later accompanist for his father at the conservatory, Giovanni knew better than anyone else the method his father taught (which he claimed descended from the great castrato-teacher Antonio Bernacchi). Appropriating it for teaching his own students, Giovanni also began teaching voice at the Milan conservatory and then for 20 years in Dresden, followed by Berlin. His preferred teaching arrangement was having three or four students present at each lesson: each would get their turn while the others observed and learned thereby. He was said to be a strict, exacting instructor not given to flattery, but who enthusiastically praised his students upon exceptional achievement. Many of Giovanni's students became international opera stars including Irene Abendroth, David Bispham, Agnes Huntington, Franz Nachbaur, Marcella Sembrich, and Roberto Stagno. See: List of music students by teacher: K to M#Giovanni Battista Lamperti.

There was famously bad blood between the elder and younger Lamperti, eventually resulting in a bitter schism between the studios and followers of Francesco and Giovanni. A pupil of both Lampertis described the hostile situation thus:

Strange as it may seem, father and son never understood each other and were never on good terms. They were both high strung, highly temperamental, and perhaps got on each other’s nerves. At any rate, there was a jealousy between them that was never overcome. The father said that his son was no musician, and the son answered by saying: ‘At my father’s death he had great fame and no money; at my death I will have a reasonable amount of fame and a large income.” When the misunderstanding between the two became unbearable the younger man went into the music profession for himself.

The Technics of Bel Canto is the only book (other than the maxims recalled and published posthumously by his pupil William E. Brown) that Giovanni ever wrote on his method.

He died in Berlin in 1910.

== Publications ==
- Die Technik des Bel Canto. English translation by Theodore Baker, New York: 1905.
- Scuola di Canto. (8 volumes of solfeggi and vocalises)
- William Earl Brown. Vocal Wisdom: Maxims of Giovanni Battista Lamperti. Edited by Lillian Strongin. New York: Taplinger Publishing Co., 1931.

== Sources ==
- Baker's Biographical Dictionary of Musicians, (Nicolas Slonimsky, Ed.) New York: G. Schirmer, 1958
- Text for this article has been excerpted by permission of the author from the introduction to G.B. Lamperti The Technic of Bel Canto, Bel Canto Masters Study Series (Pitch Perfect Publishing, 2009). ISBN 978-0-557-09735-7.
