= Giralda ou La nouvelle psyché =

Opéra comique

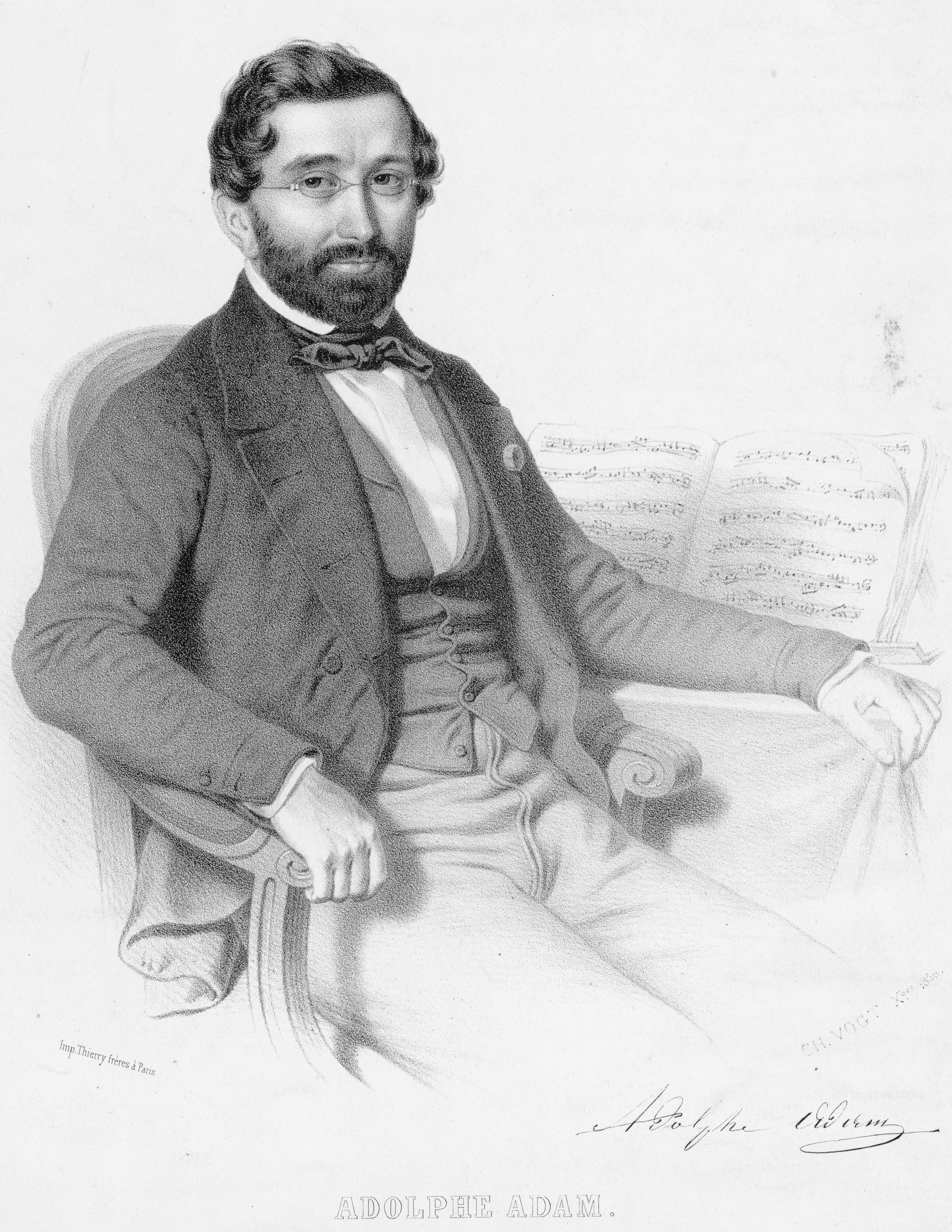
Adolphe Adam, lithograph, 1850

Giralda ou La nouvelle psyché is an opéra comique with music by Adolphe Adam and a text by Eugène Scribe. It had its first performance at the Opéra-Comique theatre, Paris, on 20 July 1850.

== Roles ==
Roles, voice types
Role	Voice type
The Queen of Spain	mezzo-soprano
The Prince of Aragon, her husband	bass
Don Japhet d'Atocha, a lord	bass
Don Manoël, another lord	tenor
Rosine, a lady-in-waiting, wife of Don Japhet	speaking part
Ginès, a miller	tenor
Giralda, his fiancé	soprano
Almedo, a farmer	bass

== Synopsis ==
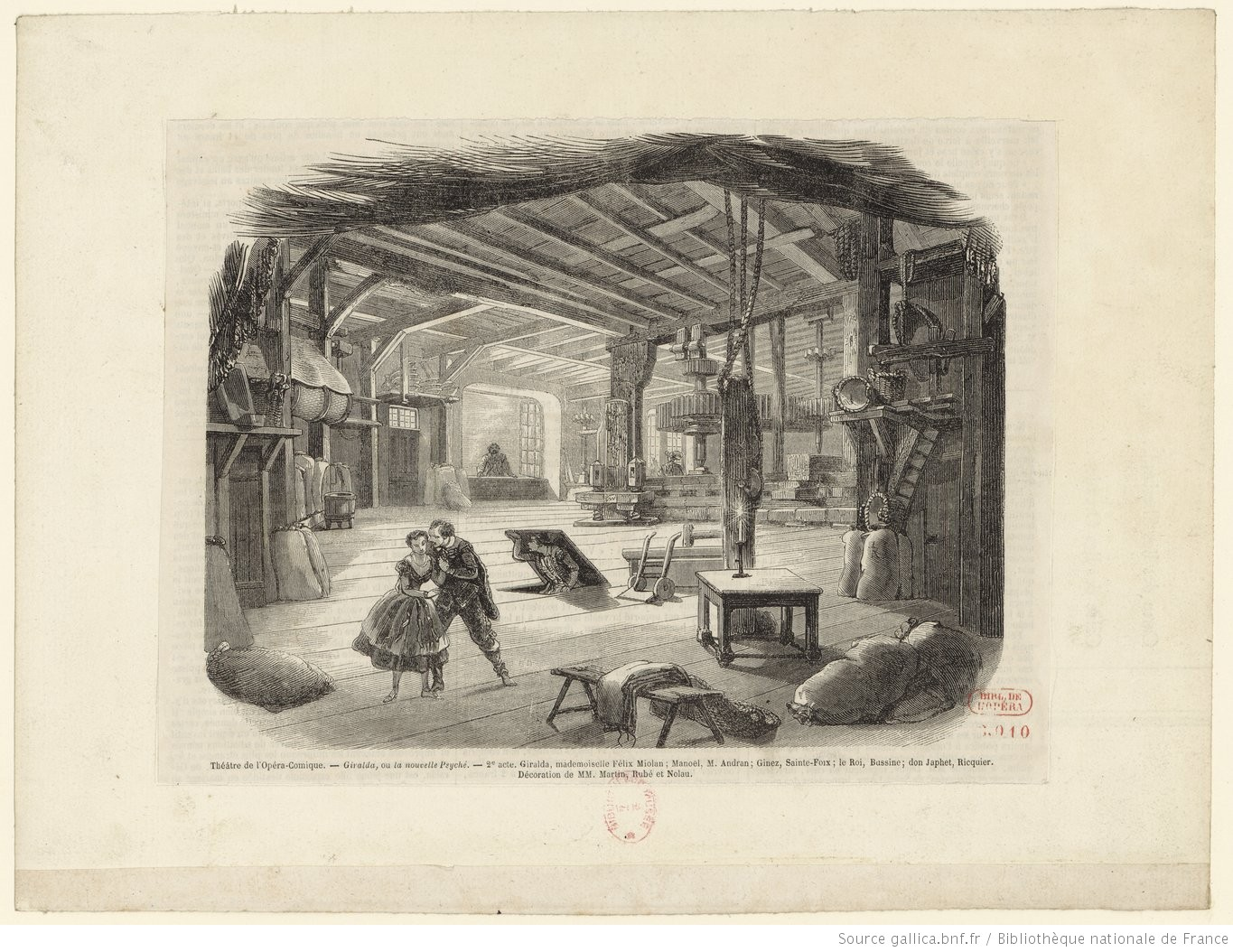
Scene from act 2 of the original production of Giralda ou La nouvelle psyché

The pious Queen of Spain, accompanied by her husband, is on a pilgrimage to Santiago de Compostela. They stop for the night along the way at the cottage of Ginès, a miller, whose wedding day it is. He is to be the bridegroom of Giralda, who however regrets her impending marriage as she has fallen in love with a knight whose name she does not know but who she has seen many times in the vicinity. This is Don Manoël, who bribes Ginès, who really only wants to marry Giralda for her dowry, with twice the sum he is expecting, to take his place at the marriage altar. When he learns that the royal couple has arrived however, Don Manoël, who has committed a political crime and must stay incognito, runs away. While he is gone, Giralda believes herself married in turn to Ginès and an elderly gentleman, Don Japhet. Eventually Don Manoël returns, the Queen pardons his political offence, and he can pronounce himself the happy husband of Giralda.

== Music ==
The overture contains a lively fandango and there is a chorus in the first act accompanied by castanets, giving local Spanish colour. The music throughout the piece is notable for its verve and charm.

== Performance history ==
The title role was performed at the premiere by Marie Caroline Miolan-Carvalho. The work was a great success at its first performance and remained in the repertoire of European theatres for many years. It was presented in English adaptations in London as Giralda, or The Invisible Husband in 1850, in the same year in London as Giralda, or the Miller's Wife and as Giralda, or, Which Is My Husband? also in 1850.
