= Stile rappresentativo =

Italian opera term

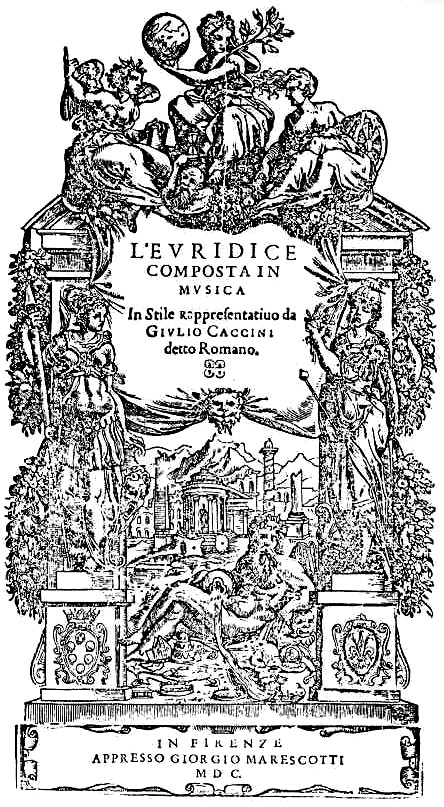
Title page of Eurydice by Giulio Caccini (1602).

Stile rappresentativo (Italian for "representational style") is an Italian opera term. It is a style of singing developed in the early Italian operas of the late 16th century that is more expressive than speech, but not as melodious as song. It is a dramatic recitative style of the early Baroque era in which melodies move freely over a foundation of simple chords.

In The Concise Oxford Dictionary of Music, it is defined as follows:

stile rappresentativo (Italian, "In representational style"). Term used by early Italian composers of opera and oratorio to describe their new device of recitative, in which human speech was represented dramatically as in Peri's Euridice (1600) and Monteverdi's L'Arianna (1608).
