= List of Cravath, Swaine & Moore employees =

This list of notable Cravath, Swaine & Moore employees catalogs alumni and current employees of the New York City-based law firm in different fields.

== Judiciary ==
- Deborah Batts, judge of the United States District Court for the Southern District of New York
- Samuel Blatchford, Associate Justice of the Supreme Court of the United States
- LaShann DeArcy Hall, judge of the United States District Court for the Eastern District of New York
- William O. Douglas, chairman of the Securities and Exchange Commission, Associate Justice of the Supreme Court of the United States
- John T. Elfvin, judge of the United States District Court for the Western District of New York nominated by U.S. President Gerald Ford
- Katherine B. Forrest, judge of the United States District Court for the Southern District of New York
- John Gleeson, judge of the United States District Court for the Southern District of New York
- Robert McC. Marsh, member of the New York State Assembly, Justice of the New York Supreme Court
- James Clark McReynolds, United States Attorney General; Associate Justice of the United States Supreme Court, nominated by President Woodrow Wilson
- Elijah Miller, judge in Auburn, New York; Auburn firm named partner with William H. Seward from 1823
- Rowan D. Wilson, Chief Judge of the State of New York and the New York Court of Appeals

== Government service ==
- Carol Bellamy, Director of the Peace Corps; New York State Senator; President of New York City Council
- Richard M. Blatchford, Minister Resident to the States of the Church in Rome, Italy in the administration of President Abraham Lincoln; early Whig Party member
- Raynal C. Bolling, U.S. Army Colonel in World War I, first high-ranking officer killed in that war
- Richard C. Breeden, activist hedge fund manager and former United States Securities and Exchange Commission Chairman
- Valerie E. Caproni, Federal Bureau of Investigation General Counsel
- Joseph P. Cotton, Jr., 8th Under Secretary of State in Herbert Hoover's administration
- Kenneth W. Dam, Deputy Secretary of Treasury, 2001–2003; Deputy Secretary of State, 1982–1985
- Seymour P. Gilbert, Assistant Secretary of the Treasury in Woodrow Wilson and Warren G. Harding's administrations
- Roswell Gilpatric, Deputy Secretary of Defense, 1961–1964; Chairman, Task Force on Nuclear Proliferation, 1964
- H. Struve Hensel, General Counsel in Departments of Navy and Defense 1941-1955; Assistant Secretary of Defense for International Security Affairs in Eisenhower administration
- David Kappos, former Under Secretary of Commerce for Intellectual Property and Director of the U.S. Patent and Trademark Office
- Roswell Magill, Treasury Department official
- Timothy G. Massad, Chairman of the Commodity Futures Trading Commission; former Assistant Secretary of the Office of Financial Stability
- Carlyle E. Maw, Legal Adviser of the Department of State in Richard Nixon's administration
- John J. McCloy, former Assistant Secretary of War, former president of the World Bank, former adviser to several U.S. presidents
- G. William Miller, Chair of the Federal Reserve 1978-1979; United States Secretary of the Treasury 1979-1981
- Christopher Morgan, U.S. Representative from New York
- Basil O'Connor, head of the March of Dimes
- John Porter, New York State Senator 1843-1846
- Howard C. Petersen, Assistant Secretary of War under President Harry S. Truman; Special Assistant for International Trade Policy under President John F. Kennedy
- Jennifer Rodgers, former United States Attorney for the Southern District of New York and CNN legal analyst
- Richard R. Rogers, Military Governor of Panama Canal Zone under President Theodore Roosevelt
- Frederick A.O. Schwarz, Jr., New York City Corporation Counsel
- William Seward, former U.S. Senator and Governor of New York, and U.S. Secretary of State under Presidents Abraham Lincoln and Andrew Johnson
- Christine A. Varney, former U.S. Assistant Attorney General for the Antitrust Division for the Obama Administration and Federal Trade Commissioner for the Clinton Administration
- Dick Zimmer, former Representative for New Jersey's 12th congressional district and 2008 candidate for U.S. Senate

== Business ==
- Maxwell Evarts, railroad executive for Southern Pacific et al.
- John P. Fishwick, railroad executive for Norfolk & Western
- Walker D. Hines, railroad executive and second Director General of the United States Railroad Administration in Wilson administration
- Robert A. Kindler, vice chairman of Morgan Stanley
- Harvey M. Krueger, CEO of Kuhn, Loeb & Co., vice chairman of Lehman Brothers and Barclays
- Russell C. Leffingwell, Chairman of J.P. Morgan & Co.
- Adebayo Ogunlesi, chairman and Managing Partner of Global Infrastructure Partners
- C. Allen Parker, interim CEO of Wells Fargo
- Adam Silver, NBA commissioner
- Henry G. Walter Jr., former CEO of International Flavors & Fragrances
- Bruce Wasserstein, chairman of Lazard
- Devin Wenig, CEO of eBay
- Julie Sweet, CEO of Accenture

== Legal practice ==
- Thomas D. Barr, litigator who represented IBM in a 13-year antitrust case
- Christine Beshar, partner, senior counsel in the trusts and estates department
- David Boies, litigator who represented Al Gore in Bush v. Gore, founding partner of Boies, Schiller & Flexner
- Bruce Bromley, famous litigator in the 1950s and 1960s
- Evan Chesler, renowned litigator, presiding partner 2007-2013, first chairman of the firm 2013-2021
- Paul D. Cravath, corporate lawyer, Cravath firm name partner, presiding partner 1906-1940, pioneer of the Cravath System
- Lloyd Cutler, founding partner of Wilmer, Cutler & Pickering
- William D. Guthrie, business consolidation and reorganization lawyer, initiated and directed litigation and appeal in Pollock v. Farmers' Loan & Trust Co.
- Robert D. Joffe, antitrust and corporate law expert, key figure behind the AOL-Time Warner merger
- Victor Morawetz, author of the first book on modern law, The Law of Private Corporations (1882)
- Harold Medina, Jr.
- John H. Pickering, founding partner of Wilmer, Cutler & Pickering
- John B. Quinn, founding partner of Quinn Emanuel Urquhart & Sullivan

== Academia ==
- Anita L. Allen, Henry R. Silverman Professor of Law at the University of Pennsylvania Law School, Vice Provost for Faculty and professor of philosophy at the University of Pennsylvania, and member of the Presidential Commission for the Study of Bioethical Issues
- Jack Balkin, professor at Yale Law School
- Royce de Rohan Barondes, professor at University of Missouri School of Law
- Ronald Chen, Dean at Rutgers Law School, former Public Advocate of New Jersey
- Lawrence A. Cunningham, director of the John L. Weinberg Center for Corporate Governance at University of Delaware; professor emeritus at George Washington University Law School; editor
- John C. Coffee, professor at Columbia Law School, securities law expert
- Gary Francione, animal rights theorist and professor at Rutgers Law School
- Eben Moglen, professor at Columbia Law School, founder, Director-Counsel and Chairman of the Software Freedom Law Center
- Charles A. Reich, former Yale Law School professor
- Eugene V. Rostow, Dean of Yale Law School; Under Secretary of State for Political Affairs under President Lyndon B. Johnson

== Publishing and cinema ==
- Thomas Hauser, author
- Carrie Kei Heim, writer, attorney and former child actress
- Gerald Posner, journalist
- James B. Stewart, journalist and author
- George Whipple III, lawyer and society reporter for NY1
