= Up or out =

Promotion system

Up or out, also known as a tenure or partnership system, is the requirement for members of a hierarchical organization to achieve a certain rank within a certain period of time. If they fail to do so, they must leave the organization.

== Examples ==
=== Private sector ===
"Up or out" is practiced throughout the accounting industry in North America, most notably at the Big Four accounting firms, which also practice this policy in their branches in other countries.

Up or out is also practiced in the investment banking industry, where third-year analysts and third-year associates who will not be promoted are asked to leave the bank.

The management consulting industry also practices up or out, where it is commonly regarded as a sign of the industry's "hard-nosed approach to doing business," with Bain & Co and McKinsey & Company being the two consultancies most closely associated with the approach. According to Leslie Perlow, up or out is also employed at Boston Consulting Group.

Among many other law firms, Cravath, Swaine & Moore's so-called "Cravath System" historically expected associate lawyers to achieve partner status within ten years of being hired or to leave the firm.

U.S. entrepreneur Vivek Wadhwa has argued that engineering in Silicon Valley is also "an 'up or out' profession: you either move up the ladder or face unemployment".

=== Military ===
In the U.S. military, the 1980 Defense Officer Personnel Management Act (DOPMA) mandates that officers passed over twice for promotion are required to be discharged or, if eligible, retired from the military. Officers in the former category, normally pay grade O-3 and below, are typically removed from active duty service at the end of the calendar year following their second non-selection for promotion. However, they may be granted a transfer to the Reserve Component at their current rank and remain eligible for promotion in the Reserve Component. Retirement eligible officers in the latter category will typically serve up to a maximum years of commissioned service point based on their final rank, such as 20 years for O-4, 28 years for O-5 and 30 years for O-6. These mandatory retirement dates may be periodically adjusted lower via Selective Early Retirement Boards (SERB) and Temporary Early Retirement Authority (TERA).

DOPMA has been frequently criticized as "arbitrary and bad management" that forces out "many fit, experienced officers... because there were only so many slots into which they could be promoted." Paul V. Kane, a Marine veteran of the Iraq War and a former fellow at Harvard Kennedy School, argued in 2009 that the "archaic 'up or out' military promotion system should be scrapped." High Year of Tenure is a similar system applied to enlisted ranks.

Manning control within the British Army plays a similar role.

=== Diplomacy ===
The United States Foreign Service has used an up-or-out system since 1980. The American Foreign Service Association, the professional organization for foreign service officers, has criticized the system on the grounds that it penalizes otherwise-dedicated officers who do not wish to enter Senior Foreign Service.

=== Academia ===
Tenure-track professors in the United States are usually subject to an up-or-out system. Newly hired professors, most often with the rank of assistant professor, must impress their department with their accomplishments to be awarded tenure, usually but not always combined with promotion to associate professor. Those not awarded tenure within a fixed time may be terminated. This first promotion may be required for tenure and further promotions are neither guaranteed nor necessary.

==== Sports ====
The world of sports is well known to practice up or out significantly.

Minor league baseball rarely has players stay at one level in minor league hierarchy for longer than two years. There are specific and hard limits as to how many players can be on a roster of a minor league team at a each level for multiple seasons. Even though AA and AAA are unlimited, players are still likely to be cut if they don't move to a major league roster within three years. 95% of the minor league players are cut who do not make it to the major leagues, which not a very long time frame in the minors. Minor league baseball is up-or-out to the extreme, which is stressful for the players.

Though other leagues may have developmental leagues, like MLS has MLS next pro, NBA has the G-league, and NHL has the AHL and ECHL, those leagues function more as a reserve team to their main team rather than a farm system, so they are not as much up or out, but the players are let go quicker from those leagues than the main teams.

== Discussion ==
Despite widespread use in certain industries, a 1988 textbook by Michael Jensen noted that the system's effects on productivity have not been studied in depth.

== See also ==
- Vitality curve
- Lifetime employment
- Mandatory retirement
- Peter principle
