= Constellations Publication =

Constellations Magazine
- Space is a network. Constellations is your connection.
- Type: Biweekly Publication
- Publisher: Kratos Space
- Managing editor: Jason Meyers
- Contributing Writers: Madeline Durrett, Leandra Bernstein, Laurence Russell, Warren Ferster, Dan O'Shea
- Founded: 2017
- Country: United States
- Website: https://www.constellationsmag.com

Constellations Magazine is an online publication and podcast produced by Kratos Defense & Security Solutions with episodes and articles focusing on space and satellite industry developments, including policy, technology, and market trends. Some guests featured on Constellations Podcast include Stacy Kubicek, COMSO Director Colonel Tim Trimailo, Former U.S. Air Force General Counsel Hon. Peter Beshar, Heather Pringle, Vint Cerf, U.S. Representative Doug Lamborn, John Gedmark, and Rick Tumlinson.

== Podcast ==
Constellations Podcast
- Genre: Space; Satellites
- Format: Audio
- Country of origin: United States
- Language: English

Cast and voices
- Hosted by: John Gilroy

Production
- Length: 15-30 minutes

Technical specifications
- Audio format: MP3

Publication
- No. of episodes: 244
- Original release: March 2018

Related
- Website: https://www.constellationsmag.com

Constellations Podcast began in 2018 and releases new episodes on a bi-weekly schedule, covering technologies, policies, and companies across the space and satellite sector. The podcast is moderated by John Gilroy, a broadcasting professional with experience working at the Washington Post, Federal News Network, and WAMU 88.5 FM. As of June 2026, the podcast has over 230 episodes and listeners in 150 countries. Constellations Podcast episodes average anywhere between fifteen and thirty minutes in length.

Topics have included changes in the ground segment, 5G, earth observation,, space domain awareness, electromagnetic interference, virtualization, antenna technologies, smallsats, and more.

As of September 2026, the Constellations Podcast was voted the #1 space industry podcast by FeedSpot Podcasts, the #1 satellite industry podcast in the U.S. by Million Podcasts, and a top 5 space industry podcast by Space Crew.

== Notable guests ==
Past guests include:

- The Honorary Peter J. Beshar, former general counsel for the U.S. Department of Air Force and Space Force, was a guest on Constellations Podcast on its 237th episode. The episode, titled "Is the Outer Space Treaty Built for Today’s Space Race?", discusses the intersection of long-standing treaties with nations' deep space ambitions.
- Vint Cerf, Chief Internet Evangelist at Google and one of the “Fathers of the Internet", was a guest on Constellations Podcast on its 56th episode. The episode, titled "Interplanetary Internet, “Cloudlets” and the “Inner Cloud”", discusses interplanetary internet and the impact cloud computing has on data.
- Brigadier General Brook J. Leonard, current Chief of Staff at U.S. Space Command, was a guest on Constellations Podcast and appeared on its 93rd episode. The episode, titled “U.S. Space Command, Innovation, and Defending Space Assets”, talks about the restart up of the U.S. Space Command since its relaunch in 2019 and its growing responsibilities.
- Chris Blackerby, Group COO at Astroscale appeared on its 53rd episode, titled “Space Debris, Mega Constellations and the Orbital Highway". Chris Blackerby talks about the mission Astroscale is taking regarding space debris and regulation/policies in place that would help them with their mission.
