= Pro bono =

Professional work undertaken voluntarily and without payment

Pro bono publico (English: 'for the public good'), usually shortened to pro bono, is a Latin phrase for professional work undertaken voluntarily and without payment. The term traditionally referred to provision of legal services by legal professionals for people who are unable to afford them. More recently, the term is used to describe specialist services provided by any professional free of charge to an individual or community.

== Law ==
Pro bono legal counsel may assist an individual or group on a legal case by filing government applications or petitions. A judge may occasionally determine that the loser should compensate a winning pro bono counsel.

=== Japan ===
In Japan, the number of registered NPO Service Grants, which coordinates team-type pro bono programs, increased tenfold between 2010 and 2020, and supported more than one thousand projects. In addition, the introduction of pro bono is gaining attention as an opportunity to promote citizen participation in corporate social responsibility (CSR) and human resource development in companies, and to solve problems in community development in local governments. The current authorized NPO, Service Grant Japan, was one of the first to take notice of the possibilities of such pro bono, bring that know-how back to Japan, and start offering a pro bono program that matches the country. Since its launch in 2005, the number of people, organizations, and companies engaged in pro bono activities in Japan has steadily increased. At the same time, many organizations coordinating pro bono activities have been established in countries other than Japan. more have joined. As a member of this "Global Pro Bono Network," the certified NPO Service Grant is actively participating in networking and collaboration with various parts of the world. The NPO has a volunteer base with over 7,500 registered professionals (pro bono workers), and successfully participate in more than 180 projects annually.

As in the United States, some bar associations in Japan set mandatory working hours for public interest activities, and are sometimes regarded as pro bono activities. Certified public accountants are also gaining recognition as a result of pioneering efforts by PwC Aarata LLC. Small and medium-sized enterprise management consultants are also active in a wide range of activities, such as traveling to Tohoku with lunch boxes and supporting the reconstruction of local businesses and shopping districts, mainly for Tohoku reconstruction support activities.

=== The Netherlands ===
In the Netherlands, legal services offered without payment are known as pro deo.

=== Philippines ===
In late 1974, former Philippine Senator Jose W. Diokno was released from prison as a political detainee. He set out as a litigation lawyer to devise a means to combat the Marcos dictatorship and introduced the term "developmental legal aid", which involved lawyers providing pro bono legal services but also providing allowances to their clients, who were normally the urban poor, informal settlers, farmers, and victims of Martial law under Ferdinand Marcos. Diokno set up the Free Legal Assistance Group (FLAG), which is the oldest human rights organization in the country. During martial law FLAG has handled most of the human rights cases against the military police and the administration. Eventually the concept of developmental legal aid has grown and fresh lawyers are required to conduct part-time free legal aid for a considerable amount of time, otherwise called the Community Legal Aid Service Rule. Referred to as the "Unified Legal Aid Service" rules starting in 2025, the Supreme Court imposed a 60-hour minimum of pro bono work in a three-year period for Filipino lawyers.

Many developmental legal services are provided by most law firms and NGOs in the Philippines.

=== South Korea ===
South Korean lawyers are required to complete at least 30 hours of pro bono work per year; however, the local bar associations can reduce this requirement to 20 hours per year. Those who have a good reason not to fulfill the requirement may pay to a pro bono fund ₩20,000–30,000 (US$17–26) per hour instead.

=== United Kingdom ===
Since 2003, many UK law firms and law schools have celebrated an annual Pro Bono Week, which encourages solicitors and barristers to offer pro bono services and increases general awareness of pro bono service. LawWorks (the operating name for the Solicitors Pro Bono Group) is a national charity that works with solicitors and law students, encouraging and supporting them in carrying out legal pro bono work. It also acts as a clearing house for pro bono casework. Individuals and community groups may apply to the charity for free legal advice and mediation, where they could not otherwise afford to pay and are not entitled to legal aid. Advocates for International Development, which exclusively brokers international pro bono contributing towards the Sustainable Development Goals, operates from a London base. Many barristers offer pro bono services as a direct response the Legal Aid cuts brought by LASPO 2012, from which they make no profit. The Bar Council has revealed that just under a quarter of the bar offer pro bono; this is 3,486 barristers. Additionally, in 2018, the Bar contributed almost 11,000 hours of pro bono work. In the United Kingdom, a collaboration between local intellectual property organizations called IP Pro Bono offers intellectual property advice and legal support for claimants and defendants in intellectual property disputes.

=== United States ===
Lawyers in the United States are recommended under American Bar Association (ABA) ethical rules to contribute at least 50 hours of pro bono service per year. Some state bar associations, however, may recommend fewer hours. Rule 6.1 of the New York Rules of Professional Conduct strongly encourages lawyers to aspire to provide at least 50 hours of pro bono service each year and quantifies the minimal financial contributions that lawyers should aspire to make to organizations providing legal services to the poor and underserved. In contrast, other states, such as Illinois, do not have recommended hours, yet require annual disclosure of voluntary pro bono hours and contributions made to pro bono organizations. The Chief Judge of New York has also instituted a requirement that applicants who plan to be admitted in 2015 and onward must complete 50 hours of pro bono service in order to qualify. All attorneys who register must report their voluntary pro bono hours or voluntary contributions.

The ABA has conducted four national surveys of pro bono service: one released in August 2005, the second in February 2009, the third in March 2013 and the fourth in April 2018.

The ABA Standing Committee on Pro Bono and Public Service and its project, the Center for Pro Bono, are a national source of information, resources and assistance to support, facilitate, and expand the delivery of pro bono legal help. The ABA Standing Committee also sponsors Pro Bono Week during the week of 23–29 October. The ABA Standing Committee on Legal Assistance for Military Personnel and Section of Litigation jointly sponsor the ABA Military Pro Bono Project, which delivers pro bono legal assistance to enlisted, active-duty military personnel.

In an October 2007 press conference reported in The Wall Street Journal and The New York Times, the law student group Building a Better Legal Profession released its first annual ranking of top law firms by average billable hours, pro bono participation, and demographic diversity. The report found that most large firms fall short of their pro bono targets. The group has sent the information to top law schools around the country, encouraging students to take this data into account when choosing where to work after graduation.

The American Lawyer compiles, from among its 200 top-rated law firms, those that contributed the most pro bono hours of service during the previous calendar year, publishing the list annually. In the United States, the Patent Pro Bono Program is a nationwide network of independently operated regional programs that matches volunteer patent professionals with financially under-resourced inventors and small businesses for the purpose of securing patent protection.

== Architecture ==
Traditionally architects conduct altruistic work individually or as organisations such as Architecture Sans Frontières International or its various national alternatives or partners, assisting peace-making and reconstruction efforts after conflict or disaster, when much of the housing, hospital, educational, transport, civic and other infrastructure has been destroyed or damaged. More recently, pro bono work proper, as services provided to individuals or organisations free of charge directly by architects or architectural firms, is becoming increasingly common. Services are provided either independently or through emerging organisations.

=== United States ===
The American Institute of Architects encourages its members to provide pro bono services as part their contributions to the aspirations of the profession and service to society.

== Other uses ==
=== Media ===
Pro Bono Publico in Dublin was a free DVD magazine dedicated to Irish arts.

=== Corporate ===
Corporate pro bono efforts generally focus on building the capacity of local nonprofits or mentoring local businesses. There are many models that businesses use and tailor to their specific strengths. They may loan employees, provide coaching and mentoring, complete a service marathon, create standardized team projects, engage in open-ended outsourcing, provide sector-wise solutions, perform general contracting, or work on a signature issue.

=== In intellectual property ===
To help make services related to intellectual property (IP) more accessible, a number of organizations have created pro bono initiatives. These organizations offer support from legal professionals at no cost. The services usually cover the professional fees associated with the related services, but no official fees due to a cost to intellectual property offices.

Established in 2015, the Inventor Assistance Program helps inventors navigate the patent system in their own country and a number of other jurisdictions at no cost. Individual inventors and enterprise must be from a participating country and meet certain eligibility criteria. Applicants apply via the IAP Online Platform. Current participating countries include Colombia, Chile, Ecuador, Morocco, Peru, the Philippines, and South Africa. The program is operated by the World Intellectual Property Organization (WIPO). In 2020, the WIPO GREEN reinstated their pro bono legal advice program.

The Inter-American Association of Intellectual Property offers pro bono services related to intellectual property. Services include applications for copyright, patent, and trademarks, academic training, advice on IP related contracts, and IP related disputes.

The International Trademark Association matches eligible clients facing trademark issues with member attorneys who volunteer to provide services free of charge. The program initially accepted applications in the United States and Latin America and later expanded globally.

The European Union Intellectual Property Office (EUIPO) offers free personalized IP support to small businesses for EU based SMEs. The work is not limited to a specific field of IP but covers virtually all IP aspects and services, including help in filing patents, trade marks, design applications, copyright, plant varieties, geographical indications, trade secrets and domain names, as well as licensing, enforcement, franchising, tech transfer of IP rights or any "other IP matters and disputes".

== See also ==
- Charity (practice)
- Legal clinic
- Professional courtesy
- Public Architecture
- Public art
- Taproot Foundation
- Volunteer Centres Ireland
- Weiquan movement
- World Intellectual Property Organization
