= Book of business (law) =

Collection of clients that a lawyer has assembled

Book of business is common parlance in the United States legal services sector and refers to the collection of clients that a lawyer (usually a partner) has assembled throughout their career.

Since most U.S. law firms are organized as limited liability partnerships or professional corporations, each partner is usually responsible for acquiring their own clients in that partner's specific area of specialty. In the competitive legal market, especially in large city markets, partners are evaluated by committees of their fellow partners, with assistance of non-legal market and financial professionals, both in-house and outside the firm, on a yearly basis, which also sets guidelines on billable targets. An equity partner with a stagnant or declining book of business can be "de-equitized" or demoted from the status of a partner who receives a share of the firm's profits to that of a salaried partner or counsel.

Firms seeking to expand often retain outside legal recruiters and specify the minimum book of business they require for a lateral candidate, usually between $1–$3 million in larger legal markets. When a partner resigns from a law firm, American Bar Association and local bar rules require that their clients to be notified, giving them a chance to decide on their own representation. Given the fierce competition among law firms in the past 20 years, anecdotal reports suggest that partners are informing their clients before handing in their resignations to determine how much of their business is portable.

A conflict of interest check is also an important step before a book of business can be considered portable. For example, a partner whose primary clients are insurance policyholders would generally be unable to take most of his book of business to a firm that represents insurers.

== See also ==
- Law
- White shoe firm
