= John B. Quinn =

American lawyer

- Born: 1951 (age 74–75)
- Education: Claremont McKenna College (BA); Harvard University (JD)

John B. Quinn is an American lawyer and one of the founding partners of the law firm known today as Quinn Emanuel Urquhart & Sullivan LLP. In 2011, Quinn was listed as one of America's "Most Influential Lawyers" by the National Law Journal. In a 2016 poll by Bloomberg Big Law Business, readers voted Quinn the country's “Most Famous Practicing Lawyer” at a top U.S. firm.

== Career ==
Quinn attended Claremont McKenna College and Harvard Law School, where he was an editor of the Harvard Law Review and a Knox Fellow. He graduated in 1976 and joined the law firm of Cravath Swaine & Moore in New York, practicing corporate law between 1976 and 1979.

In 1986, he co-founded the law firm today known as Quinn Emanuel Urquhart & Sullivan, a litigation-only law firm headquartered in Los Angeles. Quinn has been general counsel to the Academy of Motion Picture Arts and Sciences, the organization that gives out the Oscars, since 1986.

In 2012, Quinn obtained a dismissal for Mattel with prejudice of a Sherman Act suit brought by a MGA Entertainment Inc.

In 2015, Quinn represented Nestlé USA, Inc. and Nestlé Dreyer’s Ice Cream Company in an antitrust action brought by Clemmy’s involving an alleged conspiracy to exclude competition in a claimed market for ice cream. The Court ruled that Clemmy’s hadn’t presented enough evidence to warrant the case reaching a jury trial.

In 2018, Quinn was lead trial counsel for Japanese entertainment company Tsuburaya Productions Co., Ltd. in a dispute concerning ownership of rights of the “Ultraman” superhero character. The jury would find in favor of Tsuburaya.

Quinn launched his legal podcast "Law, disrupted" in March 2022. Guests have included fellow lawyers, the Mayor of New York Eric Adams, and Johnny Depp trial lawyer Camille Vasquez.

In October 2022, at that year's Saudi-backed Future Investment Initiative Institute conference, Quinn told the New York Times that "the Saudis understand the oil market better than anybody else in the world. I think you have to take them seriously on the merits when they say we sense a declining demand, we need a stable market ... What's the U.S. argument? We asked you to [increase supply] and you didn't do it?"

== Personal life ==
In 2013 Quinn opened Q Sushi in downtown LA with Chef Hiroyuki Naruke of Tokyo. It is an omakase menu of Chef Hiro's interpretation of artisan Edo-style sushi. In 2019, Q received a Michelin Guide star.

Quinn brought the Museum of Broken Relationships to Los Angeles in June 2016.

Quinn has twice completed the Ironman World Championships in Kona, Hawaii.

In July 2024, Quinn was awarded an Honorary Doctor of Laws Degree by Busan University of Foreign Studies in recognition of his outstanding contributions in the field of business litigation and global leadership.
