= High Year of Tenure =

Maximum number of years an enlisted member may serve in the United States Armed Forces

High Year Tenure (HYT) is a term used by the United States Armed Forces to describe the maximum number of years enlisted members may serve at a given rank without achieving promotion, after which they must separate or retire. HYT is applicable to enlisted personnel of all six military branches of the United States.

Officers are not subject to HYT, but are instead limited to statutory service limits by pay grade. See Defense Officer Personnel Management Act for officer information.

In the United States Army, soldiers will finish their enlistment contract if they exceed HYT or RCP (retention control point), unless they are reduced in rank.

== History ==
In January 2010, the Air Force returned HYT limits to pre-2003 levels.

On 1 August 2017, the Navy extended the HYT for active component sailors to 10 years from 8 years for third class petty officers, to 16 years from 14 years for second class petty officers, and to 22 years from 20 years for first class petty officers.

On 14 December 2017, the Navy announced that it will extend the HYT for seamen from its current five to six years on 1 February 2018.

On 1 February 2019, the Air Force increased the HYT for E-4 through E-6.

On 3 October 2022, the Coast Guard suspended HYT for enlisted active duty members until 1 January 2025.

On 22 December 2022, the Navy suspended HYT until 30 September 2024.

In December 2023, the Air Force did not increase HYT generally, but only for those with a HYT date between December 2023 and Sept 2024, which affected less than 2,000 people. Similarly, in July 2024 the USAF increased by two years the HYT for those with a HYT date between October 2024 and January 2025.

== HYT dates ==
Extensions to the HYT date can be obtained for various reasons such as personal hardships or base closures. HYT for the Air Force Reserve is 33 years, while HYT does not apply to the Air National Guard. HYT dates vary by rank/rate, as follows:

| Pay grade | Army | Army (promotable) | Marine Corps (active) | Marine Corps (reserves) | Navy (active) | Navy (reserves) | Air Force (active) Space Force | Coast Guard (active) | Coast Guard (reserve) |
|---|---|---|---|---|---|---|---|---|---|
| E-1 | 5 | N/A | N/A | | 4 | 6 | 8 | N/A | N/A |
| E-2 | 5 | N/A | N/A | | 4 | 6 | 8 | N/A | N/A |
| E-3 | 5 | N/A | N/A | | 6 | 10 | 8 | 10 | 10 |
| E-4 | 8 | 8 | 8 | | 10 | 12 | 10 | 10 | 10 |
| E-5 | 14 | 14 | 12 | | 16 | 20 | 20 | 16 | 22 |
| E-6 | 20 | 20 | 20 | | 22 | 22 | 22 | 20 | 24 |
| E-7 | 24 | 26 | 22 | | 24 | 24 | 24 | 24 | 26 |
| E-8 | 26 (Note: First Sergeant/Master Sergeant (promotable) has a HYT of 30 years.) | 30 | 27 | | 26 | 26 | 26 | 26 | 28 |
| E-9 | 30 (Note: Command sergeants major (CSMs) and sergeants major (SGMs) (at Headquarters, Department of the Army and Army Commands) serving in nominative positions where the CSM/SGM is rated by a general officer, member of the Senior Executive Service, or equivalent, or is serving as CSM at the U.S. Army Sergeants Major Academy or as Executive Officer to the Sergeant Major of the Army are authorized to serve beyond 30 years total active service while serving in the position. The Vice Chief of Staff of the Army must approve exceptions for operational reasons.) | N/A | 30 | | 30 (Note: CMDCM/FORCM (9580) selected for a 1- or 2-star flag/general officer assignment to complete a 3-year tour of duty. CMDCM/FORCM/FLTCM (9580) selected for a 3- or 4-star flag/general officer assignment to complete a 3-year tour of duty. CMDCM/FORCM/FLTCM (9580) selected to serve as the Master Chief Petty Officer of the Navy (MCPON) to complete a 4-year tour of duty. Are authorized to serve beyond 30 years total active service while serving in the position.) | 30 | 30 | 30 | 30 |

== See also ==
- Up or out, a similar private-sector concept
