= Taproot (disambiguation) =

A taproot is a type of plant root.

Taproot may also refer to:

- Taproot (album), a 1990 album by Michael Hedges
- Taproot (band), an American rock band
- Taproot Foundation, an American nonprofit organization
- Taproot Theatre Company, Seattle, Washington, U.S.
- Tap Roots, a 1948 film starring Van Heflin
- Taproot, a 2021 Bitcoin soft fork
