= George Hedges =

American lawyer

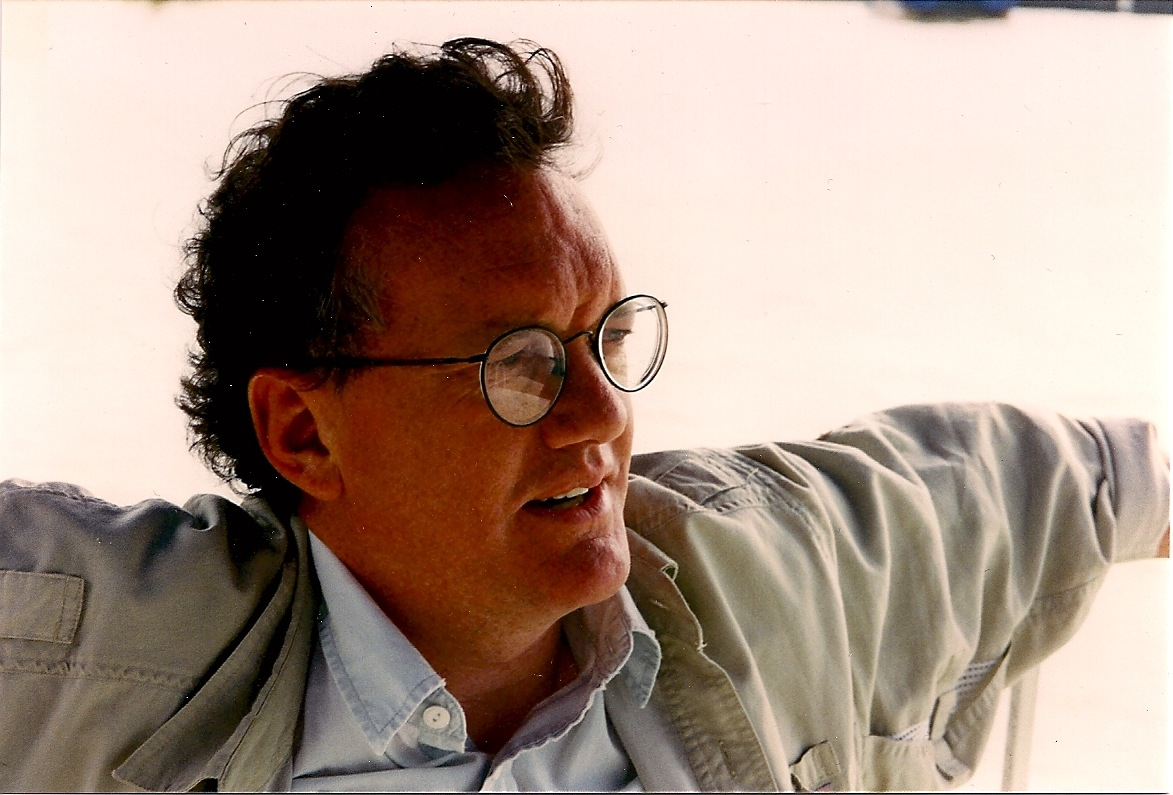
George Hedges in the Mahra region of Oman in 1997.

George Reynolds Hedges (February 26, 1952 – March 10, 2009) was a lawyer with a list of celebrity clients including Mel Gibson and David Lynch who gained attention in the field of archaeology for what at the time was thought to be the discovery of the ancient city of Ubar.

== Early life and education ==
Hedges was born in Philadelphia on February 26, 1952, and attended the University of Pennsylvania there, where he earned bachelor's and master's degrees in the classics. After graduating in 1975, he went to Greece to attend the American School of Classical Studies at Athens, where he did a fellowship.

== Law career ==
Returning to the United States, he attended the University of Southern California Law School where he earned a degree in law in 1978. He clerked for a judge on the United States District Court for the Central District of California following graduation. Thereafter, he joined the firm of Kaplan, Livingston, Goodwin, Berkowitz & Selwin before going off on his own, establishing the firm of Hedges & Caldwell in 1988. Ten years later he was hired to join Quinn Emanuel Urquhart & Oliver as a name partner to increase its Hollywood presence.

An active Hollywood lawyer, Hedges listed one of his favorite cases as one that allowed super-agent Ed Limato, a partner and co-president at International Creative Management, to leave the firm and take clients including Richard Gere, Mel Gibson, Steve Martin and Denzel Washington, despite a non-compete clause that would have prevented him from staying in the business.

He obtained a $6.5-million judgment for director David Lynch against CiBy 2000 for an unreleased film.

Hedges worked for 20 years on a pro bono basis on behalf of Adam Miranda, who had been given the death sentence after being convicted of two murders. Arguing that a confession to one of the murders had been withheld by the prosecution, the California Supreme Court decided in May 2008 to overturn the death sentence and change it to life in prison. An editorial in the Los Angeles Times credited Hedges for his persistence in finding the evidence that another man had confessed to the murder that had been used to justify the death penalty for Miranda, lamenting the fact that "Most of the 669 people on San Quentin's death row aren't nearly as lucky".

Los Angeles named him a "California Super Lawyer" and The Hollywood Reporter selected him for its list of the Top 100 Power Lawyers.

== Search for Ubar ==
After a conversation with filmmaker Nicholas Clapp, Hedges learned about the lost city of Ubar, a major hub in the ancient trade of frankincense over 3,000 years ago. Clapp's training in the classics and knowledge of archaeology led him to become involved in the quest to find a place that many had unsuccessfully searched for before and that many thought didn't exist.

The two worked together with Jet Propulsion Laboratory scientists Ronald Blom and Charles Elachi, who were able to locate NASA photographs that showed traces of trade routes used by caravans in southern Oman. The locations where these routes intersected were identified as locations to be investigated as sites of Ubar.

Together with archaeologist Juris Zarins of Southwest Missouri State University, they traveled to Oman and found a site near a present-day settlement of Shisr in the Rub' al Khali in early 1991. Excavating beneath an ancient fort, they found a limestone cavern into which the fort collapsed after an earthquake. Later in 1996 Hedges, along with Juris Zarins and Ronald Blom, founded The Archeology Fund which contains a large quantity of information about the Dhofar region, Trade Routes, and many other related subjects to their work at the Shisr Site. The website comes complete with reference materials from the members and a wealth of photos taken of the Dhofar Region.

Zarins later concluded that Shisr did not represent a city called Ubar. In a 1996 interview on the subject of Ubar, he said:

There's a lot of confusion about that word. If you look at the classical texts and the Arab historical sources, Ubar refers to a region and a group of people, not to a specific town. People always overlook that. It's very clear on Ptolemy's second century map of the area. It says in big letters "Iobaritae". And in his text that accompanied the maps, he's very clear about that. It was only the late medieval version of One Thousand and One Nights, in the fourteenth or fifteenth century, that romanticised Ubar and turned it into a city, rather than a region or a people."

In a more recent paper he suggested that modern Habarut may be the site of Ubar.

By 2007, following further research and excavation, their findings could be summarised as follows:

- A long period of widespread trade through the area of Shisr was indicated by artefacts from Persia, Rome, and Greece being found on the site. More recent work in Oman and Yemen indicated that this fortress was the easternmost remains of a series of desert caravanserais that supported incense trade.
- As far as the legend of Ubar was concerned, there was no evidence that the city had perished in a sandstorm. Much of the fortress had collapsed into a sinkhole that hosted the well, perhaps undermined by ground water being taken to irrigate the surrounding oasis.
- Rather than being a city, interpretation of the evidence suggested that "Ubar" was more likely to have been a region—the "Land of the Iobaritae" identified by Ptolemy. The decline of the region was probably due to a reduction in the frankincense trade caused by the conversion of the Roman Empire to Christianity, which did not require incense in the same quantities for its rituals. Also, it became difficult to find local labour to collect the resin. Climatic changes led to desiccation of the area, and sea transport became a more reliable way of transporting goods.
- The archaeological importance of the site was highlighted by satellite imagery that revealed a network of trails, some of which passed underneath sand dunes 100 m tall, which converged on Shisr. Image analysis showed no further evidence of major undocumented sites in this desert region, which might be considered as alternate locations for the Ubar of legend.

== Personal life ==
Hedges died at age 57 on March 10, 2009 due to melanoma, at his home in South Pasadena, California. He was survived by his wife, Christy Shonnard Hedges, and his two sons George Shonnard Hedges and Duncan Fox Hedges.
