= Royce de Rohan Barondes =

American legal scholar

- Education: University of Virginia School of Law
- Occupation: Professor Emeritus
- Organization: University of Missouri School of Law
- Website: https://law.missouri.edu/person/royce-de-r-barondes/

Royce de Rohan Barondes is a retired scholar in the field of business law at the University of Missouri School of Law, where he primarily teaches Business Organizations, Contracts and Firearms Law.

== Life and career ==
Barondes received both his Bachelor of Science (SB) and Master of Science (SM) in 1982 from the Massachusetts Institute of Technology, and his J.D. degree from the University of Virginia School of Law in 1985. While an undergraduate at MIT, Barondes cofounded the Rho Alpha chapter of Zeta Psi fraternity.

He practiced law for several years on his own and at Cravath, Swaine & Moore in New York City

Barondes taught law in the business schools of the University of Georgia and Louisiana State University

In 2002 he joined the University of Missouri faculty.

== Publications ==
=== Academic journals ===
- Fiduciary Duties in Distressed Corporations: Second-Generation Issues, 1 JOURNAL OF BUSINESS & TECHNOLOGY LAW 371 (2007).
- Correcting the Empirical Foundations of IPO-Pricing Regulation, 33 FLORIDA STATE UNIVERSITY LAW REVIEW 437 (2005).
- Should Antitrust Education be Mandatory (for Law School Administrators)? (with Thomas A. Lambert), 38 U.C. DAVIS LAW REVIEW 1299 (2005).
- NASD Regulation of IPO Conflicts of Interest - Does Gatekeeping Work?, 79 TULANE LAW REVIEW 859 (2005).
- An Alternative Paradigm for Valuing Breach of Registration Rights and Loss of Liquidity, 39 UNIVERSITY OF RICHMOND LAW REVIEW 627 (2005).
- Examining Compliance with Fiduciary Duties: A Study of Real Estate Agents (with V. Carlos Slawson Jr.), 84 OREGON LAW REVIEW 681 (2005).
- Rejecting the Marie Antoinette Paradigm of Prejudgment Interest, 43 BRANDEIS LAW JOURNAL 1 (2004).

=== Professional journals ===
- Underwriters' Counsel as Gatekeeper or Turnstile: An Empirical Analysis of Law Firm Prestige and Performance in IPOs, with Charles Nyce and Gary C. Sanger, 2 CAPITAL MARKETS LAW JOURNAL 164 (2007).
