= Faiza Saeed =

American attorney

- Born: Walnut Creek, California, U.S.
- Education: University of California, Berkeley (BA); Harvard University (JD)
- Known for: Presiding Partner of Cravath, Swaine & Moore
- Website: www.cravath.com/fsaeed

Faiza J. Saeed is an American attorney. She is the presiding partner of Cravath, Swaine & Moore.

== Early life and education ==
Saeed was born in Walnut Creek, California. She is of Pakistani descent.

Saeed majored in molecular biology and economics at University of California, Berkeley, graduating with highest distinction and Phi Beta Kappa in 1987. She attended Harvard Law School, and graduated magna cum laude in 1991.

== Career ==
Saeed joined the white shoe law firm Cravath, Swaine & Moore in 1991, and became a partner at the firm in 1998. She is known for her close relationships with Jeff Bewkes, Howard Schultz, and Jeffrey Katzenberg, the chief executives of TimeWarner, Starbucks, and DreamWorks, respectively. Other clients include Morgan Stanley and Hasbro, Inc.

Following her election to presiding partner at Cravath in July 2016, Saeed received considerable media attention. According to The Wall Street Journal, Saeed is the first woman to lead Cravath, which traces its origins to 1819. She is also one of few women to lead a New York law firm. The Financial Times noted her election as "a symbolically significant moment for a dealmaking industry that is still vastly dominated by white men in suits".

Saeed cultivated a reputation as an empathetic advisor, known for a calm, under-stated style; she has orchestrated multi-billion-dollar deals for clients in media, pharmaceuticals, entertainment, and other fields.

== Boards and affiliations ==
Saeed is a trustee of NewYork-Presbyterian Hospital, and of The Paley Center for Media. She is a board member of Partnership for New York City, and a member of the Council on Foreign Relations.

== Honors ==
Saeed was a "Young Global Leader" at the World Economic Forum in Davos in 2006, and included on its "Wall Street’s 100 Masters of the New Universe" list by the New York Times. In 2019, she was named to Crain's New York Business biennial list of the "Most Powerful Women in New York", and the Asia Society recognized her as a "Game Changer", describing Saeed as "a trusted advisor to chief executives and entrepreneurs, and a leading dealmaker across many industries". Saeed received the American Jewish Committee's Judge Learned Hand Award in 2019. The Hollywood Reporter named Saeed to its "Power Lawyers 2020" and "Hollywood's Top Dealmakers of 2020" lists. She received the Judge Simon H. Rifkind Award from The Jewish Theological Seminary of America in 2021. In 2024, she received the Paley Center for Media's Paley Honors Award, as "a principal architect of the modern media landscape".
