= Manning control =

British Army termination policy

Manning control is a policy in the British Army that allows the force to terminate the service of soldiers after 3, 6, 9, 12 or 15 years' service to maintain the balance of age and capability within the force and ensure that there are opportunities for talented individuals to move through the ranks. The policy has been criticised as a way of dismissing committed and loyal soldiers and to avoid providing suitable pensions or redundancy compensation. During the seven-year period it is alleged the Manning Control policy was abused, it is estimated as having saved 6.3 billion pounds in service pension commitments.

== Motivation ==
Manning control was created to allow the army to maintain a balance of experience and to ensure that there were opportunities for talented soldiers to progress through the ranks. It was originally designed to review soldiers' careers at six, nine and 12-year points of service and to free up the promotional logjam in the junior NCO ranks of corporal and lance-corporal. If a soldier was not progressing through the ranks they may be redeployed or dismissed. The regulations are defined in para 9.413 of Queen's Regulations 1975. A similar system is used by the United States Armed Forces, which insists that certain ranks be held for no longer than a set amount of time, with lack of promotion in that time being used as grounds for dismissal.

== History ==
Manning Control was first introduced in the late 1950s to reduce the numbers of soldiers in the British Army after conscription ended. It was suspended in the 1970s and 80s. The policy resumed in 1993 after 34,600 redundancies in the UK Armed Forces with almost half from the army taking redundancy after the Cold War. The Territorial Army (TA) was also cut from 57,000 to around 40,000 people.

The redundancies caused under-manning in various trades and a huge black hole in the Ministry of Defence (MOD) budget as many more soldiers opted for the attractive redundancy package than expected. Weeks later, soldiers who had taken the redundancy package were back in uniform at the request of the MOD for a short period, to ameliorate what was hoped to be a temporary manpower shortage. The contract used was an S/Type contract used primarily for the TA soldier and called a Type S contract if a TA member wished to serve with a regular battalion.

Soldiers who joined the Army in the 90s signed on for 22 years, with an option to leave after three, six or nine years. At the end of their 22 years, they receive an immediate pension for life.

Lists of soldiers subject to Manning Control were being sent by APC Glasgow, the Army administrative wing, even when there was a well reported shortfall in Army manning. Soon more and more soldiers were falling victim to the "Brown envelope" as it was known. Soldiers who are regarded as excellent in their reports were pressured into leaving the Army "voluntarily" or signing a new "S-type engagement" contract and giving up the prospect of an immediate pension when they left.

Forms such as the AFB130A application against the soldiers discharge were negated from the process, preventing the soldier from making a representation against the Manning Control order until it was too late.

The absence of the form also hid the real number of soldiers subject to Manning Control from the Defence Analytical Services Agency as most soldiers would "jump ship" rather than it be known on their record of service that they were forced out. This was later admitted by Geoff Hoon the secretary of state for defence in a letter to Paul Keetch the Liberal Democrat defence spokesman.

=== Controversy ===
A soldier from the Parachute Regiment, Corporal Paul Biddiss, was told in November 1999 by his Company Commander, Major Mike Nott that he would be manning controlled. Its alleged in court papers the soldiers application to see his Commanding Officer Lt Col Kennett to seek redress was blocked. He refused to sign off his old contract as it was alleged he should never have been subject to the policy; it is believed he was the first soldier to refuse. He won his fight against the system and is still a serving soldier. This was the turning point for Manning Control due mainly to the treatment Cpl Biddiss and his family were alleged to have endured during the Manning Control process. This generated media attention to what was until then an unknown system of mass discharging of soldiers, allegedly for their pension rights.

On 29 Apr 2002, Michael Smith, defence correspondent of The Daily Telegraph, Tom Newton Dunn, defence editor of the Daily Mirror and Andrew Gilligan from the Radio 4 Today programme, publicized the case of Cpl Paul Biddiss, in a combined effort and with the campaigning solicitor Thomas Reah and Private Investigator, Dave Howels. Howels later went on to help establish the British Armed Forces Federation under the leadership of Douglas Young.

Tom Reah campaigned for the change in pension rights for the partner of a SAS soldier who was killed rescuing British hostages in Sierra Leone. The Liberal Democrats defence spokesman Paul Keetch called for the immediate suspension of the scheme, known as "manning control" and an inquiry into its administration. Mr Breed from the Liberal Democrats defence team stated that

There is a danger of seeing such measures in purely fiscal terms—as an extra figure in the MOD budget—but the effect that such measures can have on members of the armed forces and their loved ones cannot be underestimated. To that end, I would like to raise a subject on which I have exchanged many letters and parliamentary questions with the Minster [sic] with responsibility for the armed forces: manning control points. In principle, a mechanism that prevents soldiers who are struggling from blocking promotion paths is reasonable, but in practice we have seen considerable evidence from former soldiers that the system has been misused, or at worst abused. Such a system should never be used simply to try to move decent, hard-working soldiers on to short-term contracts, under which they enjoy fewer rights and their service can be terminated without the pension entitlement that they richly deserve.

During the next few months more and more stories were being reported about alleged abuse of the system by former soldiers. During Parliamentary questions the Ministry of Defence admitted that hundreds of medically unfit soldiers were thrown out of the Army rather than being given medical discharges, in an apparent contravention of its own rules. The Army admitted it had used Manning Control to throw out soldiers who should have been Medically Discharged. The admission came in a written answer from Adam Ingram, the Armed Forces minister, who said 259 soldiers, who were medically downgraded to a point where they could no longer carry out their roles, had been sacked since 1997.

A number of the medically unfit soldiers were sacked under the "manning control" system that allowed the Army to discharge soldiers it did not want. Medically Discharged. It was used to discharge hundreds of soldiers who had done nothing wrong, in an apparent attempt to ensure they did not qualify for an immediate pension. An unnamed serving soldier told Channel 4 News he believed the Army was forcing servicemen to “jump before they are pushed” in a bid to save money".

The Army was facing a class action by hundreds of former soldiers alleging that they were sacked or forced out under the manning control system to stop them attaining the length of service that would have entitled them to an immediate pension. Soon after, Manning Control was suspended but it is expected to be reintroduced, raising questions as to whether soldiers wounded in Afghanistan will find themselves "brown-enveloped".

In December 2007, BAFF discovered after an investigation by Dave Howels a plan to sack Gurkhas early to reduce their pension rights using Manning Control. The Ministry of Defence (MoD) is facing legal action over plans to cut the pensions of Gurkhas by sacking them three years before they are due to leave the army. The move, which means the MoD will avoid having to pay an ordinary Gurkha soldier more than £200,000, is to be challenged in the courts by the British Armed Forces Federation (BAFF).

When Bill Rammell, the Secretary of State for Defence, was asked in parliament how many soldiers subject to manning control are (a) awaiting discharge and (b) have been discharged since 2007, he responded "No soldiers have been discharged under Manning Control Points since 2002, and no soldiers are awaiting discharge".

Prime Minister David Cameron, answering MPs' questions following his Statement on the SDSR, gave the assurance that the resulting reductions in the numbers of service personnel would not involve the use of manning control instead of "proper redundancy payments". Against a historic background of injustice to some individuals during earlier times of financial stringency and forces downsizing, BAFF welcomed this important confirmation by the PM and looked to the MoD and service authorities to ensure that it is not overlooked in practice.

== See also ==
- King's Regulations
- Up or out
