= C. Allen Parker =

American business executive and attorney (born 1955)

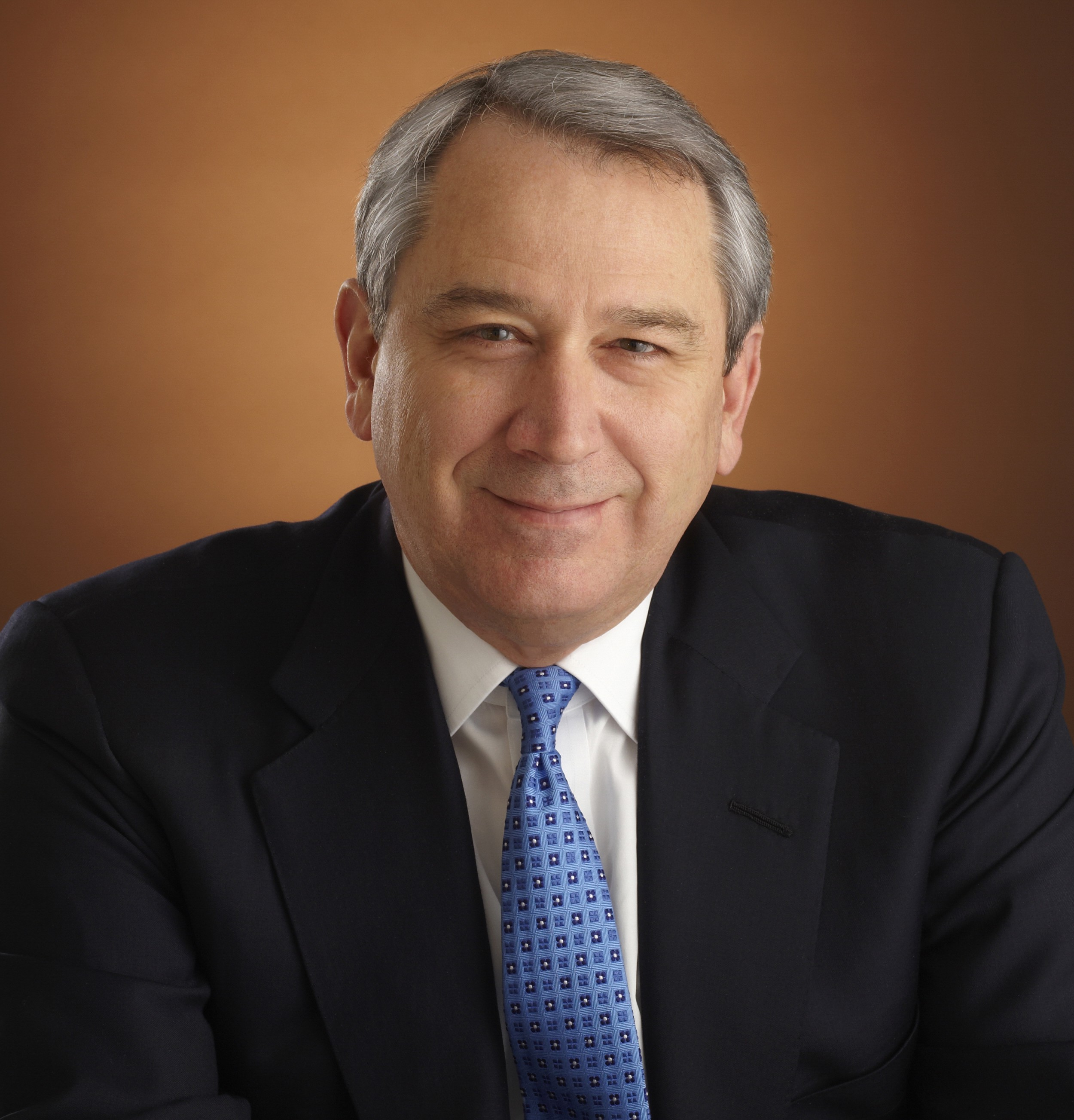
- Born: February 17, 1955 (age 71); Jacksonville, Florida
- Education: Duke University (BA); University of Chicago (MA); Columbia University (JD)
- Occupation: Banker
- Known for: Former Presiding Partner, Cravath, Swaine & Moore LLP
- Title: Interim CEO and president, Wells Fargo
- Predecessor: Timothy J. Sloan
- Successor: Charles Scharf

C. Allen Parker (born February 17, 1955) is an American business executive and attorney. He was the senior executive vice president and general counsel of Wells Fargo, and also served as its interim CEO and president. Prior to joining Wells Fargo, Parker was a partner at New York law firm Cravath, Swaine & Moore LLP, and served as its fifteenth presiding partner.

== Early life and education ==
Parker was born in Jacksonville, Florida and spent his childhood years in Georgia. He is the son of Charles A. Parker, a college professor, and Sara Parker (née Hobby), an elementary school teacher. Parker attended Duke University, where he received a B.A., magna cum laude, in political science and comparative area studies, in 1977. In 1980, he received an M.A. in political science from the University of Chicago, where his studies focused on South Asia and the Middle East. In 1983, Parker received a J.D., magna cum laude, from Columbia University School of Law, where he served as a Notes and Comments editor of the Columbia Law Review.

== Career ==
From 1983 to 1984, Parker served as a law clerk to the Honorable Amalya L. Kearse of the United States Court of Appeals for the Second Circuit. Upon the completion of that clerkship, he became an associate in the corporate department of Cravath, Swaine & Moore.

=== Cravath, Swaine & Moore ===
Parker became a partner in the corporate department at Cravath in June 1990, and focused his practice on commercial bank financing, as well as a broad range of other matters in the areas of general corporate practice, securities offerings, mergers and acquisitions, and derivative transactions. His practice experience included acquisition finance and other commercial banking transactions throughout the world, and Parker was regularly recognized as one of the country's preeminent practitioners in banking and finance. During his time as a Cravath partner, Parker worked closely with JPMorgan vice chairman James B. Lee, who later credited Parker for his help as JPMorgan built its investment banking business.

Parker served from January 2001 to December 2004 as the managing partner of Cravath’s corporate department. Then, from January 2007 to December 2013, he served as Cravath’s deputy presiding partner and, for two years during that period, also served as the head of Cravath’s corporate department.

From January 2013 through December 2016, Parker served as Cravath’s fifteenth presiding partner.

=== Wells Fargo ===
In March 2017, after what was described as a “successful turn as Cravath’s Presiding Partner” during which he made “principles and culture a focus of his tenure,” Parker left Cravath to become the General Counsel of Wells Fargo, then stating that he intended "to make the legal department of Wells Fargo a beacon for other departments in ethics.”

In March 2019, upon the retirement of Wells Fargo CEO and president, Timothy J. Sloan, Parker was elected by the board of directors to serve as the chief executive officer and president, on an interim basis, while the board conducted a search for a permanent CEO. He was also elected a member of the board of directors, then was reelected by shareholder vote, in April 2019. Parker returned to the General Counsel role in October 2019, and left Wells Fargo in March 2020.

During his years as a Cravath partner, Parker has been described as having “the skills of a ‘master negotiator’” and as possessing “keen strategic and business abilities.

== Personal life ==
Parker has been married since 1996. He and his wife have four children.
