= Building a Better Legal Profession =

2007 organization founded by students at Stanford Law School

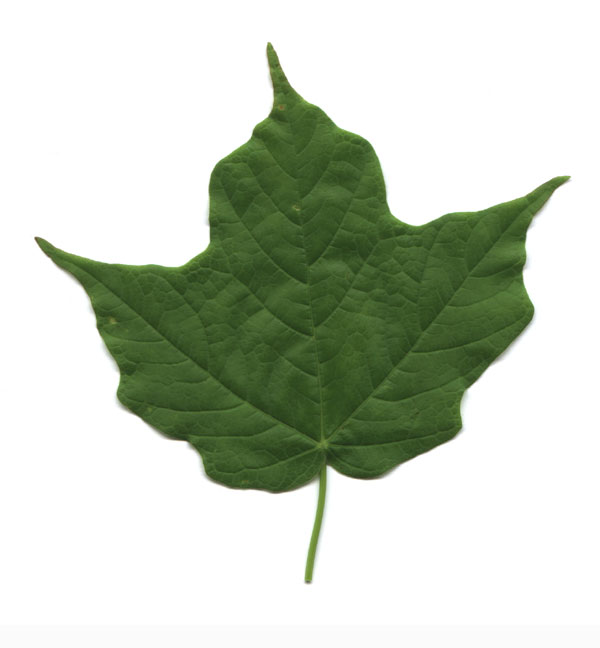
- Company type: Non-profit 501(c)(3) grassroots movement
- Founded: Stanford Law School (2007)
- Headquarters: Stanford, CA, United States
- Website: BBLP Website

Building a Better Legal Profession (BBLP) was a non-profit organization founded by students at Stanford Law School in 2007. It was a national grassroots movement for market-based BigLaw workplace reform which analyzed employment data at large private law firms to promote workplace reform at these companies by encouraging students to "vote with their feet" and select future employers based on quality-of-life and diversity criteria, rather than the pure prestige. BBLP's analysis was published by Kaplan as a book in 2009–2010.

== Law Firm Rankings and Report Cards ==
Example of BBLP Report Card.

Using data from the National Association for Legal Career Professionals (NALP), a system of report cards and rankings of law firms was created. BBLP used data from 11 major markets in the United States to show prospective hires what they could expect from a prospect law firm. Its BBLP Rankings covered an array of information that is important to future lawyers including firms' minimum billable hour requirements, average associate hours worked, demographic diversity, average pro bono hours, and the number of part-time attorneys.

The BBLP produced BBLP Rankings and also produced BBLP Report Cards on the major American legal marketplaces, such as in Boston, Chicago, Manhattan, Washington D.C, as well as the major American large law firms, including Allen & Overy, and Linklaters.

=== Building a Better Legal Profession's Guide to Law Firms ===
In April 2009, Kaplan published Building a Better Legal Profession's Guide to Law Firms: The Law Students Guide to Finding the Perfect Law Firm Job. The book used BBLP's online reports and guides to give career guidance and stories from the professionals already at the legal firms reviewed.

== Membership ==
Building a Better Legal Profession had over 1,400 members across the country, with a presence at Stanford Law School, Harvard Law School, Yale Law School, Columbia Law School and NYU Law School, among others.

== Media attention ==
The BBLP gained national media attention with traditional mainstream media with coverage from CBS, The Wall Street Journal, The New York Times, the Los Angeles Times, and The Boston Globe. The BBLP has been covered in legal newspapers and legal journals as well including articles from Legal Times, the ABA Journal, and the National Law Journal.

== Bibliography ==
- Irene Hahn (April 2009). Building a Better Legal Profession's Guide to Law Firms: The Law Student's Guide to Finding the Perfect Law Firm. Kaplan Publishing. p. 300. ISBN 978-1427798381.
