= Andrew W. Needham =

American lawyer

- Born: Albany, New York
- Education: University of Arizona; Georgetown University; Wharton School
- Occupation: Tax lawyer
- Employer: Cravath, Swaine & Moore

Andrew W. Needham is an American tax lawyer who was formerly a partner at Cravath, Swaine & Moore. He joined the law firm as its first lateral partner in 2005 from Willkie Farr & Gallagher, and retired from Cravath and from private practice in 2021.

== Biography ==
A native of Albany, New York, Needham attended the University of Arizona, receiving his B.A. in 1982. He earned his J.D. from Georgetown University Law Center in 1986, as well as his Master of Laws in Taxation LL.M. in 1990. Needham also received an M.B.A. from the Wharton School of the University of Pennsylvania in 1992.

== Career ==
Needham became a partner at Willkie Farr & Gallagher in 1997. He joined Cravath, Swaine & Moore in 2005 as a lateral partner, moving from Willkie Farr & Gallagher. At the time, he was widely reported to be the first true lateral partner Cravath had hired in more than six decades, a rare exception to the firm’s traditional promotion-from-within practice. He served as a partner in Cravath’s Tax Department from 2005 until his retirement at the end of 2021.

During his tenure, his tax practice centered on advising clients regarding domestic and cross-border mergers & acquisitions, spin-offs, private equity fund formation, and partnership taxation. Needham was among the Cravath partners who advised Johnson & Johnson in its 2011 purchase of Synthes, Inc. for $21.3 billion, then the largest acquisition by Johnson & Johnson in its history. Needham retired in 2021.

Needham was also part of the Cravath team that advised New Media Investment Group in its 2019 acquisition of Gannett Co., which created the largest newspaper publisher in the United States.

In addition to his professional experience, Needham also held leadership and service roles outside of the firm, including serving as the Chair of the Tax Section of the New York State Bar Association in 2012.

Needham has been active in legal education and professional forums. He has spoken at major conferences, including a 2009 ABA CLE meeting on tax issues involving partnership interest redemptions and transfers, and at the Practicing Law Institute’s 2018 Tax Planning Conference, where he discussed the use of Section 704(c) in partnership taxation.

From 2012 until his retirement in 2021, Needham was ranked by Chambers USA in “Band 1” of the top tax lawyers in New York. He has also been repeatedly recognized as a leading tax practitioner by The Legal 500 US, The Best Lawyers in America, Who’s Who Legal: Corporate Tax and other publications. Following his retirement from Cravath, Needham has served as an adjunct law professor at New York University law school, where he teaches a class on the taxation of private equity funds and their investors.

Scholarly works

Needham is a recognized authority in tax law, particularly in the areas of private equity and fund formation. His scholarly and policy-related contributions include authoring the tax treatise Private Equity Funds (Tax Management, Inc.), which has been updated over time and is widely used in fund-formation and planning. He also authored the tax treatise Hedge Funds (Tax Management, Inc.).

== Publications ==
He is the author of several works on tax management, including articles, books and continually updated resources manuals such as Private Equity Funds. Publications include:

- Guide to Tax Planning for Private Equity Funds and Portfolio Investments: Part 1 and 2; Willkie Farr & Gallagher; 2002
- Private Equity Funds; Tax Management, Incorporated, 2010, updated 2015, ISBN 9781633590700
- 735-3rd T.M., Private Equity Funds. 735-3rd
- 736-2nd T.M., Hedge Funds
- Bonus Depreciation: Basis Adjustments under Subchapter K, 160 Tax Notes 41 (2018)
- The Problem with Stuffing Allocations, 147 Tax Notes 737 (2013)
- Do the Market Discount Rules Apply to Distressed Debt?: Probably Not,” Journal of Tax’n of Financial Instruments (2009)
