= Robert Joffe =

American lawyer

Robert D. Joffe
- Born: May 26, 1943; New York, New York
- Died: January 28, 2010 (aged 66); New York, New York
- Education: Harvard Law School, Harvard University
- Occupation: Lawyer

Robert D. Joffe (May 26, 1943 – January 28, 2010) was an American lawyer. One of the leading corporate lawyers in the United States, Joffe was a partner at prominent New York law firm Cravath, Swaine & Moore from 1975 until his death, and he was the firm's presiding partner from 1999 to 2006.

In 1989, Joffe successfully defended Time Inc. against a hostile bid by Paramount Communications. He handled Time Warner's purchase of Turner Broadcasting System in 1996 as well as the merger with AOL in 2001. In 2008, he represented Bank of America in the acquisition of Merrill Lynch.

He died on January 28, 2010, from pancreatic cancer, aged 66.
