= Peter Beshar =

American attorney

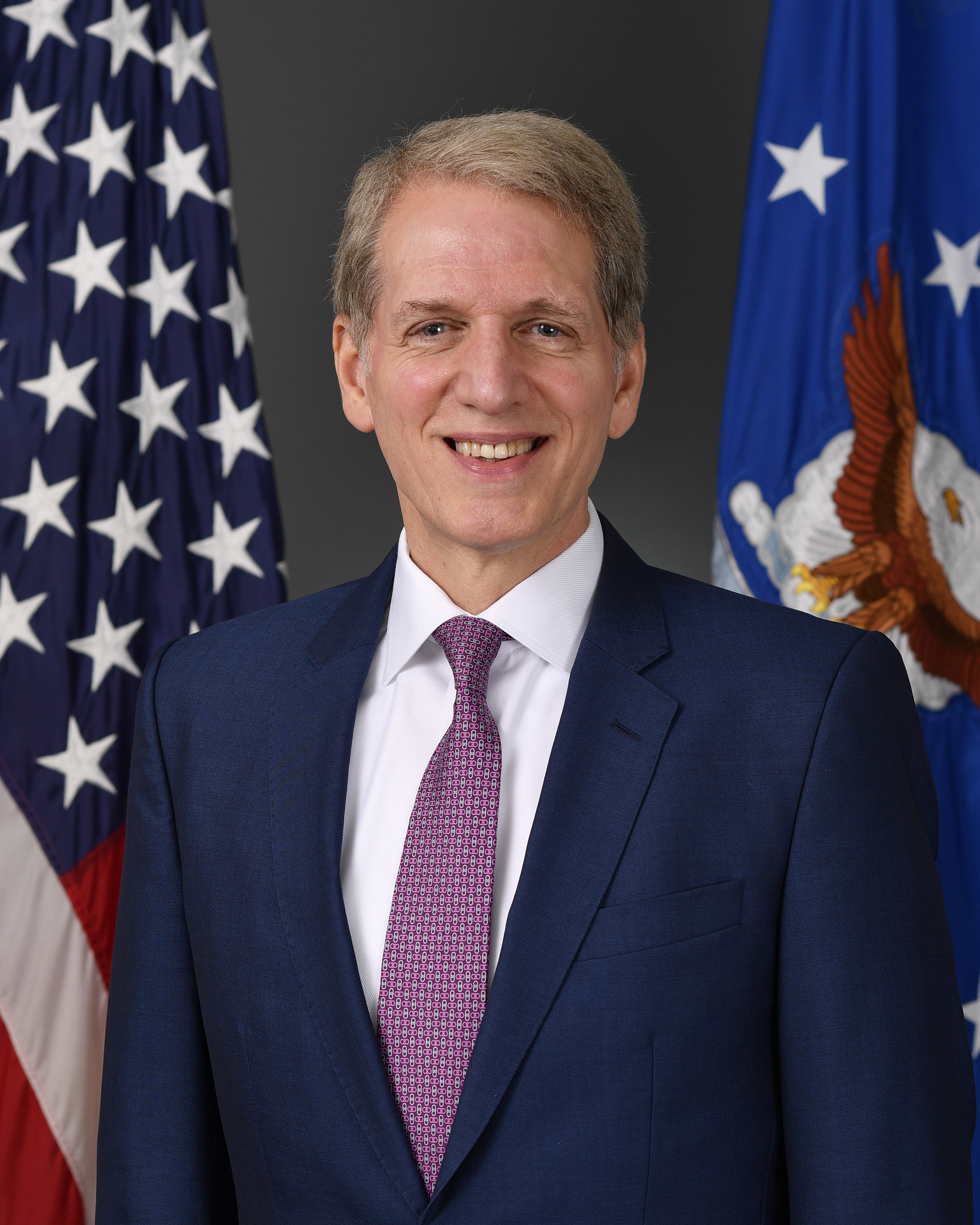

General Counsel of the Department of the Air Force
- In office March 18, 2022 – January 20, 2025
- President: Joe Biden
- Secretary: Frank Kendall III
- Preceded by: Thomas E. Ayres
- Succeeded by: William K. Lane III

Personal details
- Spouse: Sarah Elizabeth Eggleston Jones (m. 1995)
- Children: 3
- Education: Yale University (BA); Harvard University (JD)

Peter Justus Beshar is an American attorney who had served as general counsel of the Department of the Air Force. Beshar has previously worked in various roles at Marsh McLennan for 17 years.

== Education ==
Beshar earned a Bachelor of Arts degree from Yale University in 1984 and a Juris Doctor from Harvard Law School in 1989.

== Career ==
Beshar served as a law clerk for Judge Vincent L. Broderick. In 1992 and 1993, Beshar worked as an advisor to Secretary of State Cyrus Vance. He later served as assistant attorney general of New York, where he managed the New York State Attorney General's Task Force on Illegal Firearms. From 1995 to 2004, he worked at Gibson Dunn as co-chair of the firm's Securities Litigation Group. Beshar joined Marsh McLennan in 2004 and has since worked as executive vice president and general counsel of the company. Beshar was appointed to the board of trustees of the Woodrow Wilson International Center for Scholars by President Barack Obama in 2015.

Beshar has written op-ed columns on cyberwarfare and cybercrime policy for The Washington Post, The New York Times, Fortune, Fast Company, and U.S. News & World Report.

=== Air Force nomination ===
On October 19, 2021, President Joe Biden nominated Beshar to be the next general counsel of the air force. The Senate Armed Services Committee held hearings on his nomination on February 15, 2022. The committee favorably reported his nomination to the Senate floor on March 8, 2022. The entire Senate confirmed Beshar's nomination on March 10, 2022, by voice vote.

== Personal life ==
Beshar married Sarah Elizabeth Eggleston Jones, also a lawyer, in 1995. They have three children and live in Rye, New York. He is the son of Christine Beshar, who was named partner at Cravath, Swaine & Moore in 1971, making her the first woman to do so, and becoming one of the first women to be named partner in any Wall Street law firm.
