= Christine Beshar =

American lawyer (1929–2018)

- Beshar in 1973
- Born: Christine Luise Luitgarde Annette von Wedemeyer; November 6, 1929; Patzig, Free State of Prussia, Germany
- Died: January 11, 2018 (aged 88); Manhattan, New York, United States
- Education: Smith College (BA)
- Occupation: Attorney
- Employer: Cravath, Swaine & Moore
- Children: 4, including Peter Beshar

Christine Beshar (née von Wedemeyer; November 6, 1929 – January 11, 2018) was an American lawyer who specialized in estate law and trusts. She was the first woman to become a partner at the firm Cravath, Swaine & Moore. She successfully proposed that the firm open an on-site daycare facility for employees in 1989, a first for a major New York law firm. Beshar was born in Germany and attended Smith College on a Fulbright scholarship. She passed the New York bar exam despite never attending law school.

== Early life and education ==
Christine Luise Luitgarde Annette von Wedemeyer was born in Patzig, Germany, on November 6, 1929, to Prussian farmers Ruth von Kleist-Retzow and Hans von Wedemeyer. Her father died in World War II. She attended the University of Hamburg in 1951 and the University of Tübingen in 1952. She was awarded a Fulbright scholarship and attended Smith College in the United States, earning a bachelor's degree in 1953.

== Legal career ==
Beshar worked briefly as a switchboard operator at a small law firm making $55 per week. She was then hired as an assistant librarian for the firm Davis Polk. She gained legal experience, reading books on constitutional law, contracts and rules of evidence. For four years, she clerked for her husband's law firm, working as his assistant while he was representing Sperry & Hutchinson. Though she never attended law school, in 1959 she passed the New York bar on her first attempt. In the late 1950s and early 1960s, she had four children.

Beshar was hired at the law firm Cravath, Swaine & Moore in 1964. She became the firm's first female partner in 1971 (Note: Some sources say she became a partner in 1970.) and was among the first women to be a partner in a Wall Street law firm. She specialized in estate law and trusts, advising clients on philanthropy and estate planning. After Cravath moved its offices to Worldwide Plaza in midtown Manhattan, she proposed that the firm establish an on-site childcare facility for its employees in 1989. Cravath was the first major law firm in New York to do so.

Beshar retired in 1999. She was named counsel in 2000 and senior counsel in Cravath's trusts and estates department in 2009. She died on January 11, 2018, in Manhattan.

== Personal life ==
Christine met Yale graduate and lawyer Robert P. Beshar on a blind date. They married in Germany in 1953. He worked for Sullivan & Cromwell and represented Sperry & Hutchinson. They returned to the United States and Christine gained citizenship in 1957. They had four children. From 1971, they lived in a co-op building at 120 East End Avenue and spent weekends at a second home in Putnam County. Their family was featured in a 1988 article in The New York Times about children of "superachieving couples". Her son Peter is the general counsel of the Department of the Air Force.
