= Law firm =

Business entity formed to practice law

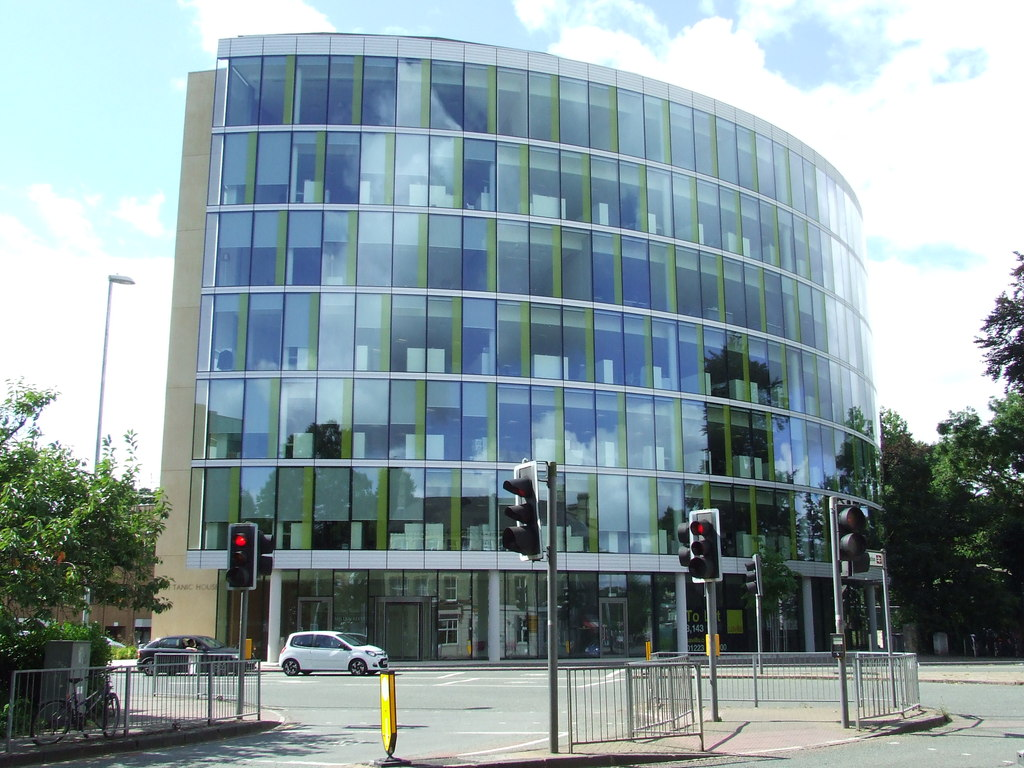
A law firm Mills & Reeve at the Botanic House, 100 Hills Road, Cambridge, England

A law firm is a business entity formed by one or more lawyers to engage in the practice of law. The primary service rendered by a law firm is to advise clients (individuals or corporations) about their legal rights and responsibilities, and to represent clients in civil or criminal cases, business transactions, and other matters in which legal advice and other assistance are sought.

== Arrangements ==
Law firms are organized in a variety of ways, depending on the jurisdiction in which the firm practices. Common arrangements include:

- Sole proprietorship, in which the attorney is the law firm and is responsible for all profit, loss and liability;
- General partnership, in which all the attorneys who are members of the firm share ownership, profits and liabilities;
- Professional corporations, which issue stock to the attorneys in a fashion similar to that of a business corporation;
- Limited liability company, in which the attorney-owners are called "members" but are not directly liable to third party creditors of the law firm (prohibited as against public policy in many jurisdictions but allowed in others in the form of a "Professional Limited Liability Company" or "PLLC");
- Professional association, which operates similarly to a professional corporation or a limited liability company;
- Limited liability partnership (LLP), in which the attorney-owners are partners with one another, but no partner is liable to any creditor of the law firm nor is any partner liable for any negligence on the part of any other partner. The LLP is taxed as a partnership while enjoying the liability protection of a corporation.

=== Restrictions on ownership interests ===
In many countries, including the United States, there is a rule that only lawyers may have an ownership interest in, or be managers of, a law firm. Thus, law firms cannot quickly raise capital through initial public offerings on the stock market, like most corporations. They must either raise capital through additional capital contributions from existing or additional equity partners, or must take on debt, usually in the form of a line of credit secured by their accounts receivable.

In the United States this complete bar to nonlawyer ownership has been codified by the American Bar Association as paragraph (d) of Rule 5.4 of the Model Rules of Professional Conduct and has been adopted in one form or another in all U.S. jurisdictions, except the District of Columbia and Arizona. However, D.C.'s rule is narrowly tailored to allow equity ownership only by those nonlawyer partners who actively assist the firm's lawyers in providing legal services, and does not allow for the sale of ownership shares to mere passive nonlawyer investors. The U.K. had a similar rule barring nonlawyer ownership, but under reforms implemented by the Legal Services Act of 2007 law firms have been able to take on a limited number of non-lawyer partners and lawyers have been allowed to enter into a wide variety of business relationships with non-lawyers and non-lawyer owned businesses. This has allowed, for example, grocery stores, banks and community organizations to hire lawyers to provide in-store and online basic legal services to customers.

The rule is controversial. It is justified by many in the legal profession, notably the American Bar Association which rejected a proposal to change the rule in its Ethics 20/20 reforms, as necessary to prevent conflicts of interest. In the adversarial system of justice, a lawyer has a duty to be a zealous and loyal advocate on behalf of the client, and also has a duty to not bill the client excessively. Also, as an officer of the court, a lawyer has a duty to be honest and to not file frivolous cases or raise frivolous defenses. Many in the legal profession believe that a lawyer working as a shareholder-employee of a publicly traded law firm might be tempted to evaluate decisions in terms of their effect on the stock price and the shareholders, which would directly conflict with the lawyer's duties to the client and to the courts. Critics of the rule, however, believe that it is an inappropriate way of protecting clients' interests and that it severely limits the potential for the innovation of less costly and higher quality legal services that could benefit both ordinary consumers and businesses.

In 2020, Arizona became the first state (the District of Columbia is not a state) to authorize "alternative business structures" or "ABS" with nonlawyer owners. While not the first ABS authorized by the Arizona Supreme Court, KPMG was the first of the Big Four accounting firms to receive authorization as an ABS to deliver legal services in Arizona, but under the condition that it cannot provide legal services to clients for whom KPMG or its member firms were already providing audits or attestations.

=== Multinational law firms ===
Law firms operating in multiple countries often have complex structures involving multiple partnerships, particularly in jurisdictions such as Hong Kong and Japan which restrict partnerships between local and foreign lawyers. One structure largely unique to large multinational law firms is the Swiss Verein, pioneered by Baker McKenzie in 2004, in which multiple national or regional partnerships form an association in which they share branding, administrative functions and various operating costs, but maintain separate revenue pools and often separate partner compensation structures. Other multinational law firms operate as single worldwide partnerships, such as British or American limited liability partnerships, in which partners also participate in local operating entities in various countries as required by local regulations.

=== Financial indicators ===
Three financial statistics are typically used to measure and rank law firms' performance:

- Profits per equity partner (PPEP or PPP): Net operating income divided by number of equity partners. High PPP is often correlated with prestige of a firm and its attractiveness to potential equity partners. However, the indicator is prone to manipulation by re-classifying less profitable partners as non-equity partners.
- Revenue per lawyer (RPL): Gross revenue divided by number of lawyers. This statistic shows the revenue-generating ability of the firm's lawyers in general, but does not factor in the firm's expenses such as associate compensation and office overhead.
- Average compensation of partners (ACP): Total amount paid to equity and nonequity partners (i.e., net operating income plus nonequity partner compensation) divided by the total number of equity and nonequity partners. This results in a more inclusive statistic than PPP, but remains prone to manipulation by changing expense policies and re-classifying less profitable partners as associates.

== Structure and promotion ==
=== Partnership ===
Law firms are typically organized around partners, who are joint owners and business directors of the legal operation; associates, who are employees of the firm with the prospect of becoming partners; and a variety of staff employees, providing paralegal, clerical, and other support services. An associate may have to wait as long as 11 years before the decision is made as to whether the associate is made a partner. Many law firms have an "up or out policy", integral to the Cravath System, which had been pioneered during the early 20th century by partner Paul Cravath of Cravath, Swaine & Moore, and became widely adopted by, particularly, white-shoe firms; associates who do not make partner are required to resign, and may join another firm, become a solo practitioner, work in-house for a corporate legal department, or change professions. Burnout rates are notably high in the profession.

Making partner is very prestigious at large or mid-sized firms, due to the competition that results from higher associate-to-partner ratios. Such firms may take out advertisements in professional publications to announce who has made partner. Traditionally, partners shared directly in the profits of the firm, after paying salaried employees, the landlord, and the usual costs of furniture, office supplies, and books for the law library (or a database subscription). Partners in a limited liability partnership can largely operate autonomously with regard to cultivating new business and servicing existing clients within their book of business.

Partner compensation methods vary greatly among law firms. At major United States law firms, the "compensation spread" (ratio between the highest partner salary and lowest partner salary) among firms disclosing information ranges from 3:1 to 24:1. Higher spreads are intended to promote individual performance, while lower spreads are intended to promote teamwork and collegiality.

Many large law firms have moved to a two-tiered partnership model, with equity and non-equity partners. Equity partners are considered to have ownership stakes in the firm, and share in the profits (and losses) of the firm. Non-equity partners are generally paid a fixed salary (albeit much higher than associates), and they are often granted certain limited voting rights with respect to firm operations.

The oldest continuing partnership in the United States is that of Cadwalader, Wickersham & Taft, founded in 1792 in New York City. The oldest law firm in continuous practice in the United States is Rawle & Henderson, founded in 1783 in Philadelphia.

==== Termination of one's partnership ====
It is rare for a partner to be forced out by fellow partners, although that can happen if the partner commits a crime or malpractice, experiences disruptive mental illness, or is not contributing to the firm's overall profitability. However, some large firms have written into their partnership agreement a forced retirement age for partners, which can be anywhere from age 65 on up. In contrast, most corporate executives are at much higher risk of being fired, even when the underlying cause is not directly their fault, such as a drop in the company's stock price. Worldwide, partner retirement ages can be difficult to estimate and often vary widely, particularly because in many countries it is illegal to mandate a retirement age.

=== "Of counsel" role ===
In the United States, Canada and Japan, many large and midsize firms have attorneys with the job title of "counsel", "special counsel" or "of counsel". As the Supreme Court of California has noted, the title has acquired several related but distinct definitions which do not easily fit into the traditional partner-associate structure. These attorneys are people who work for the firm, like associates, although some firms have an independent contractor relationship with their counsel. But unlike associates, and more like partners, they generally have their own clients, manage their own cases, and supervise associates. These relationships are structured to allow more senior attorneys to share in the resources and "brand name" of the firm without being a part of management or profit sharing decisions. The title is often seen among former associates who do not make partner, or who are laterally recruited to other firms, or who work as in-house counsel and then return to the big firm environment. At some firms, the title "of counsel" is given to retired partners who maintain ties to the firm. Sometimes "of counsel" refers to senior or experienced attorneys, such as foreign legal consultants, with specialized experience in particular aspects of law and practice. They are hired as independent contractors by large firms as a special arrangement, which may lead to profitable results for the partnership. In certain situations "of counsel" could be considered to be a transitional status in the firm.

=== Mergers and acquisitions between law firms ===
Mergers, acquisitions, division and reorganizations occur between law firms as in other businesses. The specific books of business and specialization of attorneys as well as the professional ethical structures surrounding conflict of interest can lead to firms splitting up to pursue different clients or practices, or merging or recruiting experienced attorneys to acquire new clients or practice areas. Results often vary between firms experiencing such transitions. Firms that gain new practice areas or departments through recruiting or mergers that are more complex and demanding (and typically more profitable) may see the focus, organization and resources of the firm shift dramatically towards those new departments. Conversely, firms may be merged among experienced attorneys as partners for purposes of shared financing and resources, while the different departments and practice areas within the new firm retain a significant degree of autonomy.

Law firm mergers tend to be assortative, in that only law firms operating in similar legal systems are likely to merge. For example, U.S. firms will often merge with English law firms, or law firms from other common law jurisdictions. A notable exception is King & Wood Mallesons, a multinational law firm that is the result of a merger between an Australian law firm and a Chinese law firm.

Though mergers are more common among better economies, slowing down a bit during recessions, big firms sometimes use mergers as a strategy to boost revenue during a recession. Nevertheless, data from Altman Weil indicates that only four firms merged in the first half of 2013, as compared to eight in the same period in 2012, and this was taken by them as indicating a dip in morale regarding the legal economy and the amount of demand.

== Size ==
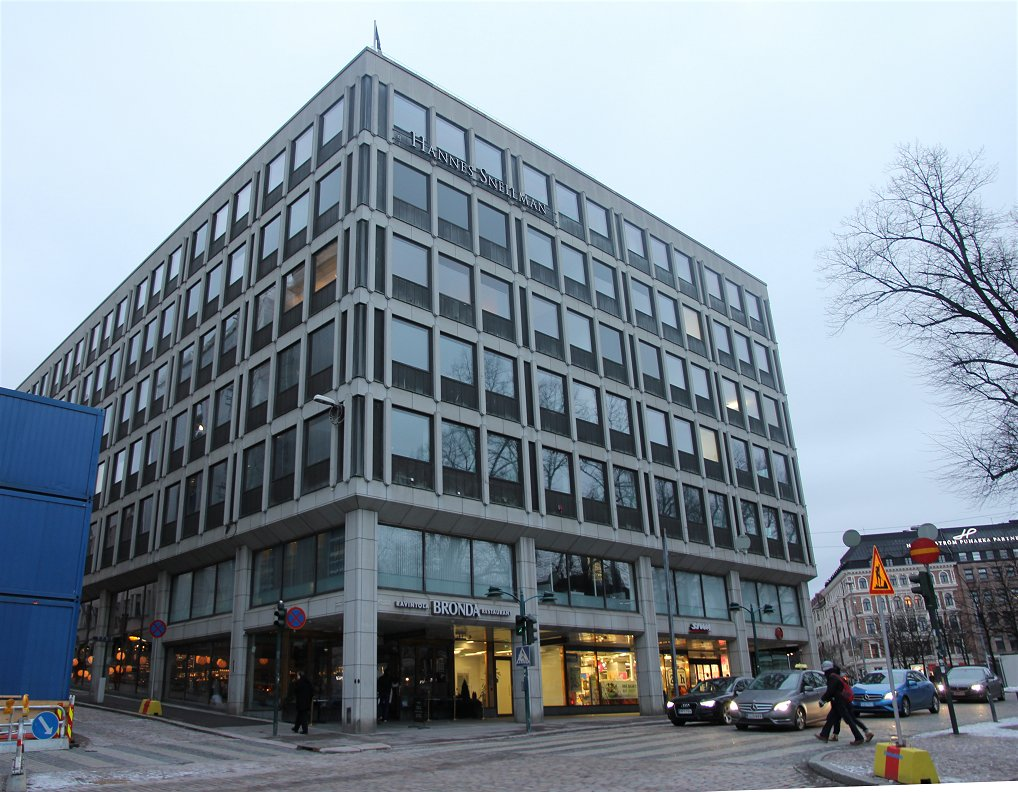
Building occupied by Hannes Snellman Attorneys Ltd, a major law firm operating in Finland, Sweden and Russia, on the Eteläesplanadi street in Helsinki, Uusimaa, Finland

Law firms can vary widely in size. The smallest law firms are lawyers practicing alone, who form the vast majority of law practices in nearly all countries.

Smaller firms tend to focus on particular specialties of the law (e.g., patent law, labor law, tax law, criminal defense, personal injury). Larger firms may be composed of several specialized practice groups, allowing the firm to diversify its client base and market, and to offer a variety of services to their clients.

Large law firms usually have separate litigation and transactional departments. The transactional department advises clients and handles transactional legal work, such as drafting contracts, handling necessary legal applications and filings, and evaluating and ensuring compliance with relevant law; while the litigation department represents clients in court and handles necessary matters (such as discovery and motions filed with the court) throughout the process of litigation.

=== Anglo-American development ===
==== Boutique law firms ====
Lawyers in small cities and towns may still have old-fashioned general practices, but most urban lawyers tend to be highly specialized due to the overwhelming complexity of the law today. Thus, some small firms in the cities specialize in practicing only one kind of law (like employment, antitrust, intellectual property, investment funds, telecommunications or aviation) and are called boutique law firms.

==== Virtual law firms ====
A 21st century development has been the appearance of the virtual law firm, a firm with a virtual business address but no brick & mortar office location open to the public, using modern telecommunications to operate from remote locations and provide its services to international clients, avoiding the costs of maintaining a physical premises with lower overheads than traditional law firms. This lower cost structure allows virtual law firms to bill clients on a contingency basis rather than by billable hours paid in advance by retainer.

Related innovations include alternative legal services provider (ALSP), legal outsourcing and what is sometimes called "NewLaw".

The largest law firms have more than 1,000 lawyers. These firms, often colloquially called "megafirms" or "BigLaw", generally have offices on several continents. Senior lawyers in BigLaw firms bill US$750 per hour or higher, and have a high ratio of support staff per attorney. Because of the localized and regional nature of firms, the relative size of a firm varies.

=== BigLaw firms ===
The largest U.S.-based firms are often referenced as "BigLaw" firms, a phrase often used to describe large law firms that follow the Cravath System's "loosely pyramid-shaped hierarchy of advancement". BigLaw firms typically specialize in all categories of legal work with high billable hour rates, including mergers and acquisitions transactions, banking, and corporate litigation. These firms rarely do plaintiffs' personal injury work. However, in terms of revenue and employee headcount, the largest law firms are still smaller than their counterparts in other types of professional services like consulting and accounting.

In 2008, the largest law firm in the world was the British firm Clifford Chance, which had revenue of over US$2 billion. In 2020, Kirkland & Ellis came out on top with US$4.15 billion in revenue while Hogan Lovells rounded out the list at number ten with US$2.25 billion. Clifford Chance remains the only British firm among the top 10 considered "BigLaw". This can be compared with $404 billion for the world's largest firm by turnover ExxonMobil and $28 billion for the largest professional services firm Deloitte.

In BigLaw firms, compensation is high compared to other workplaces. Median salaries for associates range from $200,000 to $330,000. This range varies based on years worked as an associate, calculated up to the eighth year: first-year associates make a median of $200,000, while eighth-year associates make a median of $330,000. Compensation for lawyers in BigLaw firms is typically organized in an hourly rate structure, where lawyers charge per hour on a billable time structure. Hourly rates vary greatly depending on the lawyer, whether they are a partner or an associate, with other factors taken into consideration. As of 2024, the highest lawyers have a rate of $2,100 to $2,620 per hour, with other partners charging $1,285 to $1,860. Many lawyers in these firms charge in the $800-900 range as well. Researchers created a top 32 list of firms that charge the most, the former figures being most prominent in these firms. As of early 2026, BigLaw lawyer fees have been surging, with one top US firm charging $4,000 per hour for its top partners.

=== Worldwide ===
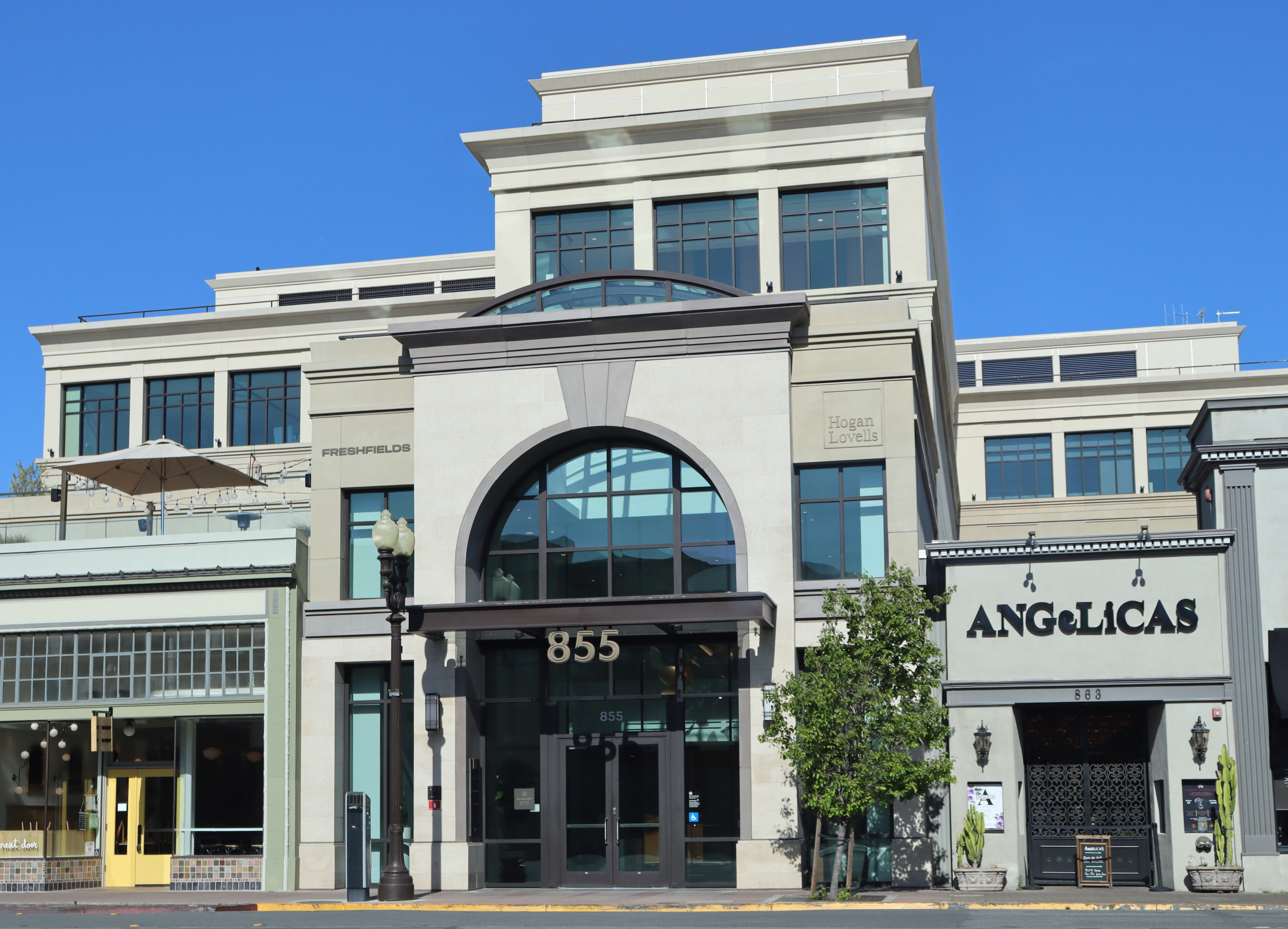
British law firms in Silicon Valley: As of 2025, this Redwood City, California office building was home to branch offices of Hogan Lovells and Freshfields Bruckhaus Deringer

The largest law firms in the world are headquartered primarily in the United Kingdom, where they are deemed part of the Magic Circle, and in the United States, where they are known as "BigLaw" firms. Large firms of more than 1,000 lawyers are also found in Australia (MinterEllison, 1,500 attorneys), China (Dacheng, 2,100 attorneys) and Spain (Garrigues, 2,100 attorneys). The American system of licensing attorneys on a state-by-state basis, the tradition of having a headquarters in a single U.S. state and a close focus on profits per partner (as opposed to sheer scale) has to date limited the size of most American law firms. Thus, whilst the most profitable law firms in the world remain in New York, four of the six largest firms in the world are based in London in the United Kingdom. The sheer size of the United States results in a larger number of large firms overall – a 2003 paper noted that the U.S. had 901 law firms with more than 50 lawyers, while there were only 58 such firms in Canada, 44 in Great Britain, 14 in France, and 9 in Germany. During the 21st century, law firms have increased activity in transatlantic mergers, with globalisation of firms reaching an all-time peak in 2021. Both UK and U.S. firms are reported as continuing to seek an increasingly global reach, through mergers and acquisitions, in 2024.

Due to their size, the U.S.- and U.K.-based law firms are the most prestigious and powerful in the world, and they tend to dominate the international market for legal services. A 2007 research paper noted that firms from other countries merely pick up their leftovers: "[M]uch of the competition is relatively orderly whereby predominantly Australian, New Zealand, and Canadian firms compete for business not required by English or American law firms."

Since the early 1970s, the largest U.K. law firms have struggled to break into the much larger U.S. legal market, with only limited success in establishing footholds along the East Coast in important markets like New York City. In 2020, several of the largest U.K. firms began to invest in expansion into multiple regions of the United States, such as Silicon Valley. However, as of early 2024, the largest U.K. firms were losing ground on their home turf in London to rapid growth by the largest U.S. firms and were forced to raise salaries in response. The Americans recruited many British solicitors by offering more generous salaries, but also brought with them a different work-life balance, with higher billable hours requirements and the American expectation that lawyers routinely work on weekends.

=== Recession ===
As a result of the U.S. recession of 2007 to 2009, many American law firms downsized personnel, while others permanently shuttered. On February 12, 2009, Bloomberg reported that 700 jobs were cut during that single day at law firms nationwide. The Denver Post reported that major law firms cut more than 10,000 jobs nationwide in 2009. Among closed firms of the era was Heller Ehrman, a San Francisco-based law practice established in 1890. Similarly, Halliwells of the UK was dissolved in 2010. Law firm layoffs became so common that trade publications like American Lawyer produced an ongoing "Layoff List" of the law firms nationwide experiencing personnel cuts.

== Salaries ==
Law firm salary structures typically depend on firm size. Small-firm salaries vary widely within countries and from one country to the next, and are not often publicly available. Because most countries do not have unified legal professions, there are often significant disparities in income among the various legal professions within a particular country. Finally, the availability of salary data also depends upon the existence of journalists and sociologists able to collect and analyze such data.

=== United States ===
The U.S. is currently the only country with enough lawyers, as well as journalists and sociologists who specialize in studying them, to have widely available data on salary structures at major law firms.

In 2006, median salaries of new graduates ranged from US$50,000 per year in small firms (two to ten attorneys) to US$160,000 per year in very large firms (more than 501 attorneys). The distribution of these salaries was highly bimodal, with the majority of new lawyers earning at either the high end or the low end of the scale, and a median salary of US$62,000. In the summer of 2016, New York law firm Cravath, Swaine & Moore raised its first-year associate salary to $180,000. Many other high-end New York-based and large national law firms soon followed. Two years later, in the summer of 2018, New York law firm Milbank raised its first-year associate salary to $190,000, with other major firms following shortly thereafter. In 2022 Milbank increased first-year compensation to $215,000, with most comparable firms following suit.

The traditional salary model for law firm associates is lockstep compensation, in which associate salaries go up by a fixed amount each year from the associate's law school graduation. However, many firms have switched to a level-based compensation system, in which associates are divided into three (or sometimes four) levels based on skills mastered. In 2013, the median salaries for the three associate levels were $152,500, $185,000 and $216,000 among large firms (more than 700 lawyers), and $122,000, $143,500 and $160,000 among all firms.

Some prominent law firms, like Goodwin Procter and Paul Hastings, give generous signing bonuses (e.g., $20,000) to incoming first-year associates who hold JD/MBA degrees.

Another way law firm associates increase their earnings or improve their employment conditions is through a lateral move to another law firm. A 2014 survey by LexisNexis indicated that over 95% of law firms consulted intended to hire lateral attorneys within the next two years. Though the success for both the attorney and the law firms in lateral hiring has been questioned. The National Law Review reported that the cost of recruiting, compensating, and integrating a lateral attorney can be upwards of $600,000 and that 60% of lateral attorney hires fail to thrive at their new law firms.

As of 2024, the median pay among lawyers is $151,160. Based on a 2026 report, the overall national mean attorney salary in the United States is $176,470. In BigLaw firms, median salaries for associates range from $200,000 to $330,000. This range varies based on years worked as an associate, calculated up to the eighth year: first-year associates make a median of $200,000, while eighth-year associates make a median of $330,000. On the other hand, solo practitioners make an average of $65,000.

=== United Kingdom ===
British firms typically practise lockstep compensation. In London, entry-level solicitor salaries (NQ - Newly Qualified) are typically: (i) £40,000–70,000 at boutique and national firms, (ii) £80,000–100,000 at magic circle firms, and (iii) £120,000–155,000 at London offices of leading US firms.

A senior associate with six years' experience may make £68,000-120,000 at a national firm or upwards of £160,000 at a global firm. Salary levels are lower in areas outside London.

=== Australia ===
Australia has regional variation in lawyer salaries, with the highest salary levels in Sydney, followed by Melbourne, Perth, Brisbane, then Adelaide. Salaries vary between top-tier, mid-size, and small firms. At top-tier firms in Sydney, salaries of lawyers who have been admitted to practice range from $75,000 to $92,000 and partners make on average $1,215,000. In Sydney, mid-tier starting salaries for admitted lawyers range from between $65,000 and $82,000. Most Australian lawyers are not admitted until ten months into their time at their law firm, since the initial period involves supervised legal training before admission is granted.

Typically in Australian firms lawyers are in a lock-step system for the first two years of practice, following which pay increases are dependent on performance assessed, in large measure, by satisfaction of billable hour targets.

=== Hong Kong ===
Newly qualified associates at leading firms in Hong Kong typically make HK$840,000 to HK$948,000, with partners in the HK$1.6 million to HK$4 million+ range; many firms pay New York salaries with cost of living adjustments.

=== Korea (South Korea) ===
Newly qualified lawyers at leading law firms in Korea typically make between KRW 80,000,000 to KRW 90,000,000 per year.

=== Singapore ===
At local firms in Singapore, associates in their first three years typically make $60,000 to $100,000, while midlevel (4–7 years) associates make $110,000 to $180,000 and senior (8+ years) associates make $160,000 or more. International firms pay significantly more, with senior associates often making more than $250,000.

=== India ===
There is more information available for entry level associates. First-year lawyers may earn anywhere between INR 8,000 to INR 1,10,000 per month. Tier 1 law firms provide the best pay package, of about INR 15,00,000 annually. There is a wide difference in the salary range depending on the city, law firm, and university of the candidate. For instance, the salary is higher in cities like Mumbai and Delhi NCR as opposed to other cities like Kolkata, Pune, Ahmedabad, etc.

== Rankings ==
Law firms are ranked both objectively, such as by revenue, profits per partner, and subjectively, by various legal publishers and journalists.

As legal practice is adversarial, law firm rankings are widely relied on by prospective associates, lateral hires and legal clients. Subjective rankings typically cover practice areas such as The American Lawyer's Corporate Scorecard and Top IP Firms. Work place rankings are directed toward lawyers or law students, and cover such topics as quality of life, hours, family friendliness and salaries. Finally, statistical rankings generally cover profit-related data such as profits per partner and revenue per lawyer. Third party attorney ranking services such as Chambers and Partners and Martindale-Hubbell are generally very competitive and can help raise an individual attorney's professional profile, and to catch this marketing advantage, over 1,200 attorney ranking and or awards have sprung up in the U.S. Various state bar associations have taken notice of the prolific growth of attorney honor awards and have determined that lawyers may refer to such honors in advertising "only when the basis for comparison can be verified" and the organization providing the award "has made adequate inquiry into the fitness of the individual lawyer".

In an October 2007 press conference reported in The Wall Street Journal and The New York Times, the law student group Building a Better Legal Profession released its first annual ranking of top law firms by average billable hours, pro bono participation, and demographic diversity. Most notably, the report ranked the percentages of women, African Americans, Hispanics, Asian Americans, and gays and lesbians at America's top law firms. The group has sent the information to top law schools around the country, encouraging students to take this demographic data into account when choosing where to work after graduation. As more students choose where to work based on the firms' diversity rankings, firms face an increasing market pressure in order to attract top recruits.

== In popular culture ==
A number of television shows, movies and books have revolved around relationships occurring in fictional law firms, highlighting both public fascination with and misperception of the lives of lawyers in high-powered settings.

Suits is a popular American legal drama television series. Boston Legal is a popular American comedy drama, a spin-off of another long running series created by David E. Kelley, The Practice.

The film The Firm was adapted from a book written by John Grisham.

The television series Better Call Saul features several fictional law firms.

== See also ==
- Immigration lawyer
- List of largest law firms by revenue
- List of largest law firms by profits per partner
- Book of business (law)
- Law firm network
- Multidisciplinary professional services networks
- White-shoe firm
- AI hallucinations — Attorney and law firm examples
