= Cravath System =

Set of business management principles first developed at Cravath, Swaine & Moore

The Cravath System is a set of business management principles first developed at Cravath, Swaine & Moore.

John Oller, author of White Shoe, credits Paul Drennan Cravath with creating the model in the early 20th century, which was adopted by virtually all white-shoe law firms, fifty years before the phrase white shoe came into popular use. The Cravath System has been adopted by many leading law firms, management consulting firms, and investment banks in the United States.

== Components ==
Paul Cravath built a reputation handling complex lawsuits for the new electrical industry. Devising the Cravath System, he enlarged the law office and professionalised it by establishing full-time librarians, a recruiting system focused solely on the highest-ranked law schools, and partners who specialized. Robert Swaine describes the fundamentals of the Cravath System in the beginning of "Volume II The Cravath Firm since 1906" of The Cravath Firm and Its Predecessors, 1819-1947. These include:

Recruiting staff
Paul Cravath sought to hire only the "best of the best" and recruited primarily from the law schools of Harvard, Yale, and Columbia. Graduates were expected to be members of the Phi Beta Kappa/Beta Gamma Sigma system, and to have served as editors of their respective school's law review. A graduate from a university outside of the top five was expected to be, at a minimum, the equivalent of a "B" student at Harvard or Columbia over time. Distinctly, only new law graduates or those who had served as clerks after law school were to be hired, except in rare circumstances, to avoid previously developed habits, outside the Cravath System, coming to the firm's culture.
Training staff
Associates would be assigned to a partner (typically for up to 18 months). Associates would learn to break down large tasks into manageable pieces to lead. The view was that each associate would serve as an apprentice of a partner's practice, training under close supervision and guidance.
Compensation
The system practices lockstep compensation. Early practices at law firms paid associates nothing except what they could bring in for themselves. By 1910, Cravath was one of the first to hire incoming lawyers on a salary. Since Cravath preferred to hire the best and remunerate them very well, this led to wide disparities in starting salaries in the legal industry. Collusion among law firms and schools led to uniform starting salaries across law firms from the end of World War I until World War II, but this stopped once the top law firms salaries reached parity soon after.
Tenure
Generally, only partners may have permanent employment at the firm. As long as an associate was deemed worthy of promotion, they may stay. Associates who were not suitable for promotion were dismissed in a strictly enforced "up or out" staffing policy.
Choosing partners
Unless there is some exceptional need for expertise unavailable within the firm, partners should be chosen and promoted only from within the office.
Interests outside the firm
Partners and associates may not have business interests outside the firm. Charitable, educational and artistic interests are permitted with permission from the senior partner. There are no part time associates and partners, and all business in the office is company business and not individual.
Relationships of the partners
Partners are expected to work with each other; silos and cliques are to be strictly avoided so as to foster trust and a firmwide esprit de corps.
Scope of the practice
Cravath handled predominantly civil law matters in the early years; the majority of firms adopting this system are also civil law firms.
Management
Cravath believed that a firm must have strong executive direction, led by the senior partner who was elected by the partnership for a limited term.

== See also ==
- History of the American legal profession
