= Professional corporation =

Corporation organized for licensed professionals

Professional corporations or professional service corporations (abbreviated as PC or PSC) are those corporate entities for which many corporation statutes make special provision, regulating the use of the corporate form by licensed professionals such as lawyers, architects, engineers, public accountants and physicians. The general category of the PC or PSC can be as S-corporation, C-corporation, or LLC, but with subcategorization as a PC or PSC. Legal regulations applying to professional corporations typically differ in important ways from those applying to other corporations. Unlike a traditional corporation, operation as a professional corporation does not insulate a professional for personal liability for her own negligence or malpractice. The principal reason why groups of professions choose to organize as a professional corporation is that, unlike a general partnership, an owner is not personally liable for the negligence or malpractice of other owners. In some states a limited liability partnership offer the same benefit and thus should be considered as a possible business entity by professionals who are forming a business.

Professional corporations may have a single director or multiple directors. They do not usually afford directors the same degree of limitation of liability as ordinary business corporations (cf. LLP). Such corporations must identify themselves as professional corporations by including "PC" or "P.C." after the firm's name.

Professional corporations may exist as part of a larger, more complicated, legal entity; for example, a law firm or medical practice might be organized as a partnership of several or many professional corporations.

== Legal effect ==
=== United States ===
In U.S. federal subject matter jurisdiction, professional corporations have two citizenships for purposes of diversity, just like ordinary corporations, namely that they are citizens of (1) the state in which they are incorporated and (2) the state in which they have their principal place of business. This is unlike other, similar organizations that are not technically "corporations," such as trade associations, labor unions, partnerships (including limited partnerships and limited liability partnerships), and limited liability companies, for which citizenship is based on the domicile of each member. This has the effect of expanding diversity jurisdiction in suits to which the professional corporation is a party compared to these alternate forms of business organization, thereby expanding the professional corporation's access to the federal courts, which may be advantageous to the firm. Specific requirements of corporations vary significantly from state to state.

== See also ==
- Profession § Autonomy
