= Quinn Emanuel Urquhart & Sullivan =

American law firm

Quinn Emanuel Urquhart & Sullivan, LLP
- Headquarters: TCW Tower; Los Angeles, California
- No. of offices: 35
- No. of attorneys: 1,000+
- Major practice areas: Litigation only
- Key people: John Quinn
- Revenue: ▲$1.25 billion (2019)
- Date founded: January 1, 1986; 40 years ago
- Founder: John B. Quinn, Eric Emanuel, David Quinto, Phyllis Kupferstein
- Company type: Limited liability partnership
- Website: quinnemanuel.com

Quinn Emanuel Urquhart & Sullivan, LLP is an American white-shoe law firm headquartered in Los Angeles, California. The firm employs approximately 1,000 attorneys throughout 35 offices around the world.

== History ==
The firm was established in 1986 by John B. Quinn, Eric Emanuel, David Quinto, and Phyllis Kupferstein, with the purpose of being a litigation-only firm. In 1988, A. William "Bill" Urquhart decided to join the two-year-old firm, which became Quinn Emanuel & Urquhart, and soon later Quinn Emanuel Urquhart & Oliver with the addition of Dale Hugh Oliver. Another name partner George Hedges was hired in 1998 to increase the firm's Hollywood presence, and the firm was known as Quinn Emanuel Urquhart Oliver & Hedges for over a decade.

Quinn Emanuel is the first AmLaw 100 firm to have a female name partner. The firm changed its name in March 2010 to include Kathleen Sullivan, former Dean of Stanford Law School, who heads the firm's appellate practice.

In 2014, the firm was the subject of a Freedom of Information Act request by Microsoft, in connection with a contract it had supposedly signed with the IRS.

Intellectual property litigation is the firm's largest practice area and the firm currently has over 200 lawyers who litigate IP cases. Quinn Emanuel represented the Winklevoss twins' social network, ConnectU, in its lawsuit that accused Facebook founder Mark Zuckerberg of stealing ideas for his own social network. The parties reached a confidential settlement, yet Quinn Emanuel later revealed the confidential settlement amount of $65 million in a firm advertisement.

In 2024, as part of the Sean Combs sexual misconduct allegations, Tony Buzbee filed a lawsuit against Jay-Z's company Roc Nation, Quinn Emanuel—which employs Carter's attorneys—and others, claiming that these parties were attempting to sway his clients into suing him and his firm, the Buzbee Law Firm. According to Buzbee, Roc Nation paid off some of his former clients to file bogus lawsuits, while Quinn Emanuel orchestrated the scheme. Buzbee stated that he had, among other things, audio tapes proving his allegation against Roc Nation and Quinn Emanuel, and would provide the tapes as evidence.

=== International expansion and offices ===
The firm's largest office, by number of attorneys, is New York City. Beginning in 2007, Quinn Emanuel expanded internationally by opening its first foreign office in Tokyo. A year later, the firm expanded to London, then Chicago in 2009, Mannheim, Germany in 2010, Moscow in 2011, and Hamburg in 2012. On September 1, 2011, Washington, D.C.'s Legal Times Blog announced that the firm was opening its first office in the nation's capital. In 2013, the firm opened offices in Paris, Munich, Hong Kong, and Sydney, and, in 2014, it opened offices in Brussels and Houston office. LegalWeek reported that Quinn Emanuel opened an office in Seattle in 2015. Other offices of the firm are located in Abu Dhabi, Atlanta, Beijing, Berlin, Dubai, Perth, Riyadh, San Francisco, Silicon Valley, Shanghai, Singapore, Stuttgart and Zürich.

== Notable attorneys ==
- John B. Quinn
- Kathleen Sullivan
- Christopher Landau
- Andrew Schapiro
- Alex Spiro
- Cara Mund

== Notable alumni ==
- Jenny Durkan
- Susan Estrich
- Crystal Nix-Hines

== See also ==
- List of largest law firms by profits per partner
