= Defense Officer Personnel Management Act =

1980 United States federal law

- Acronyms (colloquial): DOPMA
- Enacted by: the 96th United States Congress
- Effective: December 12, 1980

Citations
- Public law: Pub. L. 96–513

Legislative history
- Introduced in the Senate as S. 1918 by Sam Nunn (D–GA) on October 22, 1979; Committee consideration by Senate Armed Services; Passed the Senate on November 30, 1979 (Yeas: 87; Nays: 0); Passed the House on November 17, 1980 (On Suspension); Signed into law by President Jimmy Carter on December 12, 1980

The Defense Officer Personnel Management Act (DOPMA) (Pub. L. 96–513) is a United States federal law passed in 1980 that for the first-time standardized officer personnel management across the United States Armed Forces. It established ceilings on the number of field grade officers authorized to each service, created uniform regulations governing promotions, and codified rules regarding separation and retirement of officers.

The DOPMA created stable and predictable career paths, institutionalized relatively short careers compared to private industry, and mandated the military adopt an "up or out" personnel management strategy (requiring officers who failed selection for promotion to be removed from the service). Although it accomplished many of its intended goals, many provisions and consequences of the legislation remain controversial.

== History ==
=== Interwar years and World War II ===
Prior to World War II, the Army and Navy had different philosophies governing the promotion and retention of officers. The Army maintained a seniority system based on tenure; promotions occurred only if there were vacancies at the next higher grade. Congressionally-imposed limits on the size of the Army officer corps, an extremely low turnover (resignations, retirements, and dismissals), and a "hump" of over-age officers in the middle grades caused by aborted provisions in the National Defense Act of 1920 caused a significant logjam in promotions during the interwar period. In July 1941, Army Chief of Staff General George C. Marshall was given permission by Congress to remove inefficient Regular Army officers from active duty, and used stricter Army regulations to cull the ranks of over-age, medically, or professionally-unfit officers to create more vacancies for junior officers.

During World War II, Army promotions up to lieutenant colonel were decentralized and delegated to commanders in the field. This was in contrast to the Navy, which first introduced an "up or out" system in 1916. The Navy also instituted a centralized selection system, which it maintained even during World War II.

=== OPA and OGLA ===
In the aftermath of World War II, Congress drafted legislation that attempted to address three (sometimes competing) objectives: create "uniform" rules for officer management between Army and Navy (and later Air Force), promote a "young and vigorous" officer corps, and retain the capacity to rapidly remobilize if necessary. In 1947, Congress consolidated Army and Navy officer management legislation into the Officer Personnel Act (OPA). With the encouragement of the Army (notably by General Dwight Eisenhower), the OPA extended the "up or out" system across the military and required officers to go before promotion boards at set times based on cohorts, normally based on year of commissioning. The OPA also ended the practice of appointing Army officers into specific "branches", giving the Army greater authority to move personnel to different functions and change organizational designs. OPA also authorized the services to grant voluntary retirement at 20 years of commissioned service.

The OPA's emphasis on remobilization capacity drastically altered the composition of the armed forces. In 1945, there was approximately one field grade officer for every 208 enlisted personnel; by 1950, there was approximately one field grade officer for every 78 enlisted personnel. In response to that growth, Congress passed the Officer Grade Limitation Act (OGLA) in 1954, which established grade tables for the Army, Marine Corps, Navy, and Air Force, limiting the percentage of officers who could serve in the rank of major (and naval equivalent) and above. The OGLA also limited the number of voluntary retirements of senior officers at the 20-year mark out of concerns that there would be an exodus of officers once they met minimum retirement eligibility criteria. The retirement limitations were later repealed because of the military's assurance to Congress that the majority of career officers would elect to serve until they reached the 30-year mark.

=== Consolidation into DOPMA ===
By the 1970s, Congress desired to consolidate the OPA and the OGLA as well as clarify other legislation governing officer management. The DOPMA, introduced by Senator Sam Nunn, combined many of the provisions of both the OPA and the OGLA. The DOPMA established a "sliding scale" grade table, which authorized a relatively higher number of field grade officers during periods of personnel reductions. That makes promotion opportunities increase significantly during times of growth but decrease more slightly during drawdowns.

== Rules governing promotion ==
The DOPMA "system" generally provides two opportunities to advance to the next rank. Officers typically will go before selection boards in cohorts based on the year they were commissioned. The majority of officers are promoted "in zone" (or in "primary zone"); officers not selected will go before the next board, typically held a year later; officers selected for promotion at this second board are considered to have been promoted "above zone." Officers who are not selected for promotion "above zone" (i.e., who are denied promotion by two consecutive boards) are required to separate from the service; retire if eligible; or, by exception, continue to serve until retirement in their current grade but never again be considered for promotion. At the discretion of the services, a small number of promotions may go to exceptional officers ("below zone") who are promoted one or two years ahead of their cohort.

Congress desired "due course" officers (those selected in the primary zone) to be promoted within set windows based on time served in the current grade and cumulative years of service. While not specified in the DOPMA, Department of Defense policy established targets for selection to the next grade as a percentage from the surviving cohort. Desired promotion rates and reporting requirements of service board results are regularly published by Department of Defense. Current promotion guidelines are as follows:

Promotion to:	Promotion conditions:	Minimum time in previous grade:	Target selection rate:
First lieutenant/Lieutenant (junior grade)/(1LT/1stLt/1st Lt/LTJG)	1.5 to 2 years of service	18 months	All Fully Qualified
Captain/Lieutenant / (CPT/Capt/LT)	3.5 to 4 years of service	2 years	95%
Major/Lieutenant commander / (MAJ/Maj/LCDR)	9 to 11 years of service	3 years	80%
Lieutenant colonel/Commander / (LTC/LtCol/Lt Col/CDR)	15 to 17 years of service	3 years	70%
Colonel/Captain / (COL/Col/CAPT)	21 to 23 years of service	3 years	50%

The DOPMA was designed to apply to "line" officers and made specific exceptions for military lawyers, doctors, nurses, and other professionals. Such officers tend to be managed in significantly different ways, based on custom requirements.

== Consequences of enactment ==
The DOPMA's attempt to balance competing personnel objectives resulted in mixed success. The DOPMA achieved Congressional goals to create uniform promotion outcomes, standardized career lengths across the services, and regulated the number of senior officers as a proportion of the force. It also created reasonable and predictable expectations of when an officer would be eligible for promotion. However, it also had unintended effects. The legislation has been criticized for creating a system that results in high turnover, frequent moves, and relatively short careers. Some of the assumptions underlying DOPMA have proven false. For example, the services' prediction that most career officers would elect a 30-year career was more optimistic than reality. By 1990 the average officer retired after 24 years of service at the age of 46. DOPMA has also proven difficult to implement. Since its inception, the services have repeatedly sought suspension of key provisions of DOPMA grade tables to manage drawdowns and force increases.

Others feel that changing conditions since enactment of the legislation require reform. While the promotion system is predictable, it allows the services little flexibility to reward and manage its top performers. According to author and economist Tim Kane, DOPMA is "the root of all evil in this ecosystem" and binds the military into a system that honors seniority over individual merit. Kane argues that the resultant inflexibility causes tremendous attrition in the officer corps since officers have little control over their careers, but it has persisted despite numerous efforts towards reform. Perhaps the most controversial provision is the "up or out" policy. Even Nunn, the sponsor of the bill, argued that it was needlessly expensive to force officers through the ranks and to rid others unnecessarily. However, the Department of Defense and the House insisted on those provisions being included. Other changes to the DOPMA that have been recommended to Congress include adoption of an "up or stay" personnel policy, greater use of warrant officers, and decreasing the number of officer skills managed in the "line" category.

DOPMA also removed the distinction between Regular and Reserve commission types on active duty. Regular officers no longer had tenure and were subject to future Reduction in Force (RIF) ejections from active duty. However, previously commissioned Regular officers who resigned their commissions before retirement still faced the numerous penalties for resigning: ineligibility to fill any government job for 180 days after leaving the service, requirement to accept an indefinite Reserve commission, etc. Reserve officers on active duty simply requested release from active duty with no penalties.
