= Taproot Foundation =

American nonprofit organization

- Type: 501(c)(3) non-profit organization
- Founded: 2001
- Founder: Aaron Hurst
- Headquarters: San Francisco, U.S.
- Number of locations: New York City, Chicago, San Francisco, and Los Angeles
- Area served: United States, European Union, United Kingdom, Singapore, India
- Services: Nonprofit capacity building, corporate consulting, pro bono volunteering opportunities
- Revenue: 4,505,310 United States dollar (2016)
- Total assets: 5,622,782 United States dollar (2022)
- Number of employees: 36
- Website: www.taprootfoundation.org, www.taprootplus.org

The Taproot Foundation is a U.S.-based non-profit organization that pioneered the concept of skills-based volunteering. It was founded in 2001 by Aaron Hurst to "drive social change by leading, mobilizing, and engaging professionals in pro bono service".

The Foundation operates as a marketplace for expertise, connecting non-profit organizations with business professionals offering pro bono services in critical areas such as marketing, strategy, human resources, and IT. This model aims to build the infrastructure of non-profits, helping them access high-quality professional help they might not otherwise be able to afford. In addition to facilitating individual projects, Taproot provides advisory services to Fortune 500 companies to help them design and implement their own high-impact pro bono programs.
