= Cravath, Swaine & Moore =

American law firm

Cravath, Swaine & Moore LLP
- Headquarters: Two Manhattan West; New York City
- No. of offices: 3
- No. of attorneys: 508
- Major practice areas: General Corporate, M&A, Securities and Banking, Litigation, Tax, Trusts and Estates
- Key people: Faiza Saeed (Presiding Partner)
- Revenue: US$1.2 billion (2024)
- Profit per equity partner: US$6.9 million (2024)
- Date founded: 1819; 207 years ago
- Founders: Richard M. Blatchford; William H. Seward
- Company type: Limited liability partnership
- Website: cravath.com

Cravath, Swaine & Moore LLP (known as Cravath; krə-VATH) is an American white-shoe law firm headquartered in New York City. The firm has additional offices in London and Washington, D.C. It was founded in 1819, and represents American and international industries in litigation, mergers and acquisitions and in antitrust cases. The firm also developed the Cravath System in common use at U.S. law firms for more than a century.

== History ==
Cravath began in 1819 when Richard M. Blatchford opened his law office in New York City, representing American industrialists as well as entities in the United Kingdom and Europe, such as the Bank of England, from 1826 through the 1873 Bank of England forgeries. In 1854, former college classmates Blatchford and William H. Seward (later Abraham Lincoln's Secretary of State) merged their respective law firms, forming Blatchford, Seward & Griswold.

Blatchford served in the New York State Assembly, and as U.S. Minister to the State of the Church. His son, Samuel, later a partner at the firm, served as a federal district court and appeals court judge. Samuel was appointed to the United States Supreme Court in 1882, serving for 11 years until his death; he was the first person to serve at all three levels of the judiciary. Seward was both Governor and Senator from New York, who supported the 1865 passing of the Thirteenth Amendment, and negotiated the 1867 purchase of Alaska from Russia in a transaction that his opponents derisively called "Seward's Folly" and "Seward's Icebox", though since noted as a "bargain basement deal".

Paul Drennan Cravath joined the firm in 1899 and devised the "Cravath System," combining a distinct method of hiring, training, and compensating lawyers. His name was added to the firm name in 1901 and, in 1944, after a series of name changes, the Cravath, Swaine & Moore name was established and has not been altered since.

The Bar of the City of New York was reorganized in 1916 by partners Paul D. Cravath and William D. Guthrie.

From 1950, Cravath managed the first U.S. IPOs of European companies, and continues to represent EU firms into the 21st century. Cravath has remained a relatively small firm of about 500 lawyers, located primarily in its New York office, with a few dozen in its London office, opened in 1973, and in Washington, DC, opened in 2022. The firm opened a Hong Kong office in 1994, closing it nine years later.

In 2015, Cravath was the victim of what the firm described as a "limited breach" of its computer network, which The New York Times connected to a 2016 court case against three Chinese hackers who had made more than $4 million from insider information about merger deals.

In March 2019, the New-York Historical Society Museum & Library debuted an historical installation illustrating the firm's legal milestones across two centuries, including obtaining patents for both the telegraph and the sewing machine, organizing NBC, and securing equal access to locker rooms for women sports reporters. The same year, Fisk University launched Cravath Scholars to assist high-achieving students from the Nashville, Tennessee college with scholarships and pre-law internships in New York. In 2021, the firm donated $3 million to Fisk from the firm's attorneys' fees for United States v. Jefferson County.

== Notable clients and cases ==
Seward's 1808 defense of William Freeman for the murder of John G. Van Nest helped establish the insanity defense. In 1847, Seward & Blatchford challenged the constitutionality of slavery, in Jones v. Van Zandt. From its early years, the firm represented domestic and international banks, industrialists, and American inventors, including Samuel F.B. Morse, in the late 1840s; Cyrus McCormick, Elias Howe, and Charles Goodyear in the 1850s; and George Westinghouse in the 1880s.

At the close of the American Civil War, the firm also represented several U.S. railroads, including New York & Erie and Union Pacific railroads, and express delivery businesses such as Adams, Southern, and Wells Fargo. The firm's mergers and acquisitions (M&A) activity escalated during the late 19th century, commencing long-term associations on Wall Street. In 1895, the landmark Pollock v. Farmers' Loan and Trust Company tax case was won by the firm.

In 1935, the firm represented the A.L.A. Schechter Poultry Corporation in a challenge to the National Industrial Recovery Act. Cravath lawyers secured a unanimous Supreme Court victory. The Supreme Court agreed with the firm that the NIRA codes violated the constitutional separation of powers by impermissibly delegating legislative power.

Some current client relationships began in the 1800s, including with CBS, JPMorgan, and PricewaterhouseCoopers. International clients include Goldman Sachs, Barclays, HM Treasury, Santander and HDFC Bank.

During the 1960s, Cravath lawyers wrote the U.S. Supreme Court brief on behalf of the Congress of Racial Equality’s Freedom rides protesting segregated buses, and were called upon by President John F. Kennedy to help form the Lawyers’ Committee for Civil Rights Under Law. In 1966, the firm helped launch litigation that would become Miranda v. Arizona, which established that states cannot interrogate suspects without informing them of the right to counsel, now implemented as the Miranda warning issued by police to criminal suspects taken into custody.

In 1971, as The Washington Post prepared to publish the Pentagon Papers, Cravath reformed the publisher as a public company that was structured to protect editorial freedom. The firm also defended Time Inc. against Israeli General Ariel Sharon, and CBS against U.S. Army General William Westmoreland in 1984. In 1989, the firm argued before the U.S. Supreme Court on behalf of African American and women firefighters in Birmingham, Alabama. The case was a catalyst for the Civil Rights Act of 1991.

M&A during the late 20th century includes representing DuPont, in its merger with Conoco; Ford, in its acquisition of Jaguar; Bristol-Myers, in its merger with Squibb; and Time Inc., in its merger with Warner, also later advising the merged company in the 2000 AOL-Time-Warner merger, as well as for its later sale to AT&T.

Cases before the Supreme, appellate and Chancery courts across the 20th and 21st centuries include Esquire v. Walker, later Hannegan v. Esquire, Inc., at the U.S. Supreme Court, with Esquire prevailing, in 1946, against the attempted censorship of its magazine by the two Postmasters General; a 13-year landmark antitrust case on behalf of IBM; Netscape's 2003 antitrust suit against Microsoft, which secured a $750 million settlement; Unilever's $3.7 billion acquisition of Alberto-Culver; Kiobel v. Royal Dutch Petroleum Co., in which Cravath defended Royal Dutch against charges of human rights abuses including forced exile, extrajudicial killing, crimes against humanity, and torture or cruel, inhuman, and degrading treatment. Westfed Holdings Inc. v. United States, a challenge against the federal government's passage and imposition of the Financial Institutions Reform, Recovery and Enforcement Act ("FIRREA"); Ohio v. American Express, which successfully preserved an American Express "anti-steering" practice that prevented merchants from promoting credit cards with lower transaction fees and informing customers of different credit cards; and United States v. Jefferson County, an employment discrimination case in Alabama police and fire departments.

In November 2014, Cravath acted as legal advisor in a deal backed by 3G Capital and Berkshire Hathaway Inc. that would create the third-largest food and beverage company in North America. In 2018, the firm advised Disney in its acquisition of 21st Century Fox. It litigated for Epic Games in Epic Games v. Apple, and for its subsequent challenge to Apple's compliance plan.

During the 2020s, Cravath represented Illumina in its $7 billion acquisition of Grail, defeating antitrust challenges from the FTC and the European Commission, then for Illumina's 2023 spin off of the biotechnology subsidiary. The firm represented The Williams Companies at trial and as appellate court counsel, securing judgments of over $600 million in M&A litigation against Energy Transfer for a failed merger. The firm represented the special committee of the board of directors of Paramount Global in its merger with Skydance Media, to form Paramount Skydance Corporation on August 7, 2025.

== Rankings ==
Cravath has ranked as the #1 law firm in the United States in the annual "Vault Law 100", for 2017 through 2026, and either first or second annually, since 2007. The firm ranked 49th in The American Lawyer's "Am Law 200" in 2025, which lists the firm by revenue and profits per lawyer, compensation and other criteria.

== Hiring ==
Under its Cravath System, developed in the early 20th century, the firm is known for focusing its hiring of associates on new law school graduates, with a strong emphasis on grades, then immersing them in corporate law practice over years of apprenticeship rotations. Lateral hires were rare under the Cravath System, prior to 2020. In 2005, the firm hired Andrew W. Needham, formerly a tax partner at Willkie Farr & Gallagher, as the first lateral partner since Herbert L. Camp, also a tax partner, from the now-defunct Donovan Leisure Newton & Irvine, in 1987. Camp, however, had previously been a Cravath associate and may therefore be considered to not be a true lateral hire because he started his career there. Before that, Roswell Magill, a former Treasury Department official, became a Cravath tax partner in 1943. In 2007, the firm brought in Richard Levin from Skadden, Arps to boost its new bankruptcy practice. In 2011, Cravath hired Christine A. Varney, a former U.S. Assistant Attorney General for the Antitrust Division for the Obama Administration, which Public Citizen later criticized as a revolving door case when Varney represented AT&T in its acquisition of Time Warner. In 2013, the firm hired David Kappos, who served as the Under Secretary of Commerce for Intellectual Property and Director of the United States Patent and Trademark Office.

On November 1, 2023, during the Gaza war protests at universities, Cravath was among more than two dozen law firms that submitted a letter to 14 American law school deans, denouncing anti-Semitism, Islamophobia, and racism, and advising those mentoring future law graduates of entrenched workplace policies against harassment or discrimination at their firms. Previously, the firm was also among 17 global law firm signatories to a public statement denouncing growing antisemitic attacks in the U.S. that was published in The American Lawyer on May 27, 2021.

== See also ==
- List of Cravath, Swaine & Moore employees
- List of largest law firms by profits per partner
- List of largest law firms by revenue
