= Anton-Hermann Chroust =

German-American jurist, philosopher and historian

- Born: 29 January 1907
- Died: January 1982 (aged 74–75)
- Occupations: professor of law, philosophy, and history

Anton-Hermann Chroust (29 January 1907 in Würzburg, Germany – 11 January 1982 in South Bend, Indiana) was a German-American jurist, philosopher and historian, from 1946 to 1972, professor of law, philosophy, and history, at the University of Notre Dame. Chroust was best known for his 1965 book The Rise of the Legal Profession in America.

== Life ==
Chroust was born on 29 January 1907 in Würzburg, Germany, the son of Johanna and Anton Julius Chroust. His father was an Austrian-born professor of German history at the University of Würzburg.

Anton-Hermann Chroust earned a bachelor's degree from the University of Würzburg in 1925, a law degree from the University of Erlangen in 1929, and a doctorate from the Ludwig-Maximilians-Universität München in 1931 .

He arrived in the United States in September 1932 to study for an advanced law degree at Harvard Law School. Chroust finished his academic work at Harvard in 1933, earning a doctorate in juridical science, Harvard's most advanced law degree. Although not on the Harvard payroll, Chroust then served as a special assistant to Harvard Law Dean Nathan Roscoe Pound until 1941, while at the same time applying for academic positions at universities across the United States.

On December 9, 1941—two days after the Japanese bombed Pearl Harbor—FBI agents arrived at Chroust's rooming house in Boston and took him into custody as an enemy alien who was suspected of sympathy with the Nazi Party and possibly working for Nazi Germany. The federal government case listed at least fourteen informants, including members of the Harvard faculty. Chroust was strongly defended by his friend, Harvard Law School dean Roscoe Pound.

German records identify Chroust as a member of the Nazi Party as late as July 15, 1939. In March 1943, Chroust was released on parole with Pound designated as his parole sponsor. In 1945 Chroust was again detained by the U.S. authorities, was released on parole on February 23, 1946, but faced possible deportation.

Chroust joined faculty of the University of Notre Dame in the summer of 1946 after being recommended by Pound. He was a visiting professor at Yale Law School in 1961-1962 where he worked on the history of the legal profession.

On March 29, 1941, Chroust married Elisabeth Redmond of Brookline, Massachusetts. The couple separated in 1946 and divorced in 1950.

Chroust became a naturalized U.S. citizen on February 7, 1951, at a ceremony in South Bend, with Pound serving as his sponsor.

Chroust retired from the full-time faculty at Notre Dame in 1972 and died on January 11, 1982, in South Bend, Indiana. He is buried at Cedar Grove Cemetery at the University of Notre Dame.

== Notable works ==
- The Corporate Idea and the Body Politic in the Middle Ages (1947)
- Socrates, Man and Myth: The Two Socratic apologies of Xenophon (1957)
- Protrepticus: A Reconstruction (1964)
- The Rise of the Legal Profession in America (1965)
- Aristotle: New Light on His Life and on Some of His Lost Works (1973)
- Aristotle: Some Novel Interpretations of the Man and His Life (1973)

== Bibliography ==
See also Legal profession#Further reading for his numerous articles on the history of the legal profession in Europe and the United States.

1942

- Chroust, Anton-Hermann (1942). "Aristotle's Conception of Equity (Epieikeia)". Notre Dame Law Review. 18 (2): 119–128.
- Chroust, Anton-Hermann (1942). "About a Fourth Formula of the Categorical Imperative in Kant". The Philosophical Review. 51 (6): 600–605. doi:10.2307/2180944. ISSN 0031-8108. JSTOR 2180944.

1944

- Chroust, Anton-Hermann (1944). "The Philosophy of Law of St. Augustine". The Philosophical Review. 53 (2): 195–202. doi:10.2307/2182025. ISSN 0031-8108. JSTOR 2182025.
- Chroust, Anton-Hermann (1944). "The Philosophy of Law of Gustav Radbruch". The Philosophical Review. 53 (1): 23–45. doi:10.2307/2181218. ISSN 0031-8108. JSTOR 2181218.

1945

- Chroust, Anton-Hermann (1945). "The Metaphysics of Time and History in Early Christian Thought". The New Scholasticism. 19 (4): 322–352. doi:10.5840/newscholas194519441. ISSN 0028-6621.
- Chroust, Anton-Hermann (1945). "Socrates -- A Source Problem". The New Scholasticism. 19 (1): 48–72. doi:10.5840/newscholas19451912. ISSN 0028-6621.
- Chroust, Anton-Hermann (1945). "Law and the Administrative Process: An Epistemological Approach to Jurisprudence". Harvard Law Review. 58 (4): 573–588. doi:10.2307/1335697. ISSN 0017-811X. JSTOR 1335697.
- Chroust, Anton-Hermann (1945). "A Contribution to the Medieval Discussion: Utrum Aristoteles Sit Salvatus". Journal of the History of Ideas. 6 (2): 231–238. doi:10.2307/2707365. ISSN 0022-5037. JSTOR 2707365.

1946

- Chroust, Anton-Hermann (1946). "The Function of Law and Justice in the Ancient World and the Middle Ages". Journal of the History of Ideas. 7 (3): 298–320. doi:10.2307/2707403. ISSN 0022-5037. JSTOR 2707403.

1947

- Chroust, Anton-Hermann (1947). "Philosophy: Its Essence and Meaning in the Ancient World". The Philosophical Review. 56 (1): 19–58. doi:10.2307/2182056. ISSN 0031-8108. JSTOR 2182056.
- Chroust, Anton-Hermann (1947). "Christianity and the Concept of Private Property". The Review of Politics. 9 (3): 383–386. doi:10.1017/S0034670500038754. ISSN 0034-6705. S2CID 251375193.
- Chroust, Anton-Hermann (1947). "The Corporate Idea and the Body Politic in the Middle Ages". The Review of Politics. 9 (4): 423–452. doi:10.1017/S0034670500039486. ISSN 0034-6705. S2CID 145315554.
- Chroust, Anton-Hermann (1947). "The Problem of Plato's Parmenides". The New Scholasticism. 21 (4): 371–418. doi:10.5840/newscholas194721427. ISSN 0028-6621.
- Chroust, Anton-Hermann (1947). "The Meaning of Time in the Ancient World". The New Scholasticism. 21 (1): 1–70. doi:10.5840/newscholas19472111. ISSN 0028-6621.

1948

- Chroust, Anton-Hermann (1948). "On the Bases of Ethics". The Review of Politics. 10 (4): 517–519. doi:10.1017/S0034670500047689. ISSN 0034-6705. S2CID 145616492.
- Chroust, Anton-Hermann (1948). "A Self-Critique of Philosophy". The Review of Politics. 10 (2): 259–260. doi:10.1017/S003467050004239X. ISSN 0034-6705. S2CID 170895079.

1949

- Chroust, Anton-Hermann (1949). "Foundations of German Philosophy". The Review of Politics. 11 (1): 120–122. doi:10.1017/S0034670500044788. ISSN 0034-6705. S2CID 146193806.
- Chroust, Anton-Hermann; Corbett, James A (1949). "The Fifteenth Century Review of Politics of Laurentius of Arezzo". Mediaeval Studies. 11: 62–76. doi:10.1484/J.MS.2.305893. ISSN 0076-5872.

1950

- Chroust, Anton-Hermann (1950). St. Augustine's philosophical theory of law. Notre Dame, Ind.: Notre Dame Law School.
- Chroust, Anton-Hermann (1950). "Legal-Political Theory". The Review of Politics. 12 (1): 122–127. doi:10.1017/S0034670500045769. ISSN 0034-6705. S2CID 144660135.
- Chroust, Anton-Hermann (1950). "The Meaning of Some Quotations From St. Augustine in the Summa Theologica of St. Thomas". The Modern Schoolman. 27 (4): 280–296. doi:10.5840/schoolman195027444. ISSN 0026-8402.

1951

- Chroust, Anton-Hermann (1951). "Toward a More Practical Natural Law". The Review of Politics. 13 (3): 394–395. doi:10.1017/S0034670500047343. ISSN 0034-6705. S2CID 145755436.
- Chroust, Anton-Hermann (1951). "The Definitions of Philosophy in the De Divisione Philosophiae of Dominicus Gundissalinus". The New Scholasticism. 25 (3): 253–281. doi:10.5840/newscholas195125328. ISSN 0028-6621.

1952

- Chroust, Anton-Hermann (1952). "Book Review: The Nature of Law". Speculum. 27 (2): 209–212. doi:10.2307/2854501. ISSN 0038-7134. JSTOR 2854501.
- Chroust, Anton-Hermann (1952). "The Nature of Law. Thomas E. Davitt". Speculum. 27 (2): 209–212. doi:10.2307/2854501. ISSN 0038-7134. JSTOR 2854501.
- Chroust, Anton-Hermann (1952). "Socrates and Pre-Socratic Philosophy". The Modern Schoolman. 29 (2): 119–135. doi:10.5840/schoolman195229236. ISSN 0026-8402.

1953

- Chroust, Anton Hermann (1953). "Freedom through Law". The Review of Politics. 15 (4): 538–541. doi:10.1017/S0034670500001984. ISSN 0034-6705. S2CID 145011638.

1954

- Chroust, Anton-Hermann (1954). "Treason and Patriotism in Ancient Greece". Journal of the History of Ideas. 15 (2): 280–288. doi:10.2307/2707772. ISSN 0022-5037. JSTOR 2707772.
- Chroust, Anton-Hermann (1954). "The Composition of Aristotle's Metaphysics". The New Scholasticism. 28 (1): 58–100. doi:10.5840/newscholas19542813. ISSN 0028-6621.

1957

- Chroust, Anton-Hermann (1957). Socrates, man and myth: the two Socratic apologies of Xenophon. Notre Dame, Ind.: University of Notre Dame.
- Chroust, Anton-Hermann (1957). "The Meaning of Lawn in a Modern Democratic Society". Archiv für Rechts- und Sozialphilosophie. 43 (3): 321–341. ISSN 0177-1094.
- Chroust, Anton-Hermann (1957). "The Natural Law Forum". Archiv für Rechts- und Sozialphilosophie. 43 (2): 235–237. ISSN 0177-1094.

1958

- Chroust, Anton-Hermann (1958). "Greek Law and Legal Theory". The Review of Politics. 20 (4): 675–680. doi:10.1017/S003467050003432X. ISSN 0034-6705. S2CID 146156662.

1960

- Chroust, Anton-Hermann (1960). "Did President Jackson Actually Threaten the Supreme Court of the United States with Nonenforcement of Its Injunction against the State of Georgia?". The American Journal of Legal History. 4 (1): 76–78. doi:10.2307/844553. ISSN 0002-9319. JSTOR 844553.
- Chroust, Anton-Hermann (1960). "Who is the Platonic Philosopher King?". The New Scholasticism. 34 (4): 499–505. doi:10.5840/newscholas196034467. ISSN 0028-6621.

1961

- Chroust, Anton-Hermann (1961). "The Origin of "Metaphysics"". The Review of Metaphysics. 14 (4): 601–616. ISSN 0034-6632.
- Chroust, Anton-Hermann (1961). "Charges of Philosophical Plagiarism in Greek Antiquity". The Modern Schoolman. 38 (3): 219–237. doi:10.5840/schoolman196138326. ISSN 0026-8402.
- Chroust, Anton-Hermann (1961). "Abraham Lincoln Argues a Pro-Slavery Case". The American Journal of Legal History. 5 (4): 299–308. doi:10.2307/844031. ISSN 0002-9319. JSTOR 844031.

1962

- Chroust, Anton-Hermann (1962). "A Second (And Closer) Look at Plato's Political Philosophy". Archiv für Rechts- und Sozialphilosophie. 48: 449–486. ISSN 0177-1094.
- Chroust, Anton-Hermann (1962). "The Lawyers of New Jersey and the Stamp Act". The American Journal of Legal History. 6 (3): 286–297. doi:10.2307/844074. ISSN 0002-9319. JSTOR 844074.

1963

- Chroust, Anton-Hermann (1963). "Law: Reason, Legalism, and the Judicial Process". Ethics. 74 (1): 1–18. doi:10.1086/291468. ISSN 0014-1704. S2CID 143998338.

1964

- Chroust, Anton-Hermann (1964). Aristotle: Protrepticus : a reconstruction. Notre Dame, Ind.: University of Notre Dame Press.
- Aristotle; Chroust, Anton-Hermann (1964). Protrepticus a reconstruction. Notre Dame, Ind.: University of Notre Dame Press.
- Chroust, Anton-Hermann (1964). "Aristotle's Earliest "Course of Lectures on Rhetoric"". L'Antiquité Classique. 33 (1): 58–72. doi:10.3406/antiq.1964.1399. ISSN 0770-2817.
- Chroust, Anton-Hermann (1964). "Brevia Aristotelica". The Modern Schoolman. 41 (2): 165–167. doi:10.5840/schoolman196441228. ISSN 0026-8402.
- Chroust, Anton-Hermann (1964). "Some Reflections on the Origin of the Term "Philosopher"". The New Scholasticism. 38 (4): 423–434. doi:10.5840/newscholas19643841. ISSN 0028-6621.

1965

- Chroust, Anton-Hermann (1965). "A Brief Account of the Reconstruction of Aristotle's Protrepticus". Classical Philology. 60 (4): 229–239. doi:10.1086/365046. ISSN 0009-837X. S2CID 161905149.
- Chroust, Anton-Hermann (1965). The Rise of the Legal Profession in America: Vol 1 The colonial experience. Norman: University of Oklahoma Press.
- Chroust, Anton-Hermann (1965). The Rise of the Legal Profession in America: Vol 2 The revolution and the post-revolutionary era. Norman: University of Oklahoma Press.
- Chroust, Anton-Hermann (1965). "Book Review: La filosofia del primo Aristotele". The American Journal of Philology. 86 (3): 291–296. doi:10.2307/293538. ISSN 0002-9475. JSTOR 293538.
- Chroust, Anton-Hermann (1965). "Aristotle's Politicus: A Lost Dialogue". Rheinisches Museum für Philologie. 108 (4): 346–353. ISSN 0035-449X.
- Chroust, Anton-Hermann (1965). "A Brief Analysis of the "Vita Aristotelis" of Diogenes Laertius (DL, V, 1-16)". L'Antiquité Classique. 34 (1): 97–129. doi:10.3406/antiq.1965.1432. ISSN 0770-2817.
- Chroust, Anton-Hermann (1965). "The Ideal Polity of the Early Stoics: Zeno's "Republic"". The Review of Politics. 27 (2): 173–183. doi:10.1017/S0034670500006896. ISSN 0034-6705. S2CID 145451284.
- Chroust, Anton-Hermann (1965). "Aristotle and the "Philosophies of the East"". The Review of Metaphysics. 18 (3): 572–580. ISSN 0034-6632.
- Chroust, Anton-Hermann; Parent, Alphonse-Marie; Trépanier, Emmanuel (1965). "Some Comments on Aristotle's Major Works on Ethics". Laval Théologique et Philosophique. 21 (1): 63–79. doi:10.7202/1020070ar. ISSN 0023-9054.

1966

- Chroust, Anton-Hermann (1966). "Eudemus or On the Soul: a Lost Dialogue of Aristotle On the Immortality of the Soul". Mnemosyne. 19 (1): 17–30. doi:10.1163/156852566X00943. ISSN 0026-7074.
- Chroust, Anton-Hermann (1966). "The Hellenistic and Roman Age". The New Scholasticism. 40 (2): 257–261. doi:10.5840/newscholas196640234. ISSN 0028-6621.
- Chroust, Anton Hermann (1966). "A Cosmological Proof for the Existence of God in Aristotle's Lost Dialogue, On Philosophy". The New Scholasticism. 40 (4): 447–463. doi:10.5840/newscholas19664044. ISSN 0028-6621.
- Chroust, Anton-Hermann (1966). "What Prompted Aristotle to Address the Protrepticus to Themison?". Hermes. 94 (2): 202–207. ISSN 0018-0777.
- Chroust, Anton-Hermann (1966). "Aristotle's Flight from Athens in the Year 323 B.C.". Historia: Zeitschrift für Alte Geschichte. 15 (2): 185–192. ISSN 0018-2311.

1967

- Chroust, Anton-Hermann (1967). "The Myth of Aristotle's Suicide". The Modern Schoolman. 44 (2): 177–178. doi:10.5840/schoolman196744222. ISSN 0026-8402.
- Chroust, Anton-Hermann; Parent, Alphonse-Marie; Trépanier, Emmanuel (1967). "Aristotle Returns to Athens in the Year 335 B.C." Laval Théologique et Philosophique. 23 (2): 244–254. doi:10.7202/1020112ar. ISSN 0023-9054.
- Chroust, Anton-Hermann (1967). "Plato's Academy: The First Organized School of Political Science in Antiquity". The Review of Politics. 29 (1): 25–40. doi:10.1017/S0034670500023718. ISSN 0034-6705. S2CID 145474527.
- Chroust, Anton-Hermann (1967). "Aristotle Leaves the Academy". Greece and Rome. 14 (1): 39–43. doi:10.1017/S001738350001651X. ISSN 0017-3835. S2CID 171011055.

1968

- Chroust, Anton-Hermann (1968). "Aristotle's Criticism of Plato's "Philosopher King"". Rheinisches Museum für Philologie. 111 (1): 16–22. ISSN 0035-449X.
- Chroust, Anton-Hermann (1968). "The Doctrine of the Soul in Aristotle's Lost Dialogue "On Philosophy"". The New Scholasticism. 42 (3): 364–373. doi:10.5840/newscholas196842332. ISSN 0028-6621.
- Chroust, Anton‐Hermann (1968). "Werner Jaeger and the reconstruction of Aristotle's lost works". Symbolae Osloenses. 42 (1): 7–43. doi:10.1080/00397676808590590. ISSN 0039-7679.

1972

- CHROUST, Anton-Hermann (1972). ""Mystical Revelation" and "Rational Theology" in Aristotle's "On Philosophy"". Tijdschrift voor Filosofie. 34 (3): 500–512. ISSN 1370-575X.
- Chroust, Anton-Hermann (1972). "Comments on Aristotle's "On Prayer"". The New Scholasticism. 46 (3): 308–330. doi:10.5840/newscholas197246318. ISSN 0028-6621.
- Chroust, Anton-Hermann (1972). "Aristotle and the Foreign Policy of Macedonia". The Review of Politics. 34 (3): 367–394. doi:10.1017/S0034670500026127. ISSN 0034-6705. S2CID 143758451.
- Chroust, Anton-Hermann (1972). "Aristotle's Sojourn in Assos". Historia: Zeitschrift für Alte Geschichte. 21 (2): 170–176. ISSN 0018-2311.

1973

- Chroust, Anton Hermann (1973). Some novel interpretations of the man and his life. Notre Dame, Ind: University of Notre Dame Press.
- Chroust, Anton-Hermann (1973). Aristotle: new light on his life and on some of his lost works. Vol. 1. London: Routledge & Kegan Paul. ISBN 978-0-7100-7582-6.
- Chroust, Anton-Hermann (1973). Aristotle: new light on his life and on some of his lost works. Vol. 2. London: Routledge & Kegan Paul. ISBN 978-0-7100-7722-6.
- Chroust, Anton-Hermann (1973). "The "Great Deluge" in Aristotle's on Philosophy". L'Antiquité Classique. 42 (1): 113–122. doi:10.3406/antiq.1973.1695. ISSN 0770-2817.
- Chroust, Anton-Hermann (1973). "Who Is Al-Kindi's "Greek King" (Frag. 11, Ross) of Aristotle's "Eudemis"?". The Modern Schoolman. 50 (4): 379–381. doi:10.5840/schoolman197350443. ISSN 0026-8402.
- Chroust, Anton-Hermann (1973). "Athens Bestows the Decree of Proxenia on Aristotle". Hermes Hermes. 101 (2): 187–194. ISSN 0018-0777.

1974

- Chroust, Anton-Hermann (1974). "Pseudo-Ocellus De universi natura 3. 4. 41 (Harder): A Fragment of Aristotle's On Philosophy?". Classical Philology. 69 (3): 209–210. doi:10.1086/366087. ISSN 0009-837X. S2CID 170691087.

1975

- Chroust, Anton-Hermann (1975). "Aetius, "De Placitis," I. 7. 7–9". The New Scholasticism. 49 (2): 211–218. doi:10.5840/newscholas197549238. ISSN 0028-6621.
- Chroust, Anton-Hermann (1975). "A Tentative Outline for a Possible Reconstruction of Aristotle's Lost Dialogue on Philosophy". L'Antiquité Classique. 44 (2): 553–569. doi:10.3406/antiq.1975.1788. ISSN 0770-2817.
- Chroust, Anton-Hermann; Langevin, Paul-Émile; Trépanier, Emmanuel; Trépanier, Emmanuel (1975). "Some Comments on Philo of Alexandria: De Aeternitate Mundi". Laval Théologique et Philosophique. 31 (2): 135–145. doi:10.7202/1020477ar. ISSN 0023-9054.

1977

- Chroust, Anton-Hermann (1977). "Aristotle' "Metaphysics" 981 b 13-25: A Fragment of the Aristotelian "On Philosophy"". Rheinisches Museum für Philologie. 120 (3/4): 241–246. ISSN 0035-449X.

1978

- Chroust, Anton-Hermann (1978). "Aristotle's Doctrine of the Uncreatedness and Indestructibility of the Universe". The New Scholasticism. 52 (2): 268–279. doi:10.5840/newscholas19785228. ISSN 0028-6621.

1979

- Chroust, Anton-Hermann (1979). "On Masters's "The Case of Aristotle's Missing Dialogues"". Political Theory. 7 (4): 537–543. doi:10.1177/009059177900700409. ISSN 0090-5917. S2CID 144956353.

1980

- Chroust, Anton-Hermann (1980). "The Influence of Zoroastrian Teachings on Plato, Aristotle, and Greek Philosophy in General". The New Scholasticism. 54 (3): 342–357. doi:10.5840/newscholas198054313. ISSN 0028-6621.

2008

- Chroust, Anton‐Hermann (2008). "Lucretius, De Rerum Natura II. 1024–1042". Symbolae Osloenses. 51 (1): 95–103. doi:10.1080/00397677608590688. ISSN 0039-7679.

2011

- Chroust, Anton Hermann (2011). The fundamental ideas in St. Augustine's philosophy of law. Ashgate. ISBN 978-0-7546-2894-1.
