= Jerold Auerbach =

American historian (born 1936)

Jerold Auerbach (born 1936) is an American historian and professor emeritus of history at Wellesley College. His work principally addresses the modern history of the legal profession, Native Americans, and Israel and the Jewish people.

Auerbach earned his B.A. at Oberlin College and a Ph.D. at Columbia University in 1965. He taught at Queens College and at Brandeis University before joining the Wellesley faculty in 1971.

Writing in the Harvard Law Review, Judge Charles Edward Wyzanski, Jr., described Auerbach's Unequal Justice (1976) as having, "a cogency built on careful scholarship not impaired by fanaticism." Not all reviews were as complimentary. Yale Law School professor Joseph W. Bishop, writing in Commentary, accused Auerbach of having "marred his argument by suggestion of the false, suppression of the true, distortion of his adversaries' arguments, and the frequent use of half-truth and sometimes simple untruth". A New York Times book review by Harvard law professor Alan Dershowitz was more favorable.

== Books ==
- Print to Fit: The New York Times, Zionism and Israel (1896-2016) (Academic Studies Press, 2019) ISBN 9781618118974
- Against the Grain: A Historian's Journey (Quid Pro Books, 2012) ISBN 9781610271332
- Brothers at War: Israel and the Tragedy of the Altalena (Quid Pro Books, 2011) ISBN 9781610270618
- Hebron Jews: Memory and Conflict in the Land of Israel (Rowman & Littlefield, 2009)
- Explorers in Eden: Pueblo Indians and the Promised Land (New Mexico, 2006) ISBN 9780826339461
- Are We One? Jewish Identity in the United States and Israel (Rutgers, 2001) ISBN 9780813529172
- Jacob's Voices: Reflections of a Wandering American Jew (Southern Illinois, 1996) ISBN 9780809320554
- Rabbis and Lawyers: The Journey from Torah to Constitution (Indiana, 1990) ISBN 9781610270243
- Justice Without Law? (Oxford, 1983)
- Unequal Justice: Lawyers and Social Change in Modern America. (Oxford, 1976)
- Labor and Liberty (Bobbs-Merrill, 1969)
