= History of the American legal profession =

The history of the American legal profession covers the work, training, and professional activities of lawyers from the colonial era to the present. Lawyers grew increasingly powerful in the colonial era as experts in the English common law, which was adopted by the colonies. By the 21st century, over one million practitioners in the United States held law degrees, and many others served the legal system as justices of the peace, paralegals, marshals, and other aides.

== Colonial era ==
From their inception, the American colonies followed the English common law tradition. Legal procedures in the 17th century were quite informal, with judges discussing issues directly with the people involved in the case. Citizens generally represented themselves, which resulted in benefits to some and disadvantages to others. The solution was to hire a professional lawyer. By 1700, both judges and judicial procedures had become much more formal; to win a case, a client needed a lawyer to handle the arguments, cite the precedents, and neutralize the opposing counsel. While England still kept an elaborate hierarchy of judges, barristers and solicitors with formal qualifications, colonial lawyers were '"Jacks of all trades" who learned their skills by apprenticeship and by closely watching court procedures. Colonial legislatures passed laws to fix the fees lawyers could charge for standardized procedures and maintain these fees relatively low. This often led some lawyers to handle a high volume of cases more speedily. Provincial courts usually made a circuit between the different counties, spending a few days in each county seat. Each attorney might handle thirty to forty cases in three or four days. The great majority of cases dealt with debts, which were quickly handled. Occasionally, there were land disputes, which were much more complicated and time-consuming because they required searches in legal titles, which were poorly indexed. This set them apart from the merchants, planters, and farmers who depended on seasonal sales or long-term trading voyages. Lawyers in Maryland accumulated large private libraries and chambers where they discussed legal matters with clients and trained their understudies. By becoming familiar with the intimate economic details of the counties, lawyers could take advantage of bargains. The close-knit nature of the profession also allowed them to build up their wealth, connections, and political base. They were highly flexible and had the time and opportunity to hold local offices in the public service, most of which paid poorly, but some of which were quite generous. Decade by decade, lawyers emerged as one of the highest income groups, with a wide range of contacts.

In New York City during colonial times, legal practitioners were full-time businessmen and merchants with no legal training. Instead, they would watch court proceedings and piece them together with snippets of English law. Court proceedings were informal, for the judges had no more training than the attorneys. By the 1760s, the situation had dramatically changed. Lawyers were essential to the rapidly growing international trade, dealing with questions of partnerships, contracts, and insurance. The sums of money involved were large, and hiring an incompetent lawyer was a very expensive proposition. Lawyers were now professionally trained, and conversant in an extremely complex language that combined highly specific legal terms and motions with a dose of Latin. Court proceedings became a baffling to ordinary laymen. Lawyers became more specialized and built their fee schedule on the basis of their reputation for success. As their status, wealth, and power rose, animosity followed.

Professional lawyers were not widely loved in the colonies. Families would often share stories of being deceived or cheated by devious attorneys. Roscoe Pound flatly says, "Lawyers as a class were very unpopular in the colonies." Lawyers thus tried to raise their professional standards by forming local bar associations, but had little success in the colonial era. Full professionalization would not become standardized until after the Civil War.

=== Lawyers and politics ===
The British governors were upper class aristocrats appointed into their positions not trained in the law and felt unduly constrained by the legalistic demands of U.S. lawyers. From the 1680s to 1715, numerous efforts were made to strengthen Royal control and diminish legal constraints over the power of the governors. Colonial lawyers successfully resisted. An important technique that developed in Boston, Philadelphia, and New York in the 1720s and 1730s was to mobilize public opinion by using the new availability of weekly newspapers and print shops that produced inexpensive pamphlets. Lawyers would use this publicity to disseminate ideas about legal rights in the U.S. as Englishmen. By the 1750s and 1760s, however, there was a counter-attack ridiculing and demeaning the lawyers as pettifoggers. Their image and influence declined as a consequence. The lawyers of colonial New York organized a bar association, but it fell apart in 1768 during the bitter political dispute between factions from the Delancey and Livingston families. Over the next century, there were various unsuccessful attempts in New York to build an effective organization of lawyers. Finally, a Bar Association emerged in 1869 that proved successful and continues to operate.

The United States Revolution saw the departure of many leading lawyers, and the arrival in high offices of even younger lawyers. In most of the 13 colonies, a prominent faction of the legal profession were Loyalists, as their clients were often tied to royal authority or British merchants and financiers. After the revolution, they were not allowed to practice law unless they took a loyalty oath to the new United States of America. Many went to Britain or Canada after losing the war. Nevertheless, the lawyers who remained had a major impact on shaping the new nation. Lawyers comprised 45 percent of the fifty-six signers of the Declaration of Independence, 69 percent of the forty-five members of the Constitutional Convention, and 40 percent of the twenty-five senators in the new Congress that opened in 1789, as well as 26 percent of the sixty-five representatives.

== Becoming a lawyer ==
In the 18th and 19th centuries, most young people became lawyers by apprenticing in the office of an established lawyer, where they would engage in clerical duties such as drawing up routine contracts and wills, while studying standard treatises; this became known as reading law. The apprentice would then have to be admitted to the local court in order to practice law. Frank B. Kellogg (1856-1937) is an unusually successful example of this route. Starting as a farm boy in Minnesota who dropped out of the local one-room school at age 14, he never attended high school, college, or law school. He clerked for a lawyer who specialized in corporate law, and soon proved himself adept. He played a major role as special assistant to the U.S. Attorney General in one of the most famous decisions in corporate legal history, in which the Supreme Court broke up Standard Oil Corporation in 1911. His professional colleagues elected Kellogg president of the American Bar Association in 1912. After one term in the United States Senate, he became a diplomat as ambassador to Great Britain and as Secretary of State in 1925–29. He co-authored the world-famous Kellogg–Briand Pact of 1928, for which he shared the Nobel Peace Prize. The pact was signed by nearly all nations recognized at the time. It outlawed making war, and provided the legal foundation for the trial and execution of German and Japanese war criminals at the end of World War II.

While apprenticing, apprentices would read legal texts. Sometimes they would study on their own by reading legal texts without an apprenticeship.

The apprenticeship system favored nepotism, as friends and relatives of lawyers tried to place theirs offspring in these positions. An alternative more broadly open to the middle class was to attend academic law schools. The College of William and Mary set up the first chair in law in 1779, 21 years after the first such chair was established in England. The first independent law school was the Litchfield Law School, founded in 1782 in Connecticut by Tapping Reeve. Between 1784 and its closure in 1833, it trained over 1000 young lawyers, many of whom became leaders of the bar at the state level, or politicians at the state and national level. Alumni included two vice presidents (Aaron Burr and John C Calhoun), as well as 101 members of the United States House of Representatives, 28 United States senators, six cabinet secretaries, three justices of the United States Supreme Court, 14 state governors and 13 state supreme court chief justices. By the 1860s, academic law schools tied to universities were increasingly popular, as typified by the University of Pennsylvania, which opened its law department in 1850. ~~↵~~By the middle of the 19th century, there were over a hundred law schools in the country, most of them very small institutions run as a sideline operation.

The most famous academic training program was the Harvard Law School, founded in 1817 as part of the University. Supreme Court Justice Joseph Story was for decades its highly influential senior professor. Story's many compilations and law books established a national curriculum for local law schools. Even more influential was Christopher Columbus Langdell, Harvard Law dean from 1870 to 1895. Instead of the usual practice of daily lectures, Langdell introduced the case system. Professors called on students to explain the legal reasoning behind specific cases, teaching them to reason like judges. This case method spread rapidly to all law schools. By the 20th century, many local bar associations required graduation from an accredited law school before a candidate could take the bar exam and begin practice. Small operations could not afford the necessary libraries and faculties, so they steadily disappeared.

Local bar associations before 1870 were basically social groups, which took little or no responsibility for maintaining the quality of admissions or performance by the membership. In 1870, leading lawyers in Manhattan organized the "Association of the Bar of the City of New York" to battle the notorious political corruption of the Tweed machine. The bar quickly emerged as a powerful organization and a model to others; in the 1870s, eight cities and eight statewide associations were in operation. By 1890, there were 20 state bar associations, 40 by 1900, and 48 by 1916. By 1890, the number had increased to 159 bar at the local level, and over 1,100 by 1930. They still performed social functions, but were increasingly called upon to organize, discipline, and professionalize lawyers, while fighting off the long-standing hostility and ridicule prevalent toward the legal profession. An important priority for the states and for the national American Bar Association was to maintain control over state bar examinations and over requirements for law schools, such as academic curriculum, library facilities, and availability of full-time faculty.

== California Gold Rush ==
The sudden acquisition of California in 1848 followed by the California Gold Rush caused a hurried transition to California statehood in 1850. Legal conditions were chaotic at first. The new state lacked judicial precedents, prisons, competent lawyers, and a coherent as system of laws. Lawyers arrived from many different states and jurisdictions, with little legal experience. Alarmed citizens formed vigilante tribunals, most famoulsy in the San Francisco Committee of Vigilance in the 1850s. Absent an established system of law and order, they diespensed raw justice quickly through drum-head trials, whipping, banishment, or hanging. As a body of law developed, the courts set precedents on such issues as women's contractual rights, real estate and mortgages, tort law, and review of flawed statutes. An elaborate new body of law was quickly developed to deal with gold mining claims and water rights.There was vicious mistreatment of Native Americans, Chinese immigrants, and Mexicans. By the 1860s, San Francisco had developed a professional police force to dispense with the use of vigilante actions. By 1865, courts, legislators, lawyers, and the legal profession at large had a legal system that operated smoothly.

== White-shoe firms ==
The American idiom, "white shoe", first appeared in print in 1953, referring to various collegiate cliques by their favored shoe color, then as "white-shoe college boys" in the J.D. Salinger 1957 novel, Franny and Zooey. The colloquialism came to represent the long-established, high-prestige, typically White Anglo Saxon Protestant (WASP) professional services companies that they typically trained to serve. Such firms hired well-tailored people, usually male, and often outfitted with white buckskin shoes with red soles, inspiring the moniker, who possessed useful family connections and degrees from top law schools, such as Harvard, Yale, and Columbia. White shoe firms emerged in the late 19th century, and were most typically based in New York, Boston, or Philadelphia, where they catered to major corporations. These firms were especially in demand by major railroads, which were built through complicated consolidations and faced complex legal situations in multiple states. Previously, law firms were small operations with two or three partners and a handful of clerks. Emerging corporations grew much too large and complex, and were spread over too many legal jurisdictions for a small firm to service.

A half-century before the term was coined, its key operational characteristics of firms remained the same as those developed by Paul Cravath, who made a reputation from handling complex lawsuits for the emerging electrical industry. Devising the Cravath System, he enlarged the law office, and professionalized it by establishing full-time librarians, a recruiting system focused on leading law schools, lockstep compensation and partners who specialized in specific practice areas, a model largely followed by white-shoe firms throughout the 20th century.

== Diversity ==
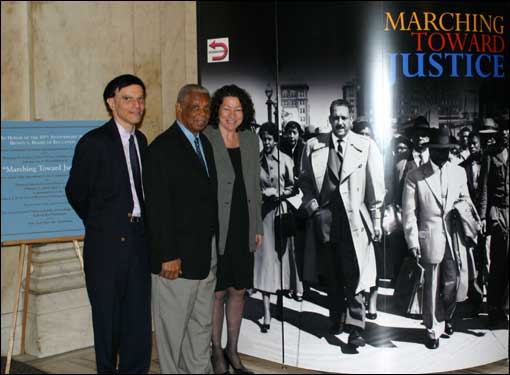
U.S. circuit judges Robert A. Katzmann, Damon J. Keith, and Sonia Sotomayor (later Associate Justice) at a 2004 exhibit on the Fourteenth Amendment, Thurgood Marshall, and Brown v. Board of Education

=== Female lawyers ===
In 1900, there were 108,000 lawyers and judges in the U.S., the great majority of whom were white males. Opportunities for females remained highly limited. A notable example, Isabel Darlington, was admitted to Pennsylvania's Chester County Bar Association in 1897. She was the only female lawyer in lightly populated Chester County until the shortages of men in World War II allowed for more opportunities for women.

In 1955, there were 5,000 female lawyers, 1.3 percent of the country's total. Law schools generally rejected female students— only four percent of the students in 1965 were women. By 1973, the figure was 16 percent; by 1979 it was 32 percent. This transition began under President Jimmy Carter's leadership, in the late 1970s. Sandra Day O'Connor (born 1930) graduated third in her class at Stanford Law School in 1952, where she served on the Stanford Law Review. She was elected a county judge in 1974 and later was elevated to an appellate court. President Ronald Reagan astonished the nation in 1981 when he appointed her as the first female on the United States Supreme Court. In 2019, the American Bar Association reported that, while women consistently comprised half of the student body of American law schools, "only 23% of law firm partners are women" and women part minorities represented by just "3% of all partners and only 2% of equity partners".

=== African American lawyers ===
Opportunities for Black lawyers were scarce outside the black community. William Thaddeus Coleman Jr., after graduating first in his class at Harvard Law School in 1946, became the first Black law clerk at the U.S. Supreme Court, in 1948. In 1949, he became the first Black lawyer hired at New York's Paul, Weiss, Rifkind, Wharton & Garrison. He was the second Black person be appointed to the cabinet, serving as former president Gerald Ford's Secretary of Transportation, from 1975 to 1977.

The legacy of racial segregation remains in the legal business - with, for instance, Davis Polk being named after John W. Davis, a defender of racial segregation and state control of education.

=== Hispanic and Latin American lawyers ===
In the first half of the 19th century, Mexico established a judicial system for its northernmost districts, in the present-day Southwestern United States. There were no professionally trained lawyers or judges. Instead, there were numerous legal roles such as notario, escribano, asesor, auditor de Guerra, justicia mayor, procurador, and juez receptor. With the annexation by the United States in 1848, Congress established an entirely new territorial legal system, implementing U.S. laws, forms, and procedures. A vast majority of lawyers and judges were new arrivals from the United States, as there was no place in the new system for the original Mexican roles. Elfego Baca (1865–1945) was an outlaw-turned-lawman, lawyer, and politician in New Mexico in the late 19th and early 20th centuries. In 1888, after serving as a County Sheriff, Baca became a U.S. Marshal. He served for two years and then began studying law. In December 1894, he was admitted to the bar and practiced law in New Mexico until 1904, then held numerous local political offices; when New Mexico became a state, in 1912, he was the unsuccessful Republican candidate for Congress. In the late 1950s, Disney turned Baca into the first Hispanic popular culture hero in the United States, through depictions in various television shows, six comic books, a feature film, and related merchandising. Nevertheless, Disney deliberately avoided ethnic tension by presenting Baca as a generalized Western hero, portraying a standard hero similar to "Davy Crockett, but in Mexican dress".

There has been a significant increase in Hispanic females entering the legal profession since the start of the 21st century. They have made steady progress in political incorporation via the judiciary, especially in county courts.

=== Jewish lawyers ===
Prior to the New Deal, many top law firms hired few if any Jews, even Jewish law review editors. For instance, future Supreme Court justice Felix Frankfurter was the first Jew hired by one New York firm. A 1937 survey found that Jewish lawyers in NY were paid less than 80% as much as non-Jewish lawyers. It also found that Jews have difficulty getting hired by law firms, so most (68%) had their own solo or small firms. They were also limited to "the least lucrative types of clientele and fields of law practice."

Jewish lawyers also faced an uphill climb for judicial appointments, even after Louis Brandeis (1916) and Benjamin N. Cardozo (1932) were appointed to the Supreme Court.

Jewish lawyers were often discriminated against and were not hired by many major law firms of the time. These lawyers began to establish their own firms, which became increasingly successful as the 20th century progressed. Major law firms established by Jews attained elite status in dealing with top-ranked corporations. As late as 1950, there was not a single large law firm started by Jews in New York City. By 1965, however, six of the 20 largest firms were founded by Jews, and by 1980, four of the ten largest were founded by Jewish lawyers.

=== Diversity in the judiciary ===
Franklin D. Roosevelt appointed the first Black federal judge, William H. Hastie in 1937. Reynaldo G. Garza, a protégé of Lyndon B. Johnson, was appointed as first Hispanic federal judge in 1961. Lyndon Johnson appointed Thurgood Marshall as the first Black Justice on the Supreme Court in 1967. He was best known for his 1954 arguments as First-Director counsel in the overturning of segregation in schools in Brown v. Board of Education. When Marshall retired, George Bush appointed a conservative Black lawyer and former Chairman of the United States Equal Employment Opportunity Commission (1982-1990) and judge in the United States Court of Appeals for the District of Columbia Circuit (1990-1991), Clarence Thomas, to the Supreme Court. He was confirmed in October of 1991 by the U.S senate. In 2009, President Barack Obama appointed Sonia Sotomayor, a woman of Puerto Rican origin, to the Supreme Court. She has the distinction of being its first Hispanic Justice.

== 21st century ==
During 2010 to 2025, 15 or more firms comprising 100 or more lawyers shuttered.

=== Pandemic 2020–2022 ===
The COVID-19 pandemic had a major influence on many practices within the legal profession. In 2021, Thomson Reuters published a joint study of Georgetown University Law Center on Ethics and the Legal Profession and the Thomson Reuters Institute, "2021 Report on the State of the Legal Market", which states:

To say that the past year has been an extraordinary one for the legal market would be a gross understatement. The combined effects of a global pandemic, a serious economic downturn, social activism, and political uncertainty in the United States and elsewhere clearly make 2020 a year for the record books. It was a year in which law firms experienced unprecedented disruptions in their operations and were forced to adapt rapidly to dramatic market changes. That most firms were able to adjust to these challenges with notable success is a tribute to the innovation and resiliency of law firms and their leaders.

— 2021 Report on the State of the Legal Market

=== Artificial intelligence ===
A Northwestern University study published in March 2026 concluded that 60 percent of federal judges were using artificial intelligence (AI) in their work. In April, the American Bar Association reported that 69 percent of legal professionals employed AI at work.

== See also ==
- History of the legal profession
- The American Lawyer, monthly magazine published since 1979
- The Green Bag, popular magazine for lawyers
- Jurist
- Law professor
- Law school in the United States
- Lawyer
- Legal education in the United States
- Legal profession
- List of law schools in the United States
- List of jurists
- Paralegal
- Targeting of law firms and lawyers under the second Trump administration
- American Bar Association
