= National Association of Legal Assistants =

- Abbreviation: NALA
- Formation: April 19, 1975
- Founders: Jane H. Terhune; Dorthea Jorde
- Founded at: Minot, North Dakota
- Type: Professional association
- Legal status: 501(c)(6) nonprofit
- Purpose: Paralegal certification and professional development
- Headquarters: Tulsa, Oklahoma
- Region served: United States
- Website: nala.org

The National Association of Legal Assistants (NALA), also branded as NALA – The Paralegal Association, is a professional organization for paralegals in the United States. Founded in April 1975 and headquartered in Tulsa, Oklahoma, the organization provides the Certified Paralegal (CP®) credential, the only paralegal certification accredited by the National Commission for Certifying Agencies (NCCA). With approximately 6,000 individual members and more than 7,000 members through more than 60 affiliated state and local associations across 30 states, it is the largest paralegal membership organization in the country.

== History ==
=== Founding (1974–1975) ===
The origins of NALA trace back to the early 1970s when the paralegal profession was rapidly developing. In 1974, the National Association of Legal Secretaries (NALS), which had worked with the American Bar Association's Special Committee on Legal Assistants since 1968, created a task force to develop a national certification examination for legal assistants. After researching existing certification programs, the task force determined that a separate national association dedicated specifically to legal assistants was needed.

A proposal to form an independent association was developed when the task force met with the NALS Executive Committee in Tulsa, Oklahoma, in January 1975. Jane H. Terhune and Dorthea Jorde, both Professional Legal Secretaries, worked with NALS corporate attorney John M. Freese and NALS Executive Director Maxine Dover to draft the articles of incorporation, constitution, and bylaws.

The articles of incorporation for the National Association of Legal Assistants, Inc. were signed on April 19, 1975, in Minot, North Dakota, establishing the organization as an Oklahoma nonprofit corporation. Jane H. Terhune was elected as the first president. Marge L. Dover was hired as the first executive director on October 16, 1975, and served in that position for 40 years until 2015.

=== Development and growth ===
By March 1976, NALA membership had grown to more than 1,200, making it the largest national paralegal organization at that time. The first certification examination was administered in November 1976 to 90 candidates, with 42 achieving the Certified Legal Assistant (CLA) credential.

Key programs were established throughout the 1980s and 1990s, including specialty certifications (1982), the National Paralegal Utilization and Compensation Survey (1986), and web-based continuing education through NALACampus.com (1998). The organization also filed amicus briefs in significant Supreme Court cases, including Missouri v. Jenkins (1989), which established that paralegal time could be billed at market rates in attorney fee awards.

The Certified Paralegal (CP®) service mark was obtained from the United States Patent and Trademark Office in 2004. Two years later, the Advanced Certified Paralegal (ACP®) program was introduced for Certified Paralegals seeking specialized expertise.

The National Commission for Certifying Agencies (NCCA) accredited the Certified Paralegal program on April 30, 2014, making it the only nationally accredited paralegal certification program. The certification program has been reaccredited twice, with current accreditation extending through May 31, 2029. The organization rebranded to NALA – The Paralegal Association in 2016. NALA celebrated its 50th anniversary in 2025.

== Certification programs ==
=== Certified Paralegal (CP®) ===
More than 21,000 individuals have achieved the Certified Paralegal credential since 1976. The program is the only paralegal certification accredited by the National Commission for Certifying Agencies (NCCA).

Two parts comprise the CP® examination. The Knowledge Exam is offered year-round and contains 120 multiple-choice questions covering ten areas, including the United States legal system, civil litigation, contracts, corporate/commercial law, criminal law and procedure, estate planning and probate, real estate and property law, torts, professional and ethical responsibility, and debtor/creditor and bankruptcy.

Candidates who pass the Knowledge Exam become eligible for the Skills Exam, offered quarterly. This section consists of a written essay focusing on legal writing and critical thinking. Renewal of the credential is required every five years through continuing legal education.

The CP® credential is recognized by the American Bar Association as a mark of high professional achievement, and more than 47 paralegal organizations and numerous state bar associations acknowledge it as the definitive paralegal certification.

=== Advanced Certified Paralegal (ACP®) ===
NALA introduced the Certified Legal Assistant Specialist (CLAS) exam in 1982 and rebranded it in 2006 as the Advanced Certified Paralegal program. This program has offered dozens of specialty courses for Certified Paralegals seeking to demonstrate advanced expertise in specific legal practice areas. Each course is approximately 20 hours in length and includes an assessment.

More than 3,500 individuals have earned the ACP® credential as of 2025. Eligibility for the ACP® credential is limited to current Certified Paralegals, though the courses are available for continuing education to any legal professional.

== Membership and structure ==
As a 501(c)(6) nonprofit organization governed by a Board of Directors, the organization maintains approximately 6,000 individual members as of 2025. Honorary membership status is granted to members who maintain active membership for at least 25 consecutive years. There are more than 350 honorary members as of 2025.

An affiliated association program began in 1977, allowing state and local paralegal organizations to partner with NALA. There are more than 60 NALA-affiliated associations across more than 30 states, representing more than 7,000 members. The Affiliated Associations Director serves as a voting member of the Board of Directors.

== Educational programs ==
=== Continuing legal education ===
NALA offers multiple continuing legal education programs. There are more than 200 on-demand webinars that are accessible 24/7 through the organization's website as of 2025, along with regularly scheduled live webinars throughout the year. The educational offerings cover diverse legal practice areas and professional development topics.

=== Annual conference ===
Since 1975, NALA has held an annual conference to provide continuing legal education credits and networking opportunities and host its annual business meetings. NALA held its 50th conference in 2025.

=== Publications ===
NALA has published Facts & Findings, its quarterly magazine, since 1975. Distribution reaches over 6,700 subscribers as of 2024. The magazine has received recognition from the APEX Awards for Publication Excellence.

NALA has also published several reference works, including the NALA Manual for Paralegals and Legal Assistants (six editions from 1979 to 2014) and The Paralegal's Companion: Fundamentals for Legal Practitioners and Those Preparing for the CP® Exam (2024).

== Advocacy ==
NALA has engaged in ongoing advocacy efforts on behalf of the paralegal profession since its founding, including filing amicus briefs in significant legal cases addressing paralegal utilization and fee awards.

In Missouri v. Jenkins (491 U.S. 274, 1989), NALA filed an amicus brief supporting the calculation of paralegal time at market rates rather than cost-based rates in attorney fee awards. The Supreme Court ruled in favor of this approach, establishing an important precedent for paralegal billing practices. The organization was specifically cited in Footnote 11 of the Court's opinion, which referenced a NALA survey showing that 77% of 1,800 legal assistants reported their law firms charged clients for paralegal work on an hourly billing basis.

NALA filed another amicus brief in Richlin Security Service Co. v. Chertoff (553 U.S. 571, 2008), supporting the award of paralegal fees at market rates under the Equal Access to Justice Act. The Supreme Court ruled in favor of market rate reimbursement.

The National Utilization & Compensation Survey has been conducted since 1986, with results published approximately every two years to examine educational backgrounds, work environments, compensation levels, and responsibilities of paralegals nationwide.

Collaboration with other paralegal organizations in 2024 led to the establishment of August 6 as National Paralegal Day, commemorating the date in 1968 when the American Bar Association created the Special Committee on Lay Assistants (now the Standing Committee on Paralegals).

Congressman Kevin Hern (R-OK) read a statement into the Congressional Record on August 6, 2024, recognizing the first National Paralegal Day and thanking paralegals for their contributions to the legal profession.

== Leadership ==
Since its founding, 27 presidents have led the organization, beginning with Jane H. Terhune (1975–1977). Three Executive Directors or Chief Executive Officers have served: Marge L. Dover (1975–2015), Dr. Greta Zeimetz, CAE (2015–2019), and Vanessa Finley, MBA, CAE (2019–present).

== Mission and vision ==
Mission: Equipping paralegals for the challenges of the future through certification, professional development, and advocacy.

Vision: Ensuring paralegals are known and valued as an integral part of the legal ecosystem.

== See also ==
Paralegal

American Bar Association

National Federation of Paralegal Associations

Legal education in the United States
