= Paralegal =

Paraprofessional who assists qualified lawyers in their legal work

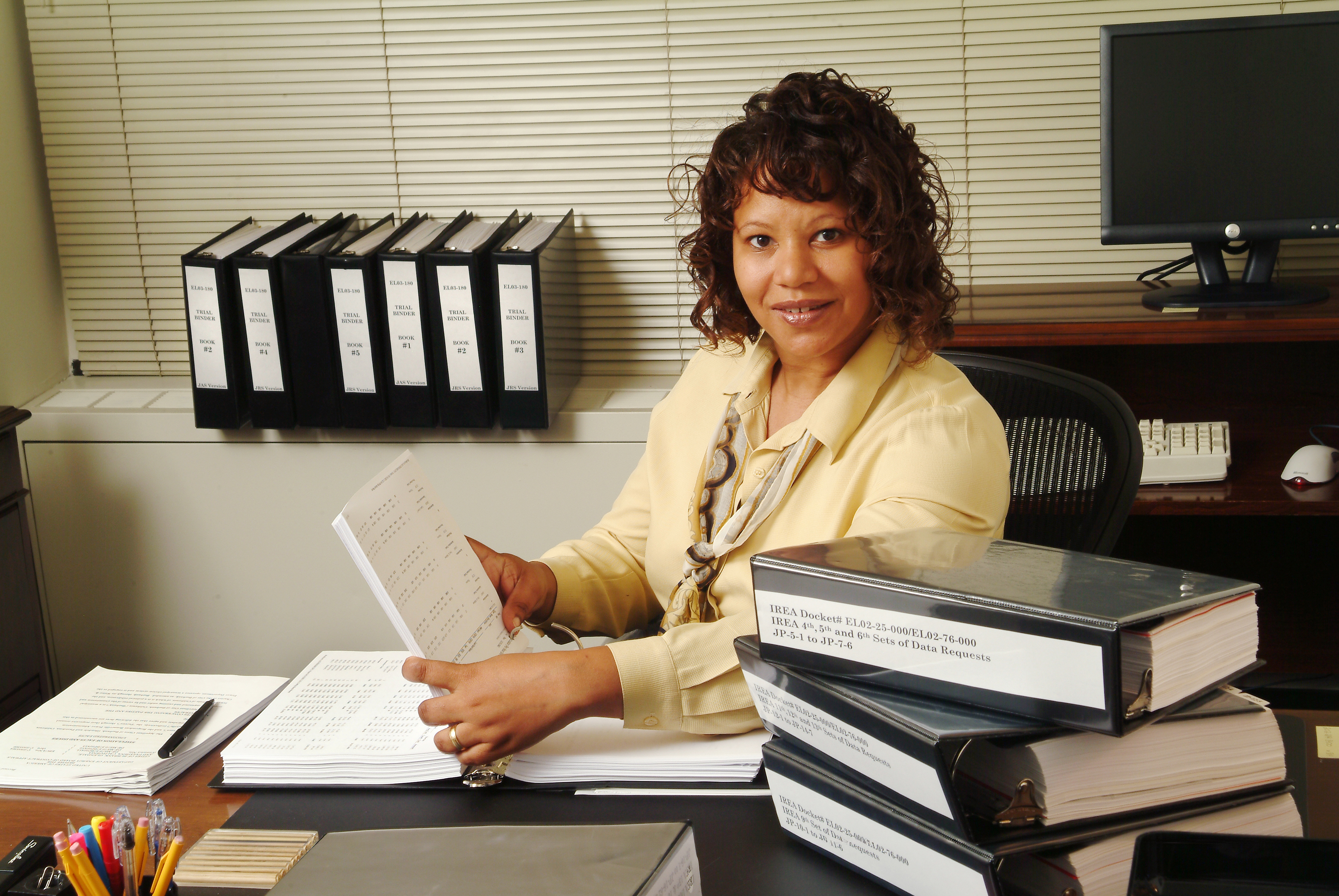
A paralegal in photo distributed by NARA, 2004

A paralegal, also known as a legal assistant or paralegal specialist, is a legal professional who performs tasks that require knowledge of legal concepts but not the full expertise of a lawyer with an admission to practice law. The market for paralegals is broad, including consultancies, companies that have legal departments or that perform legislative and regulatory compliance activities in areas such as environment, labor, intellectual property, zoning, and tax.

Legal offices and public bodies sometimes have paralegals in support activities outside of the standard titles used in the profession. There is a diverse array of work experiences attainable within the paralegal (legal assistance) field, ranging between internship, entry-level, associate, junior, mid-senior, and senior level positions.

In the United States in 1967, the American Bar Association (ABA) endorsed the concept of the paralegal and, in 1968, established its first committee on legal assistants. In 2018, the ABA amended their definition of paralegal removing the reference to legal assistants. The current definition reads, "A paralegal is a person, qualified by education, training, or work experience who is employed or retained by a lawyer, law office, corporation, governmental agency or other entity and who performs specifically delegated substantive legal work for which a lawyer is responsible."

The exact nature of their work and limitations that the law places on the tasks that they are allowed to perform vary between nations and jurisdictions. Paralegals generally are not allowed to offer legal services independently in most jurisdictions. In some jurisdictions, paralegals can conduct their own business and provide services such as settlements, court filings, legal research and other auxiliary legal services. These tasks often have instructions from a solicitor attached.

Recently, some US and Canadian jurisdictions have created a new profession where experienced paralegals are being licensed, with or without attorney supervision, to allow limited scope of practice in high-need practice areas such as family law, bankruptcy and landlord-tenant law in an effort to combat the access-to-justice crisis. The education, experience, testing, and scope of practice requirements vary widely across the various jurisdictions. So too are the number of titles jurisdictions are using for these new practitioners, including Limited License Legal Technician, Licensed Paralegals, Licensed Paraprofessionals, Limited Licensed Paralegals, Limited License Paraprofessionals, Allied Legal Professionals, etc.

In the United States, a paralegal is protected from some forms of professional liability under the theory that paralegals are working as an enhancement of an attorney, who takes ultimate responsibility for the supervision of the paralegal's work and work product. Paralegals often have taken a prescribed series of courses in law and legal processes. Paralegals may analyze and summarize depositions, prepare and answer interrogatories, conduct document review, draft procedural motions and other routine briefs, perform legal research and analysis, legislative assistance (legislative research), draft research memos, and perform some administrative professional/quasi-secretarial or legal secretarial duties, as well as perform case and project management. Paralegals often handle drafting much of the paperwork in probate cases, divorce actions, bankruptcies, and investigations. Consumers of legal services are typically billed for the time paralegals spend on their cases. In the United States, they are not authorized by the government or other agency to offer legal services (including legal advice) except in some cases in Washington State (through LLLT designation) in the same way as lawyers, nor are they officers of the court, nor are they usually subject to government-sanctioned or court-sanctioned rules of conduct. In some jurisdictions (Ontario, Canada, for example) paralegals are licensed and regulated the same way that lawyers are and these licensed professionals may be permitted to provide legal services to the public and appear before certain lower courts and administrative tribunals.

== Official definitions ==
Various professional organizations offer varying definitions of a paralegal.

- From the National Federation of Paralegal Associations (NFPA) [US]: "A paralegal is a person, qualified through education, training or work experience to perform substantive legal work that requires knowledge of legal concepts and is customarily, but not exclusively, performed by a lawyer. This person may be retained or employed by a lawyer, law office, governmental agency or other entity or may be authorized by administrative, statutory or court authority to perform this work. Substantive shall mean work requiring recognition, evaluation, organization, analysis, and communication of relevant facts and legal concepts."
- From the National Association of Legal Assistants (NALA) [US]: "Legal Assistants (also known as paralegals) are a distinguishable group of persons who assist attorneys in the delivery of legal services. Through formal education, training and experience, Legal Assistants have knowledge and expertise regarding the legal system and substantive and procedural law which qualify them to do work of a legal nature under the supervision of an attorney." This is the NALA's former 1984 definition. In 2001, the organization adopted the American Bar Association's (ABA) definition of a paralegal/Legal Assistant.
- From National Association of Legal Secretaries (NALS) [US]: "A Legal Assistant, qualified by education, training or work experience who is employed or retained by a lawyer, law office, corporation, governmental agency or other entity and who performs specifically delegated substantive legal work for which a lawyer is responsible."
- From the American Association for Paralegal Education (AAfPE) [USA]: "Paralegals perform substantive and procedural legal work as authorized by law, which work, in the absence of the paralegal, would be performed by an attorney. Paralegals have knowledge of the law gained through education, or education and work experience, which qualifies them to perform legal work. Paralegals adhere to recognized ethical standards and rules of professional responsibility."
- From the Institute of Paralegals [United Kingdom]: "A paralegal is a non-lawyer who does legal work that previously would have been done by a lawyer, or if done by a lawyer, would be charged for."
- From the Paralegal Society of Ontario [Canada]: "A paralegal is an individual qualified through education or experience licensed to provide legal services to the general public in areas authorized by the Law Society of Upper Canada."
- From the National Association of Licensed Paralegals [United Kingdom]: "A person who is educated and trained to perform legal tasks but who is not a qualified solicitor or barrister."

== Difference from legal secretaries ==
A legal secretary is generally a secretary who has a basic understanding of legal terminology and the specific formatting required by a particular court or government agency. Legal secretaries are also typically responsible for keeping case files organized and indexed, often taking on the duties of a file clerk. Although legal secretaries may be trained to prepare some basic legal papers and letters, they generally have little or no knowledge of particular legal doctrines, statutes or regulations, and typically have no training or experience in conducting legal research or drafting legal documents, pleadings, motions, briefs or other court papers. On the other hand, a typical paralegal in the United States can perform all of these tasks under an attorney or law office. Paralegals bill for their time at a higher rate than legal secretaries. In Canada the title Legal Secretary is outdated. The recognized title of that position is Legal Administrative Assistant, or Legal Assistant.

== Education, training, and certification ==
Though not required in most jurisdictions, many paralegals have completed a formal paralegal education program. Formal paralegal education programs may result in a diploma, higher diploma, advanced diploma, vocational education, associate degree, bachelor's degree, master's degree, or graduate certificate programs in the academic discipline of legal management and paralegal studies, or a paralegal professional certificate of continuing education. Others may enter through adjacent fields of study such as bachelor's, academic minors, master's, or graduate certificate degree programs in criminology and the sociology of law, political science, public administration, legal studies, sociology, literature and creative writing, history, philosophy, other fields in the social sciences, humanities, and liberal arts, or proof of higher education in any field of study or academic discipline. Many paralegals have completed all of their training or obtained a higher education degree in an adjacent field before entering the profession, while some, mostly those of the Baby Boomers Generation and some older Gen Xers unlike many Millennials, Gen Zers, and younger Gen Xers, have only on-the-job training, entering with only a high school diploma and no formal higher education which was a common phenomenon during that time, with others later completing their education while working their way up from some administrative assistance or secretarial positions in law firms, in-house legal departments, or government agencies where depending on the type of work completed may or may not have required a bachelor's degree level of specialized knowledge in a given field. Many paralegals take Continuing Legal Education (CLE), Continuing Education Unit (CEU), or Continuing Professional Development (CPD) courses to fulfill the requirements of their firm, employer, government-appointed regulatory body, association, or to obtain and maintain a professional certificate or license to practice.

== Economics ==
Paralegals exist precisely because they are not lawyers and thus can do the work more cheaply. Other than expertise, the main constraint on what work a paralegal can or cannot do tends to be local rules that reserve particular activities to lawyers. Some jurisdictions have a reserved activities list.

According to United States law, there are five specific acts which only a licensed attorney can perform:

1. Establish the attorney–client relationship
2. Give legal advice
3. Sign legal papers and pleadings on behalf of a party
4. Appear in court on behalf of another (i.e. the client)
5. Set and collect fees for legal services

Beyond the five acts above, the paralegal can perform practically any other task, including legal research, legal writing, factual investigation, preparation of exhibits, and the day-to-day tasks of case management. The key is that attorneys are entirely responsible for the actions of their paralegals and, by signing and filing court documents drafted by paralegals (or law clerks), attorneys make those documents their own.

=== Trends in use ===
In the United States, the need for accredited qualifications and bar licensure limits the number of licensed attorneys. There are some tasks for which a bar license is unnecessary but some amount of legal training is helpful. To lower costs, businesses may choose to employ paralegals to undertake such tasks. Paralegal time is typically billed at only a fraction of what a lawyer charges, and thus to the paralegal has fallen those substantive and procedural tasks which are too complex for legal secretaries (whose time is not billed) but for which lawyers can no longer bill. This in turn makes lawyers more efficient by allowing them to concentrate solely on the substantive legal issues of the case, while paralegals have become the "case managers".

The growing demand of paralegal professionals at a rapid rate has resulted in schools and colleges catering to such education being established in many places. It has been found through a survey that currently 50,000 students are enrolled in paralegal education courses. The American Association for Paralegal Education (AAPE) itself has more than 450 members; 260 of them are ABA-approved. Seminars and events are being held by various institutes to help broaden the knowledge base of the paralegal service providers and the importance associated with it. Although the nation is experiencing a recession, the paralegal profession continues to grow. Law firms and legal departments are cutting costs and increasing access to legal services by hiring paralegals.

The United Kingdom has gone one step further. Much legal work by lawyers for the poorer elements of society is legally aided, or paid for by the state. As overall costs have risen due to more people than ever engaging with the law, the government has reduced such legal aid. As a result, the work has become uneconomic for many and they have ceased doing it. Paralegal advisory firms are stepping in to fill the gap.

The increased use of paralegals has slowed the rising cost of legal services and serves in some small measure (in combination with contingency fees and insurance) to keep the cost of legal services within the reach of the regular population. However, one commentator has warned that "our profession makes a serious error if it uses legal assistants only as economic tools."

== Paralegal medical consultants ==
Some attorneys who practice in fields involving medical care have only a limited knowledge of healthcare and medical concepts and terminology. Therefore, legal medical consultants which are professional physicians, physician assistants, paramedics, nurses and respiratory therapists, have become fully trained as paralegals in the manner described above and assist behind the scenes on these cases, in addition to serving as expert witnesses from time to time.

== By country ==
=== Australia ===
Australia has a distinct regime for the utilization of paralegals. According to one paralegal studies scholar:

The legal profession’s monopoly in Australia is, however, confined to the right of appearance in a court of law and to the preparation of certain documents for reward, which leaves a vast field of legal tasks open to performance by other workers, including paralegals.

— Jill Irene Cowley

Furthermore, Australian paralegals have "little formal recognition of, or status accorded" them, yet they "require specialist education."

=== Canada ===
In Canada, paralegals are typically trained assistants who work under the supervision of lawyers and are not regulated as independent professionals, except in the Canadian province of Ontario. In Ontario, paralegals are licensed professionals regulated by legislation.

Some provinces, like British Columbia, allow lawyers to designate certain paralegals to provide additional services to clients. However, in most cases, lawyers remain fully responsible for all action or omission of the designated paralegals.

==== Ontario ====
In Ontario, paralegals are licensed by the Law Society of Ontario. Ontario is with Washington State the only jurisdiction in the western hemisphere where paralegals are licensed and the profession is regulated as officers of the court. Licensed paralegals operate within a defined scope of practice, representing clients in matters such as provincial offenses (traffic tickets, etc.), immigration, landlord and tenant disputes, labor law, small claims court (up to $50,000), and specific criminal matters. They are currently not permitted to represent clients in family court or wills and estates. By virtue of their office, licensed paralegals are commissioners for taking affidavits (swearing oaths).

In the province of Ontario paralegals are a regulated body within the legal system. Paralegals become commissioners upon licensing, and may become non-lawyer notaries, Crown prosecutor, municipal prosecutor or a justice of the peace if appointed.

Ontario recently became the first jurisdiction in North America to provide for the licensing of independent paralegals. This task will be the responsibility of the Law Society of Ontario (founded in 1797), which already regulates Ontario's 40,000 or so lawyers. Aspiring paralegals must complete an accredited educational program and complete a licensing exam. The Society will also be responsible for disciplining paralegals who do not conform to rules of professional conduct, known as the Paralegal Rules of Conduct.

In Ontario, as of December 2017, licensed paralegals are now endorsed and recognized as officers of the court.

The Law Society began issuing paralegal licenses to grandparent applicants who fulfilled all the necessary licensing requirements (including insurance) in April 2008. Paralegals who provide legal services to the public must carry professional liability insurance in accordance with By-Law 6, Part II, section 12 (1). Licensees must provide written proof of their compliance with this requirement to carry mandatory insurance before they begin providing legal services, as well as on an annual basis. Paralegal services may be provided via a sole proprietorship, partnership or professional corporation. Licensees are strongly encouraged to seek professional advice on the best business structure for their particular situations. A paralegal license allows a paralegal to independently represent clients in provincial offences court, summary conviction criminal court, small claims court and administrative tribunals such as the Financial Services Commission of Ontario or the Workplace Safety and Insurance Board. The role that a paralegal has in the United States is similar to the role of a law clerk or legal assistant in Ontario. Many paralegals in Ontario work in the areas of permitted practice for paralegals and also work alongside lawyers in areas of practice that are only permitted to be practiced by lawyers. It is illegal for paralegals in Ontario to independently practice in an area of law that is permitted only for lawyers. An example of this is family law, or an indictable offence in criminal law.

All lawyers and paralegals who practice law and provide legal services in Ontario, are required to complete the CPD program. Continuing professional development (CPD) is the maintenance and enhancement of a lawyer or paralegal's professional knowledge, skills, attitudes and professionalism throughout the individual's career. It is a positive tool that benefits lawyers and paralegals and is an essential component of the commitment they make to the public to practice law or provide legal services competently and ethically.

=== Japan ===
In Japan, the institution of judicial scrivener (司法書士, shihō shoshi) exists, and functions similarly to paralegals. Scriveners perform legal work, above the level of secretary but below the level of attorney, and may be attached to an attorney's office or operate independently. Scriveners may represent clients in some low-level matters, but not in more advanced stages of litigation. As with lawyers in Japan, scriveners are regulated and must pass an exam.

=== South Africa ===
In South Africa, legal assistants or paralegals must have extensive knowledge of the law and the administration of justice. Their duties may include: liaising with clients of their employers to assist in solving legal problems, legal research, preparing cases for court and liaising with the public. This programme is uniquely designed to impart a comprehensive overview of all aspects of paralegal specialisation and an understanding of individual rights and the rights of others. Paralegal offers the use and application of skills and competencies related to criminal law and procedure, civil litigation, wills and estates, dispute resolution, legal advice, property law and conveyancing as well as legal office practice management and debt collecting/counselling.

Paralegals in South Africa are hired mostly by Legal Aid South Africa, big corporations, Patent law firms, legal firms, Estate agents, Government Departments etc. to provide legal support to those corporate world. Legal support may be by legal research, investigation/inspectors, legal advice or legal assistance. Certification may be acquired at: Tshwane University of Technology National Diploma in Legal Assistance/Paralegal, University of Johannesburg Diploma in Paralegal, UNISA National Diploma in Law, South African School of Paralegals, Intec College Diploma in Paralegal, South African Law School Qualification in Paralegal, Damelin College Paralegal, Boston City Campus Paralegal certificate. Salaries range from R60,000 to R450,000 per year depending on experience. Newly established law firms in South Africa are likely to hire qualified Paralegals with 3 year qualification in Legal Studies to provide Legal assistance. Though the South African Law Society and The Minister of Justice do want to come with regulation to guide paralegals in South Africa just like Canada and the US, many practicing attorneys and Advocates did disprove in many instances however the new legislation is pending.

=== South Korea ===
Paralegals are not regulated and work as assistants to lawyers in law offices. There is a role of Judicial Scrivener, but it is a different legal role in South Korea

In South Korea a similar system to the Japanese exists, and is known as beopmusa (Hangul: 법무사, Hanja: 法務士), but they cannot be compared to the role of a paralegal, as beopmusa's can open their own offices and take on tasks of lawyers similar to notaries

=== United Kingdom ===
==== England and Wales ====
The original concept of paralegals in the UK started with the Paralegal Association in the mid-1980s (now the National Association of Licensed Paralegals). However the oldest incorporated professional body for paralegals in the UK who set the competency standards for paralegals and legal secretaries, issue legal qualifications, and support, represent and promote paralegals is the Institute of Paralegals.

Both the Association and Institute have a similar role in recognizing and registering paralegals but do not always agree on all the principles of practice.

Paralegals have increasingly become recognized as a distinct group of legal professionals, rather than exclusively assistants to qualified lawyers.

Due to a lack of metrics it is unclear exactly how many paralegals there are in the United Kingdom. The Office of National Statistics and the register of Standard Occupational Classification estimate that there are currently 76,000 mid-skilled "legal associate professionals". Research published in 2014 by the Institute for Public Policy Research (IPPR) predicts that this figure is set to grow by 17% within the next decade. Moreover, it is estimated that there are now almost 4,000 government registered/regulated paralegal advisory firms offering services that would previously have been offered only by lawyers.This is because most legal work in the United Kingdom is deregulated and therefore there is nothing to stop anyone from opening their own paralegal law firm.

As the term 'paralegal' is not protected like the term 'solicitor' anyone may call himself/herself a paralegal without any qualification or registrations. Professional bodies are lobbying for this to change and the term 'paralegal' to become a protected title.

Paralegals in England and Wales may only offer limited legal advice, as may any person, with the following exceptions strictly forbidden:

1. Undertaking the activities reserved to solicitors under the Solicitors Act 1974;
2. Undertaking immigration work if not registered with the Office of the Immigrations Services Commissioner;
3. Undertaking certain types of claims/compensation related work if not registered with the Ministry of Justice.

In the United Kingdom, the Solicitors Act 1974 reserves certain activities for solicitors. Broadly, these include:

- Preparing and lodging documents concerning the conveying or charging of land. Since repealed and now also conducted by Licensed Conveyancers
- Undertaking probate law.
- Undertaking litigation (except in the small claims court).

Paralegals technically have very limited rights to conduct litigation/rights of audience before courts/tribunals. In practice though many appear in courts and particularly tribunals at all levels as assistants.

Paralegals also act as Police Station Representatives if they are accredited, giving general advice to clients held in police custody.

==== Scotland ====
Scotland has separate legal jurisdiction from England and Wales. The term "paralegal" came into use from the 1980s. There have always been individuals undertaking legal work but not qualified as a solicitor but they would have had other titles such as 'legal assistant'. From the early 1990s the term "paralegal" became more common. In 1993 Scottish Paralegals Association was founded. It is a voluntary body whose remit is to promote the interests of paralegals in Scotland. From 1991 Scotland's colleges began to offer paralegal qualifications, awarded by the Scottish Qualification Authority, namely the Higher National Diploma and Certificate in Legal Services. They were offered by Central College of Commerce, Stevenson College and Dundee College. As a result of the efforts of the Scottish Paralegal Association and in particular its president Christine Lambie, in 2010 the Law Society of Scotland, the solicitors' professional body, instituted the Law Society of Scotland Registered Paralegal scheme. This was a voluntary scheme providing a professional status for high quality paralegals. Around 400 paralegals, mainly individuals who had come through the ranks in legal firms, joined the scheme. From 2010 Scottish Qualification Authority and Stirling University offered qualifications for individuals wishing to enter the Registered Paralegal profession. Paralegals qualify in particular legal domains, e.g., Domestic Conveyancing; and Wills & Executries. In 2017 the name of the scheme was changed to Law Society of Scotland Accredited Paralegal scheme.

==== Professional societies ====
The largest number of paralegals in the UK are represented by the Chartered Institute of Legal Executives (CILEX). Unlike other paralegal bodies CILEX is an Approved Regulator, meaning all its members are independently regulated in the public interest and must comply with a code of conduct, including all its paralegal members. CILEX is also the only body that provides paralegals with a limited progression route to lawyer status.

CILEX provides a non-University route to qualification as lawyer, with the majority of its members learning on-the-job and working as paralegals. It is open to those with or without law degrees, and allows paralegals to progress through to ultimately become fully qualified lawyers, partners, advocates, coroners and judges, subject to achieving the correct level of qualifications, skills, and experience.

Since 1994 City and Guilds, in association with CILEX, has offered the UK's leading range of nationally and internationally approved qualifications for paralegals and legal secretaries, which have been taken by over 20,000 people. They offer a Level 2 Award/Certificate/Diploma in Legal Studies qualification. This provides the underpinning knowledge which will help in day-to-day work and will also allows progression onto the CILEX route to becoming a lawyer. The qualification is divided into units and is assessed by way of assignments and a multiple-choice test. A Level 3 Diploma in Vocational Paralegal Studies qualification is also available, and this is equivalent to A-level standard. The qualification is divided into units and again, is assessed by way of assignments. The qualifications are also recognized by the CILEX as a route into their membership grades.

The Institute of Paralegals (IOP) administer a Route to Qualification: the nationally recognized career path for professional paralegals. They also set and administer Competency Standards for paralegals and legal secretaries. The Institute of Paralegals (IOP) are:

- an incorporated paralegal representative body in the United Kingdom whose application for institute status was supported by the Bar Council, Law Society, Crown Prosecution Service and Citizens Advice
- the only body for professional paralegals to have relied on state funding to help develop the paralegal profession
- an organisation which publishes a Paralegal Code of Conduct
- a member of LawCare
- an organisation which publishes Competency Standards for the paralegal profession (drafted with the assistance of law firms and (in part) by Her Majesty's Land Registry and vetted for professional conduct requirements by the Solicitors Regulation Authority)
- an organisation which administers a paralegal career path – the Route to Qualification. The R2Q turns a job into a career, and an occupation into a profession. It is supported by scores of local law societies, university law schools, law firms and others

NALP (National Association of Licensed Paralegals) is an awarding body for paralegal qualifications, recognized as an awarding organisation by Ofqual, the regulator of qualifications in England and Wales. NALP offers self-regulation and Licensing for paralegals in England & Wales. NALP's objective is to raise the profile of paralegals in the UK and has dedicated itself to the promoting the status of paralegals and paralegal training in the United Kingdom and abroad. NALP offers training and qualifications at all levels. NALP is a not for profit company limited by guarantee.

There are various levels of certification and membership according to the level of training, qualification and experience. To become a Licensed Paralegal a person should have an acceptable qualification in law, e.g., the Association's Diploma in Paralegal Studies, ILEX, Law Degree or HND (plus a procedural law qualification) or any other qualification deemed suitable, and who can satisfy the other criteria laid down by the Association namely: knowledge, competence, dedication, character requirements and continuous professional development.

The Institute of Paralegals (IOD) is an incorporated professional body for paralegals in the UK. A not-for-profit organisation, they set the competency standards for paralegals and legal secretaries, issue legal qualifications, and support, represent and promote paralegals. The National Association of Licensed Paralegals(NALP) was established in 1987 and is the professional self-regulatory governing body for accredited paralegals. Access into the profession can either be with a law degree or without. Those who are already graduates can take The Post Graduate Diploma in Paralegal Practice (PPC) (similar to the LPC for solicitors). Those that have no previous qualification can do the Diploma in Paralegal Studies. The NALP is an awarding body regulated by OFQUAL and is also a member of the National Federation of Paralegal Associations (based in the US).

As a not-for-profit professional body incorporated by guarantee, they were formed in 2003. They were granted institute status by the UK government in 2005, with the support of, among others, The Law Society of England & Wales, the Bar Council, Citizens Advice and the Crown Prosecution Service, all of whom recognized the need for the developing paralegal profession to have a representative body.

==== Salary ====
In the United Kingdom paralegal salaries in law firms can range from around £15,000 in some rural or suburban areas but may reach as high as £60,000 – £80,000 for the most senior in the larger city firms and some PLCs. A paralegal can also work as a freelance offering their services to solicitors, performing tasks such assisting Counsel at court, taking notes in court, and presenting applications to District Judges in chambers. They can be paid on a daily or hourly rate earning up to £260 per day.

=== United States ===
Badge of US Air Force Paralegals

In the United States, paralegals originated as assistants to lawyers at a time when only lawyers offered legal services. In those jurisdictions where the local legal profession/judiciary is involved in paralegal recognition/accreditation, the profession of paralegal still basically refers to those people working under the direct supervision of a lawyer. The profession of paralegal varies greatly between the states, because some states do require paralegals to be licensed. In other jurisdictions however, such as the United Kingdom, the lack of local legal profession/judiciary oversight means that the definition of paralegal encompasses non-lawyers doing legal work, regardless of whom they do it for. Although most jurisdictions recognize paralegals to a greater or lesser extent, there is no international consistency as to definition, job-role, status, terms and conditions of employment, training, regulation or anything else and so each jurisdiction must be looked at individually.

In the United States, there is no such thing as a paralegal licensed by a government body; rather, paralegals can be "registered," "certified," or certificated by private organizations.

There are two major national organizations that offer professional certification to paralegals who meet voluntary regulation standards. NALA - The Paralegal Association began its certification program in 1976, and the National Federation of Paralegal Associations (NFPA) began its program in 1996.

Both NALA and the NFPA offer professional certification exams that should not be confused with a paralegal certificate offered by an accredited college or university.

NALA offers its Certified Legal Assistant or Certified Paralegal examination, a comprehensive two-day examination that covers Communications, Ethics, Legal Research, Judgment and Analytical Ability, American Legal System and four sub-sections selected by the applicants from a list of nine substantive areas of the law. These sub-section tests cover general knowledge of Administrative Law, Bankruptcy, Business Organizations, Civil Litigation, Contracts, Criminal Law and Procedure, Estate, Planning and Probate, Family Law and Real Estate. After successful completion of the examination, NALA awards the paralegal the CLA (Certified Legal Assistant) or CP (Certified Paralegal) designation. Both the CLA and CP designations are trademarks owned by NALA. Paralegals who have attained further education and received a paralegal certificate are referred to as "Certificated" unless they have passed the examination and have been awarded the "Certified" designation. Additionally, those paralegals who receive the "Certified Paralegal" designation have the opportunity to earn the "Advanced Certified Paralegal" designation. There is a 45 to 50 percent pass rate for persons taking the NALA exams.

The NFPA offers its non-accredited Paralegal Advanced Competency Exam, which is a four-hour exam on a variety of legal topics; those who pass that exam can call themselves PACE-Registered Paralegals and display the RP designation. NFPA's core purpose is to advance the paralegal profession and is committed to the profession's Code of Ethics.

Some states have considered the licensure of paralegals. Whether paralegals should be licensed or certified is one of the most important issues for paralegals today.

==== Difference from lawyers ====
The greatest differences between lawyers and paralegals are that lawyers give legal advice, can set fees, appear as counsel of record in court, and sign pleadings (and other court documents) in a representative capacity. A paralegal who attempts to do any of these acts will be in violation of the unauthorized practice of law statutes in most U.S. states. Paralegals are responsible for handling tasks such as legal writing, research, and other forms of documentation for the lawyers for whom they work.

==== Penalties for unauthorized practice ====
Paralegals are restrained from exercising independence and prohibited from providing even basic legal advice to consumers of legal advice. In her book Access to Justice, Stanford law professor Deborah Rhode states: "Over four-fifths of surveyed attorneys have supported prosecution of lay practitioners, and the profession has repeatedly blocked licensing proposals that would enable independent paralegals to offer routine services. Many local, state and national bar associations have recently launched initiatives to broaden the definition, raise the penalties, and increase the enforcement of unauthorized practice prohibitions."

In some areas, legal document assistants advertise themselves as paralegals. Many states, including Florida, have enacted laws or bar rules which require any person referring to himself or herself as a paralegal to work under the supervision of a licensed attorney. This rule would prohibit those individuals working as "independent paralegals" from using the title "paralegal".

==== Salary ====
In the United States, as of May 2021, the median annual salary for a paralegal was US$56,230. Paralegals working for the U.S. federal government average around $73,580 per year while state and local government paralegals earn around $54,000 to $57,000. As of 2024, the median annual salary for paralegals and legal assistants is $61,010.

=== History ===
Paralegals have been used in the United States for almost 50 years.

==== Paralegal Day ====
Several state governments have designated a "Paralegal Day", which is not the same day everywhere, in particular New York's governor David Paterson, Michigan's governor Jennifer M. Granholm, South Carolina, Idaho's governor James E. Risch and the Texas Legislature have designated Paralegal Day in their respective states. California, Connecticut, Ohio, Commonwealth of Pennsylvania and Utah also have a Paralegal Day.

Acknowledging the need for an official day for celebrating paralegals, NALA joined with NALS, AAfPE, and NFPA to propose August 6th as National Paralegal Day in the United States.

==== Paralegal service or document preparers ====
There are a variety of services available to the general public depending on the State of residence. These companies have been known as Paralegal Services until they were required to change their names. These companies are now typically known to the general public as Court Document Preparers or Court Forms Providers. The State of Florida has numerous companies that prepare court documents for a variety of issues, such as Divorce, Bankruptcy, Paternity, Custody, Modification of Child Support, Name Change, Wills, Power of Attorney, Quit Claim Deeds, etc. If you do not have the ability to remedy your situation because of the high cost fees of any attorney a Court Document Preparer can save thousands of dollars. Such document preparers, however, frequently come under the scrutiny of various state bar organizations by overstepping the basic document preparation and engaging in what could be considered "unauthorized practice of law." Such document preparation is indeed cost-saving for those who truly want to represent themselves in a legal matter, but want to pay someone to create the required documents. If problems arise in the legal case, however, the person who hired the paralegal service needs to understand that there is typically no legal liability on the part of the paralegal service and that such institutions cannot be sued for legal malpractice. Again, the philosophy is that the person utilizing such service is representing himself or herself in all legal matters and merely hiring a document preparer.

==== California ====
As of 2022, California "is the only state in the nation that comprehensively regulates the paralegal profession."

In California, under Business and Professions Code § 6450, a paralegal must have at least one of the following:

1. An ABA-approved paralegal certificate.
2. A certificate of completion of a paralegal program at, or a degree from, a post-secondary institution that requires the successful completion of a minimum of 24 semester, or equivalent, units in law-related courses and that has been accredited by a national or regional accrediting organization or approved by the Bureau for Private Post-secondary and Vocational Education.
3. A bachelor's degree or advanced degree in any subject and at least one year of experience performing legal tasks under the supervision of an attorney that has at least three years' legal experience in California himself. The attorney must sign a written declaration stating the paralegal is qualified to perform legal tasks.
4. Before December 31, 2003, have completed a high school diploma or general equivalency diploma and a minimum of three years of law-related experience under the supervision of an attorney that has at least three years' legal experience in California himself. The attorney must sign a written declaration stating the paralegal is qualified to perform legal tasks.

Until Business and Professions Code § 6450 was signed into law by Governor Gray Davis in 2000, there was little regulation of paralegals in California. One of the purposes of regulation under Business and Professions Code § 6450 was to shut down the paralegals who were providing self-help legal services to consumers. There had been relatively few consumer complaints against paralegals; most of the complaints were from lawyers who urged the California State Bar to police the unauthorized practice of law (UPL).

In response, the State Bar appointed a Public Protection Committee to look at the L.A. bar's claim. Then, "in 1988, the Public Protection Committee unanimously recommended that the California legislature completely abolish the state's UPL laws. It further concluded that independent paralegals should be allowed to provide all types of legal services as long as they are registered with a state agency and disclose their non-lawyer status to all customers." After many local bar associations reacted in dismay, "The California Bar then appointed a third group (The Commission on Legal Technicians) to restudy the issue. This commission largely agreed with the conclusions of its predecessors and recommended that non-lawyers be authorized by the California Supreme Court to deliver legal services in several major areas (bankruptcy, family, immigration, and landlord-tenant), under the terms of a licensing scheme that would be supervised by an independent state agency."

This development culminated in some paralegals being forced to give up the title paralegal for Legal Document Assistant (LDA) in order to administer legal services directly to the public in the allowed areas under California Bus & Prof. Code § 6400. Paralegals who are members of professional associations are also bound by those associations' codes of ethics, many of which include sections prescribing that members not offer legal services directly to the public without the supervision of an attorney or law firm.

== In popular culture ==
The 2000 film Erin Brockovich is a dramatization of the real-life story of American paralegal Erin Brockovich, who won a lawsuit against Pacific Gas and Electric Company involving groundwater contamination in Hinkley, California.

In the 2008 film Eagle Eye starring Shia LaBeouf and Michelle Monaghan, Monaghan plays a single mom who works as a paralegal.

Allison DuBois, the lead character in Medium played by Patricia Arquette, was in training to become a paralegal in addition to her consultation work with the Phoenix, Arizona District Attorney's office.

The TV movie Diamond Girl (1998) features an unassuming paralegal as the main character who is in love with her attorney boss and is the sole reason for the law firm's success.

John Grisham includes many paralegals in his novels; for example, Rudy Baylor (the main character in The Rainmaker) works briefly as a paralegal – and his associate Deck Shifflet subsequently becomes Rudy's paralegal when he starts his own firm (although he terms himself a "paralawyer".)

Harvey Birdman, Attorney at Law features a paralegal in the form of Avenger, Harvey Birdman's eagle, who is usually seen managing files, preparing and presenting documents to the attorneys, and drafting letters to clients.

The TV series Suits features a young paralegal named Rachel, played by Meghan Markle, who greatly assists a young aspiring lawyer with various research and otherwise.

In the TV series Crazy Ex-Girlfriend, Rebecca's first friend in West Covina is Paula Proctor, her new firm's paralegal. Paula later goes back to school and becomes a lawyer in her own right.

== See also ==
- Bullying in the legal profession
- Community college
- Contract attorney
- Clerk of the court
- Criminology
- Grey-collar
- History of the legal profession
- Individual rights advocate
- Jurist
- Law clerk
- Legal profession
- Legal secretary
- Legislative assistant
- Proprietary colleges
- Secretary/Administrative Assistant
- Sociology of law
