= Legal profession =

Profession

Legal profession is a profession in which legal professionals study, develop and apply law. Usually, there is a requirement for someone choosing a career in law to first pass a bar examination after obtaining a law degree or some other form of legal education such as an apprenticeship in a law office.

It is difficult to generalize about the structure of the profession, because

- there are two major legal systems, and even within them, there are different arrangements in jurisdictions, and
- terminology varies greatly.

While in civil law countries there are usually distinct clearly defined career paths in law, such as judge, in common law jurisdictions there tends to be one legal profession, and it is not uncommon, for instance, that a requirement for a judge is several years of practising law privately.

== Origins ==
In Ancient Athens, despite being the centralized democracy, the profession of lawyer did not exist, there were only accusers and jurists in the courts, and trials lasted until the time of the clepsydra ended. The office of legal representative did not begin to exist until Ancient Rome, and with the arrival of the Middle Ages the profession went into decline until the Early modern age.

== Judge ==
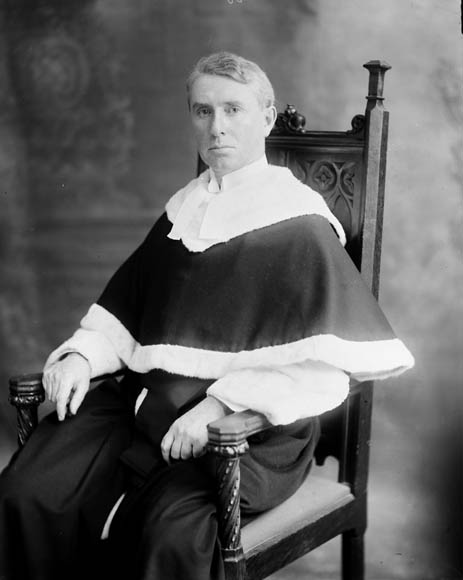
The Honourable Mr. Justice Lyman Poore Duff, Judge of the Supreme Court of Canada

Historically, this has been the first legal specialization. In civil law countries, this is often a lifelong career. In common law legal system, on the other hand, judges are recruited from practising lawyers.

== Lawyer, advocate, attorney ==
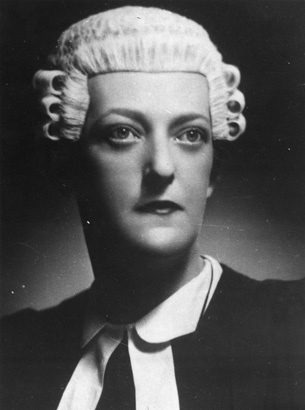
Digital reproduction of a head and shoulders portrait of Margaret Battye in formal legal dress.

Practising law means advising and representing clients as a private practitioner or in a law firm. In most countries, law graduates need to undergo some sort of apprenticeship, membership in a professional organization and a licence.

The name for this profession is lawyer or attorney in most of the English-speaking world, and advocate in many other countries. The name for this profession in canon law is canonist or canon lawyer.

In civil law countries, but also some common law jurisdictions (notably the United States), there is one Law society for all lawyers who want to provide services to the public. But in the United Kingdom and some of its former colonies, there are two quite separate kinds of lawyers providing legal services to the public.

=== Solicitor ===
Solicitors advise clients, draft contracts for them and represent them in lower courts of law.

=== Barrister ===
Barristers, also called counsels, are court specialists, who traditionally do not come into contact with their lay clients, but are instructed by solicitors. There is only about a 1-to-10 ratio of barristers to solicitors in most common law jurisdictions.

=== Prosecutor ===
The prosecutors are the lawyers who defend the state of the country. The United States, being a federation, has more than one state in which it is represented by a district attorney, with assistants who represent each of the state districts. In the United Kingdom, these individuals are known as law officers of the Crown. These are headed by an Attorney General, unless it is private.

== Jurist ==
This term is rare and formal in English and can be used to refer to an expert on law, a legal scholar, or a judge. In other words, people who study, organize, teach, and thereby also create law, often working at universities, can be called jurists in formal English. In civil law countries, their role is greater because they draft codes, which are major laws that govern whole areas of law. In common law countries, the creation and interpretation of law has traditionally been the domain of judges.

== Paralegal ==
A paralegal or legal assistant, according to one definition, is "a person, qualified by education, training or work experience who is employed or retained by a lawyer, law office, corporation, governmental agency or other entity and who performs specifically delegated substantive legal work for which a lawyer is responsible.”

== CILEX Lawyers ==
Like solicitors, CILEX Lawyers advise clients, draft contracts for them and represent them in lower courts of law.

CILEX Lawyers will have taken a vocational route to qualification (the CILEX Professional Qualification - CPQ) and unlike solicitors are qualified to practise solely in their chosen area of specialism.

== See also ==
- Immigration lawyer
- Bullying in the legal profession
- History of the legal profession
- History of the American legal profession
- Jurist
- Civil law notary
- Notary public
- Paralegal
