= Bullying in the legal profession =

Type of workplace bullying

Bullying in the legal profession is believed to be more common than in some other professions. It is believed that its adversarial, hierarchical tradition contributes towards this. Women, trainees and solicitors who have been qualified for five years or less are more impacted, as are ethnic minority lawyers and gay, lesbian, and bisexual lawyers.

Half of women lawyers and one in three men who took part in a study by the Law Council of Australia (LCA) reported they had been bullied or intimidated in the workplace. The Law Council of Australia has found that women face significant levels of discrimination, with one of the study's key figures telling Lawyers Weekly the profession is a "men's only club".

According to former High Court judge Michael Kirby, the rudeness of judges trickles down to senior lawyers who then vent their frustrations on more junior staff, thus creating a cycle of bullying and stress that is rife within the legal profession.

== See also ==
- Legal abuse
