= History of the legal profession =

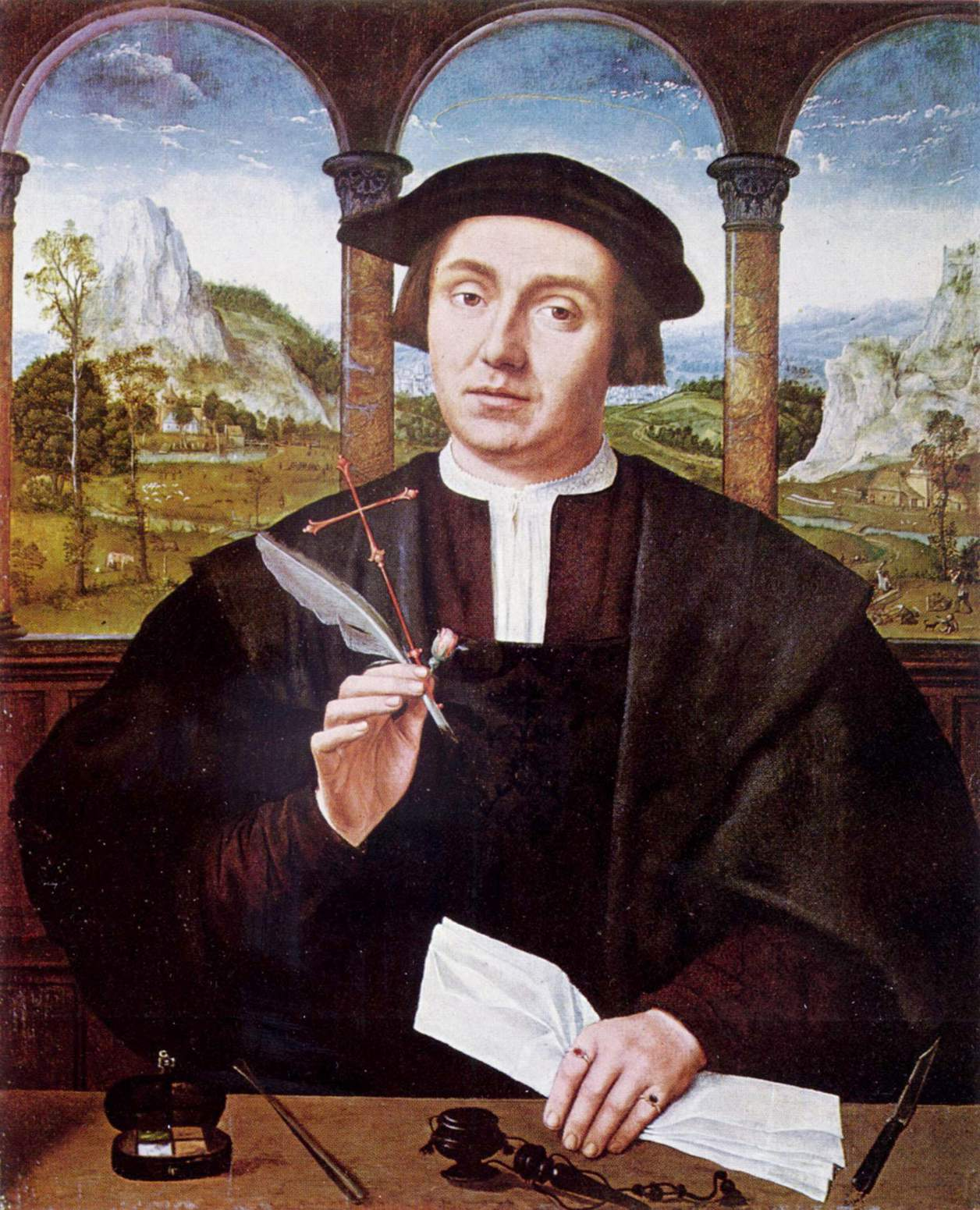
16th-century painting of a civil law notary, by Flemish painter Quentin Massys. A civil law notary is roughly analogous to a common law solicitor, except that, unlike solicitors, civil law notaries do not practice litigation.

The legal profession has its origins in ancient Greece and Rome. Although in Greece it was forbidden to take payment for pleading the cause of another, the rule was widely flouted. After the time of Claudius, lawyers (iuris consulti) could practise openly, although their remuneration was limited. A skilled and regulated profession developed gradually during the late Roman Empire and the Byzantine Empire: advocates acquired more status, and a separate class of notaries (tabelliones) appeared.

In Western Europe, the legal profession went into decline during the Middle Ages, re-emerging during the 12th and 13th centuries in the form of experts on canon law. The profession started to be regulated and to extend its reach to civil as well as ecclesiastical law.

== Ancient Greece, Rome and Byzantine Empire ==
The earliest people who could be described as "lawyers" were probably the orators of ancient Athens (see History of Athens). However, Athenian orators faced serious structural obstacles. First, there was a rule that individuals were supposed to plead their own cases, which was soon bypassed by the increasing tendency of individuals to ask a "friend" for assistance. However, around the middle of the fourth century, the Athenians disposed of the perfunctory request for a friend. Second, a more serious obstacle, which the Athenian orators never completely overcame, was the rule that no one could take a fee to plead the cause of another. This law was widely disregarded in practice, but was never abolished, which meant that orators could never present themselves as legal professionals or experts. They had to uphold the legal fiction that they were merely an ordinary citizen generously helping out a friend for free, and thus they could never organize into a real profession—with professional associations and titles and all the other pomp and circumstance—like their modern counterparts. Therefore, if one narrows the definition to those who could practice the legal profession openly and legally, then the first lawyers would have to be the orators of ancient Rome.

The ban on fees was abolished by Emperor Claudius, who legalized advocacy as a profession and allowed the Roman advocates to become the first lawyers who could practice openly and charge fees for their services—but he also imposed a fee ceiling of 10,000 sesterces. This was apparently not much money; the Satires of Juvenal complain that there was no money in working as an advocate. Like their Greek contemporaries, early Roman advocates were trained in rhetoric, not law, and the judges before whom they argued were also not law-trained. But very early on, unlike Athens, Rome developed a class of specialists who were learned in the law, known as jurisconsults (iuris consulti). Jurisconsults were wealthy amateurs who dabbled in law as an intellectual hobby. Advocates and ordinary people also went to jurisconsults for legal opinions. Thus, the Romans were the first to have a class of people who spent their days thinking about legal problems, and this is why their law became so "precise, detailed, and technical."

In the Roman Republic and early Roman Empire, jurisconsults and advocates were unregulated, since the former were amateurs and the latter were technically illegal. Any citizen could call himself an advocate or a legal expert, though whether people believed him would depend upon his personal reputation. This changed once Claudius legalized the legal profession. The centralization and bureaucratization of the profession was apparently gradual at first, but accelerated during the reign of Emperor Hadrian. At the same time, the jurisconsults went into decline during the imperial period. By the start of the Byzantine Empire, the legal profession had become well-established, heavily regulated, and highly stratified.

In the words of Fritz Schulz, "by the fourth century things had changed in the eastern Empire: advocates now were really lawyers." For example, by the fourth century, advocates had to be enrolled on the bar of a court to argue before it, they could only be attached to one court at a time, and there were restrictions (which came and went depending upon who was emperor) on how many advocates could be enrolled at a particular court. By the 380s, advocates were studying law in addition to rhetoric (thus reducing the need for a separate class of jurisconsults); in 460, Emperor Leo imposed a requirement that new advocates seeking admission had to produce testimonials from their teachers; and by the sixth century, a regular course of legal study lasting about four years was required for admission. Claudius's fee ceiling lasted all the way into the Byzantine period, though by then it was measured at 100 solidi. Of course, it was widely evaded, either through demands for maintenance and expenses or a secret barter transaction. The latter was cause for disbarment.

The notaries (tabelliones) appeared in the late Roman Empire. Like their modern-day descendants, the civil law notaries, they were responsible for drafting wills, conveyances, and contracts. They were ubiquitous and most villages had one. In Roman times, notaries were widely considered to be inferior to advocates and jurisconsults. Roman notaries were not law-trained; they were often barely literate, with an unfavorable reputation for wrapping simple transactions in mountains of legal jargon, since they were paid by the line.

== Middle Ages ==
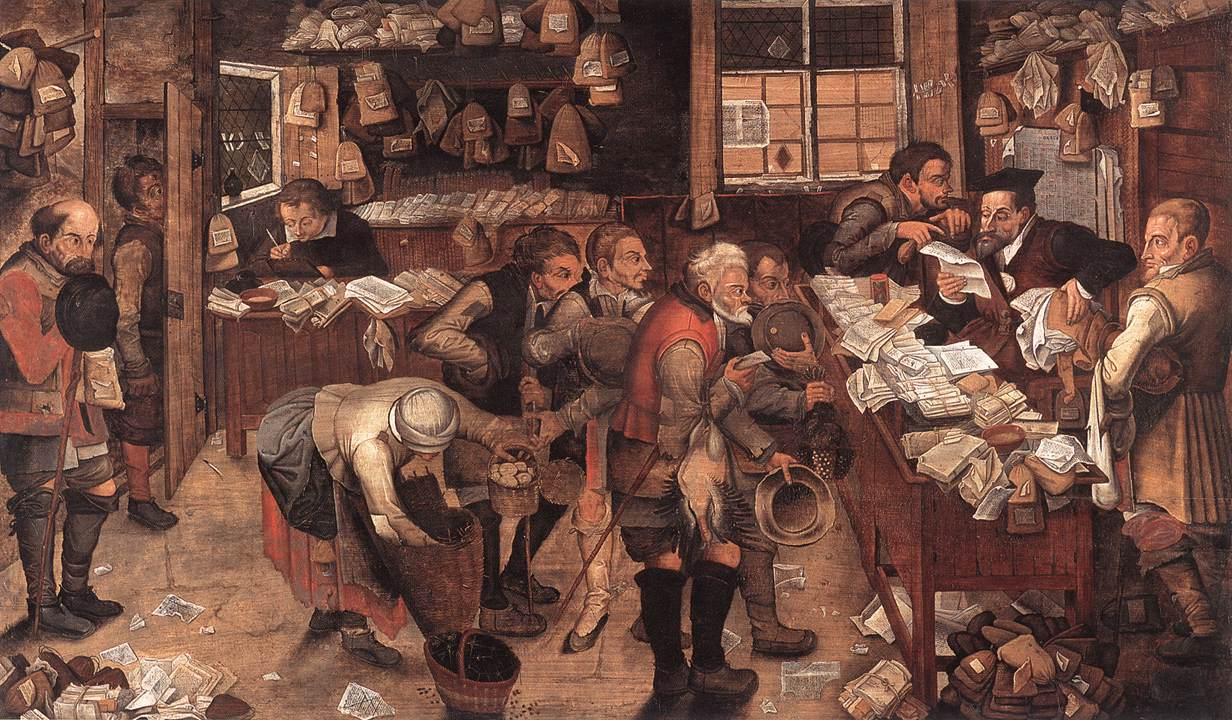
Village Lawyer by Pieter Brueghel the Younger, 1621

After the fall of the western Roman Empire and the onset of the Early Middle Ages, the legal profession of Western Europe collapsed. As James Brundage has explained: "[by 1140], no one in Western Europe could properly be described as a professional lawyer or a professional canonist in anything like the modern sense of the term 'professional.' " However, from 1150 onward, a small but increasing number of men became experts in canon law but only in furtherance of other occupational goals, such as serving the Roman Catholic Church as priests. From 1190 to 1230, however, there was a crucial shift in which some men began to practice canon law as a lifelong profession in itself.

The legal profession's return was marked by the renewed efforts of church and state to regulate it. In 1231 two French councils mandated that lawyers had to swear an oath of admission before practising before the bishop's courts in their regions, and a similar oath was promulgated by the papal legate in London in 1237. During the same decade, Frederick II, the emperor of the Kingdom of Sicily, imposed a similar oath in his civil courts. By 1250 the nucleus of a new legal profession had clearly formed. The new trend towards professionalization culminated in a controversial proposal at the Second Council of Lyon in 1275 that all ecclesiastical courts should require an oath of admission. Although not adopted by the council, it was highly influential in many such courts throughout Europe. The civil courts in England also joined the trend towards professionalization; in 1275 a statute was enacted that prescribed punishment for professional lawyers guilty of deceit, and in 1280 the mayor's court of the city of London promulgated regulations concerning admission procedures, including the administering of an oath.

And in 1345, the French crown promulgated a royal ordinance which set forth 24 rules governing advocates, of which 12 were integrated into the oath to be taken by them.

The French medieval oaths were widely influential and of enduring importance; for example, they directly influenced the structure of the advocates' oath adopted by the Canton of Geneva in 1816. In turn, the 1816 Geneva oath served as the inspiration for the attorney's oath drafted by David Dudley Field as Section 511 of the proposed New York Code of Civil Procedure of 1848, which was the first attempt in the United States at a comprehensive statement of a lawyer's professional duties.

== United States ==
Lawyers became powerful local and colony-wide leaders by 1700 in the American colonies. They grew increasingly powerful in the colonial era as experts in the English common law, which was adopted by all the colonies. By the 21st century, over one million practitioners in the United States held law degrees, and many others served the legal system as justices of the peace, paralegals, marshalls, and other aides.

== Indian subcontinent ==
Around 2000 years ago, there were experts well-versed in matters of law in Sri Lanka. It appears that their primary role was advising the king on achieving justice. These individuals knowledgeable about legal matters were referred to as 'Vohara,' a term derived from the Sanskrit word 'Vyavahara.' This title was given to those who were proficient in the accepted practices of justice and goodness in the contemporary society. Due to the influence of the European colonization, its present legal framework consists of a mixture of legal systems of English common law, Roman-Dutch civil law and Customary Law.

Under the British Raj and since India adopted the British legal system with a major role for courts and lawyers, as typified by the nationalist leaders Muhammad Ali Jinnah and Mahatma Gandhi. Most leading lawyers came from high caste Brahman families that had long traditions of scholarship and service, and they profited from the many lawsuits over land that resulted from these legal changes. Non-Brahman landowners resented the privileged position of this Brahman legal elite.

Gandhi in 1920 proposed an alternative arbitration system but very few legal professionals accepted his call to boycott the established courts. A large effort to establish alternative institutions were known as ‘panchayats’. This panchayat experiment failed due to a combination of apathy, repression, and internal opposition.

== See also ==
- Inns of Court, in England
- Jurist
- List of first female lawyers by country
